= GameLine =

Dial-up system

A diagram of the GameLine service.

GameLine was a dialup game distribution service of Atari 2600 video games developed and operated by Control Video Corporation. Subscribers could install the proprietary modem and storage cartridge in their home game console, accessing the GameLine service to download games over a telephone line. GameLine had an exclusive selection of games, and its pioneering business model eventually gave rise to America Online. Despite being ahead of its time, it was not popular due to its expensive prices and limited-time games.

In 1983, cable pioneer William von Meister was looking for a way to use his modem transmission technology, which was previously acquired in ill-fated attempts of sending music to cable companies. Legal issues caused cable providers to step away from the service, leaving Von Meister with a delivery tool and no content.

He then converted his variable speed adaptive modem technology to download games from central servers to individual households. This allowed users to dial a system and, for a fee, download games to their GameLine modules. The game would typically work for 5–10 plays, after which the user would have to connect to GameLine again and pay for another download.

The "Master Module" has 8 KB of RAM and a 1,200 bps modem, and physically resembles an oversized silver Atari cartridge. It has a phone jack on the side that was used to link the Master Module with the CVC computers. The module is able to transmit with pulse or tone dialing, allowing the unit to be versatile in the field. The games available on the GameLine service were all from third-party gamemakers, the largest of which was Imagic. CVC tried, but failed to obtain licensing agreements from the largest game makers, such as Atari, Activision, Coleco, Mattel, and Parker Brothers.

== Membership benefits ==
When a user registered with the service, they were given a PIN. This PIN was used to log into the central CVC computer and download the requested games. One of the benefits of registering was that users were given free games on their birthday.

GameLine provided players an opportunity to compete in contests with selected games, where they could upload a high score. Prizes would be awarded to regional (and supposedly national) champions. One such regional prize was a GameLine windbreaker.

Each subscriber to GameLine also received a professionally printed magazine titled GameLiner. GameLiner consists of information about new games added to the service, questions and answers, advice on better gameplay, and a list of all currently available games on GameLine.

== Discontinuation ==
GameLine was originally envisioned to provide not just games, but also news (NewsLine), stock quotes (StockLine), sports reporting and scores (SportLine), electronic mail (MailLine), online banking (BankLine), online forums (OpinionLine), and a wide variety of information including airline schedules, horoscopes, and classified ads (InfoLine). GameLine ceased operations before any of these expanded services were offered, though StockLine and SportsLine were reportedly near complete implementation.

Control Video Corporation was one of many smaller companies that went bust in the video game crash of 1983.

== Legacy ==
Even though the GameLine was discontinued, the investors and founding members of CVC went on to start a new company that would continue to use the technological infrastructure they had built. The company, named Quantum Computer Services, was created by Steve Case, among others. This company created a service named Quantum Link which linked together Commodore 64 and Commodore 128 users offering many of the expanded services originally envisioned for GameLine. Quantum Computer Services eventually became America Online in October 1991, which became extremely successful during the 1990s, and eventually took over Time Warner in 2001, but was spun off a few years later. Though the company still technically exists, support for the GameLine does not.

The game titled Save The Whales was exclusive to the GameLine; although it was never released on a cartridge, a prototype was found in early 2002.

== Game list ==
GameLine offered the following games:

- Airlock
- Alien
- Atlantis
- Bank Heist
- Bermuda Triangle
- Boing
- Bugs
- Cakewalk
- China Syndrome
- Coconuts
- Commando Raid
- Cosmic Ark
- Cosmic Creeps
- Cosmic Swarm
- Cross Force
- Crypts of Chaos
- Deadly Duck
- Demolition Herby
- Demon Attack
- Dragonfire
- The Earth Dies Screaming
- Eggomania
- Encounter at L-5
- Entombed
- Fantastic Voyage
- Fast Food
- Fire Fighter
- Flash Gordon
- Frankenstein's Monster
- Gangster Alley
- Gopher
- Guardian
- Infiltrate
- Jawbreaker
- King Kong
- Lost Luggage
- M. A. D.
- Marauder
- M*A*S*H
- Megaforce
- Mines of Minos
- Moonsweeper
- Name This Game
- Nexar
- Nightmare
- No Escape
- Picnic
- Piece O' Cake
- Planet Patrol
- Polaris
- Porky's
- Raft Rider
- Ram It
- Revenge of the Beefsteak Tomatoes
- Riddle of the Sphinx
- Room of Doom
- Save the Whales
- Shark Attack
- Shootin' Gallery
- Sneak & Peek
- Solar Storm
- Space Cavern
- Space Jockey
- Spacemaster X-7
- Squeeze Box
- Sssnake
- Stargunner
- Star Voyager
- Tape Worm
- Threshold
- Towering Inferno
- Trick Shot
- Turmoil
- Warplock
- Word Zapper
- Worm War I

== See also ==
- Intellivision's PlayCable
- Sega Genesis's Sega Channel
- Super Famicom's Satellaview, and Nintendo Power cartridges
- XBAND, a third party online game network and service for the Super NES and Sega Genesis created and run by Catapult
- Family Computer Network System
- Teleplay Modem, a third party modem made for the NES, Super NES, and Sega Genesis
