= Data Age =

Defunct California-based video game company

- Industry: Video games
- Founded: April 1982
- Defunct: May 1983
- Fate: Chapter 11 bankruptcy
- Headquarters: Campbell, California
- Key people: Martin Meeker; Robert Rice
- Products: Journey Escape; Frankenstein's Monster
- Number of employees: 35

Data Age was an American video game company headquartered in Campbell, California that developed and published titles for the Atari 2600. It was founded in April 1982 by president Martin Meeker and vice president Robert Rice, also known as Bob Rice, who had formerly worked in the music industry and been a sales representative at Activision. Data Age was known for its heavy marketing. It released a free record by Craig Hundley to advertise its first batch of five games and spent $4.5 million advertising Journey Escape, a licensed game based on the rock band Journey. Rice put more focus on the marketing than the games themselves, which would later be a source for criticism as their games were often seen as lackluster and outdated.

Journey Escape failed to meet expectations and, just over a year after its founding in May 1983, Data Age filed for Chapter 11 bankruptcy and was quickly liquidated. The company had $7.9 million in outstanding debt. It released a total of eight games, the last three, Journey Escape, Bermuda Triangle and Frankenstein's Monster, were designed by science fiction author J. Ray Dettling. Along with Games by Apollo and U.S. Games, it is seen as one of the earliest casualties of the video game crash of 1983, known at the time as the "big shake-out".

== History ==
Data Age was founded in April 1982, two months before it unveiled its first five games at the Consumer Electronics Show (CES) in June. It was founded in Saratoga, California but by the end of the year its headquarters had moved down the road to Campbell. Its president was Martin Meeker, and its vice president of marketing was Robert Rice. Rice had experience in the music industry and was a former sales manager at Activision. Both indicated in interviews a heavy focus on marketing, with Meeker saying "our games and promotions will reflect and stimulate the interests of American teenagers in a way no other video game company has."

Data Age contracted Craig Hundley, an audio effects artist and composer responsible for the soundtracks of films such as Star Trek: The Motion Picture, The Black Hole, and Megaforce. Hundley produced a record for Data Age titled Mindscape to promote their video games. It was released as a single and distributed as a free promotion starting September 17, 1982. J. Ray Dettling, a physicist and science fiction writer, was also hired by the company. In May, he became their product development manager and went on to design several games for the company. The company started out with four designers and by December had grown to 35 employees.

In October, Data Age released its first five games for the Atari 2600, Airlock, Bugs, Encounter at L-5, Sssnake and Warplock. Before the end of the year, its next release Journey Escape was announced, a licensed rock 'n' roll video game based on the rock band Journey and its recent album Escape. Data Age planned to spend $4.5 million on marketing for the game. It released in January 1983. Journey, which had contributed to the soundtrack of Tron and had a video game playing drummer, was independently looking to produce a video game. Coincidentally, Rice reached out with the same idea and the band quickly agreed to the project. The game was licensed to Bally Midway who planned to develop a version for the arcades; a highly unusual arrangement at the time since this reversed the common trend of arcade games being licensed for home consoles. Journey Escape was reportedly expected to sell three million copies.

On December 8th 1982, A disastrous report on Atari's sales caused stocks related to video games to start falling, beginning the video game crash of 1983. At CES 1983 in January, Rice said "this year, retailers will be more selective in their buying decisions than ever." He also said the company would not "introduce a game without a familiar title." Four games were announced at CES, Bermuda Triangle and Frankenstein's Monster which both released in March, and Mr. Bill's Neighborhood and Smokey the Bear, based on the Mr. Bill sketches on Saturday Night Live and the U.S. Forest Service mascot Smokey Bear respectively, both of which never released. Another unreleased game titled Secret Agent was also teased for the event.

== Fate ==
In early April 1983, Data Age announced sales for Journey Escape were below expectations and announced they were cutting staff. According to Video Games magazine, their initial five game releases also failed to sell well. By May 8th 1983, Data Age had filed for Chapter 11 bankruptcy. Settlements with creditors fell through quickly and the company was liquidated owing to $7.9 million in outstanding debts. Bally Midway announced they were going ahead with the arcade version of Journey Escape, which released as Journey in April 1983. The rest of the company stock of video game cartridges were sold by a company called Kandy Man. Data Age initially had plans to localize their games in Europe but those plans feel through following the bankruptcy.

Following the liquidation, Computer Entertainer rebuffed analysts who claimed the bankruptcy of Data Age, along with Atari's stock market troubles and the failure of fellow video game startups Games by Apollo and U.S. Games were part of a larger collapse of the video game market. The newsletter believed that the bankruptcy was part of an inevitable "shake-out" due to "under-financed companies" and "inferior games". Susan D. Prince writing for Video Games magazine believed the core of Data Age's problems came from an over-reliance on marketing. Bob Rice had once said, "it doesn't matter what kind of game you have as long as you market the hell out of it." Another quote from a print advertisement read, "we wanted to find a way to bring the excitement to customers before they actually bought our games." Prince believed this approach was entirely backwards, and that the company should have focused more on making their games good over creating excessive marketing materials. Electronic Games thought Data Age was destined to fail, claiming their out of date games with "clumsy" graphics got "lost in the shuffle."

== Games ==
Title	Designer	Release Date	Platform	Ref.
Airlock	Unknown	October 1982	Atari 2600	Ref.
Bugs	Unknown	October 1982	Atari 2600	
Encounter at L-5	Unknown	October 1982	Atari 2600	
Sssnake	Unknown	October 1982	Atari 2600	
Warplock	Unknown	October 1982	Atari 2600	
Journey Escape	J. Ray Dettling	January 1983	Atari 2600	
Frankenstein's Monster	J. Ray Dettling	March 1983	Atari 2600	
Bermuda Triangle	J. Ray Dettling	March 1983	Atari 2600	
