= Coconuts (video game) =

1982 video game

- Developer: Telesys
- Publisher: Telesys
- Designers: Jim Rupp (Note: As displayed on the game's packaging.); Jack Woodman
- Platform: Atari 2600
- Release: October 1982
- Genre: Action
- Mode: Single-player

Coconuts is a 1982 action game published by Telesys for the Atari 2600. Players must avoid falling coconuts dropped by a mischievous monkey as a jungle explorer named Stanley I. Presume. The game was created by Telesys vice president Jack Woodman and designed by Jim Rupp. It was one of the first games released by Telesys, along with Fast Food. Telesys marketed the game by sending purple pickles and full sized used tires to their retailers and distributors. Although occasionally praised for its graphics, it was heavily criticized by contemporary reviewers for its lack of substance and difficulty.

== Gameplay ==
In Coconuts, players control Stanley I. Presume, a jungle explorer with a helmet and an umbrella. A monkey named Coco hurls coconuts down towards Stanley while hopping between one of two palm tress. After failing to dodge a coconut, Stanley will lose his umbrella. On a second hit, he loses his helmet before dying after a third hit. The rate of coconuts increases over time and players get points for each coconut dropped.

== Release ==
Coconuts was shipped to retailers alongside Fast Food in late September 1982, they were the first two games released by Telesys. To promote the two games, Telesys sent retailers a "small army" of purple pickles each stuffed with a coconut. They also sent distributors boxes containing a used tire. A note was attached to each delivery that said, "Enclosed is a 3000-pound gorilla's favorite toy which he has just noticed is missing." Then vice president of marketing, Jack Woodman, said "we told them at the CES show in June we were a little bit zany and a lot of fun."

== Reception ==
Sherry Jacobs in Electronic Fun with Computers & Games was highly critical of Coconuts saying "the hardest challenge is staying awake." Although Jacobs thought the graphics were colorful, she complained that the game was too simple, had monotonous sound, and was "not salvageable." Head editor of The Logical Gamer, Alan R. Bechtold, criticized it as "not a game." Bechtold's co-reviewer Mike Wilson liked the graphics but also thought the game lacked substance and was an inferior version of Kaboom! In Video Games magazine, Perry Greenberg heavily criticized it's simplicity, stating "coconuts is what you'd need to be to get off on this game."

JoyStik gave it one out of five stars and said it would "probably hold your interest for only a short period of time." The Video Game Update called the graphics "very colorful" and controls "quite easy", recommending the game only to young kids.
