= Eggomania =

1983 video game

- Developer: James Wickstead Design Associates
- Publishers: NA: U.S. Games; PAL: Carrere Video
- Designers: Henry Will; Wes Trager
- Composer: Todd Marshall
- Platform: Atari 2600
- Release: NA: January 1983; PAL: November 1983
- Genre: Action
- Modes: Single-player, multiplayer

Eggomania is an action video game released in 1983 by U.S. Games for the Atari 2600. Similar in design to Kaboom!, which itself is a derivative of the arcade game Avalanche, the objective is to catch eggs in a hat which are thrown by a chicken. The game was designed by James Wickstead Design Associates and was one of the last games they developed for U.S. Games before the publisher was dissolved in March 1983. Critics were quite fond of the game, though most recognized it to be a Kaboom! derivative. Its sound, graphics, animation, and gameplay were praised highly by numerous reviewers, and it was awarded for being the "funniest game" of 1983.

== Gameplay ==
Six green eggs falling toward the hat

A chicken at the top of the screen moves back and forth, dropping eggs. The paddle controller is used to move a blue bear holding a hat over its head left and right at the bottom of the screen. The goal is to catch the eggs in the hat. At the end of each round, the player has a chance to throw the eggs they have caught back at the chicken for bonus points. The speed of the game increases as the player progresses. The game has two difficulties; the easier variation gives the player a larger hat for catching eggs.

== Development ==
Eggomania was developed at James Wickstead Design Associates, which also developed most of the other games published by U.S. Games. The game's composer and sound designer was Todd Marshall. According to Marshall, one of the game's programmers was Henry Will. According James Hague, author of Halcyon Days, it was also programmed by Wes Trager.

== Release ==
Eggomania was released by U.S. Games in January 1983, two months before U.S. Games would be dissolved by its parent company Quaker Oats. It was part of a new line of games that focused on "family fun", along with Gopher, Squeeze Box, Picnic, and Entombed. The rights to sell the game in Europe were acquired by the French company Carrere Video which started selling it in Germany in November 1983.

== Reception ==
Electronic Games in June 1983 called Eggomania "delightful", stating that the game improved on Kaboom! and Avalanche as a "fully-animated delight that might even eclipse its inspiration" with "state-of-the-art graphics on the 2600". The Video Game Update called it a "totally enchanting game with wildly colorful graphics." In Electronic Fun with Computers & Games, Sherry Jacobs said "in addition to being fun and challenging, the graphics are splendid—bright, exuberant colors with well-defined feathers on the bird." Videogaming and Computer Gaming Illustrated's Jim Clark called it a "good reworking of Kaboom! with superb music. E.C. Meade disagreed with Clark, saying it was "nominally pleasant", full of pointless slop and repetitive music. His opinion was, if a game was very similar to another game, "you've got to do it better or there's no point in having done it at all."

Mike Wilson of The Logical Gamer compared it to a version of Kaboom! requiring less speed and more accuracy. In Computer Games, Raymond Dimetrosky decided it had "the best music and graphics appearing in any game available for the VCS." Computer Games also awarded it the award of "Funniest Game of the Year" for 1983. JoyStik: How to Win at Video Games said "Eggomania's animation and music...are among the funniest in home video." German magazine TeleMatch considered it a favorite and said it had good graphics, sound, animation, and gameplay. Brett Weiss in 2007 said it "isn't as intense as Kaboom! but it is a whimsical good time.

== See also ==
- Chicken
- Lost Luggage
