= Fast food (disambiguation) =

Fast food is mass-produced food that can be prepared and served quickly.

Fast food may also refer to:

- Fast Food (1989 film), an American film
- Fast Food (1998 film), a British film
- Fast Food (1982 video game), a 1982 video game for the Atari 2600
- Fast Food (1989 video game), a 1989 video game in the Dizzy franchise
- Fast Food (album), a 2015 album by Nadine Shah
