= Lost Luggage (video game) =

1982 action game

- Developer: Games by Apollo
- Publisher: Games by Apollo
- Designer: Ed Salvo
- Platform: Atari 2600
- Release: September 1982
- Genre: Action
- Modes: Single-player, multiplayer

Lost Luggage is a 1982 action video game developed and published by Games by Apollo for the Atari 2600. The player controls skycaps working at an airport and tries to collect pieces of luggage that fall overhead from a frantic luggage carousel. A two-player mode, in which the second player controls the direction the luggage falls, is also available.

Programmer Ed Salvo was inspired to make Lost Luggage when he was waiting for his luggage at the Dallas/Fort Worth International Airport, and the game took around four weeks to produce. Reviewers criticized the game's similarity to Activision's Kaboom!—which itself is based on the arcade game Avalanche—believing Lost Luggage to be an inferior clone.

== Gameplay ==
The two skycaps collecting luggage

Lost Luggage is an action game in which the player controls skycap porters who are attempting to collect falling luggage from a wildly unpredictable baggage carousel. The objective is to collect all the suitcases that fall from the carousel before they hit the ground. The player starts with three suitcases, which act as lives, and whenever a suitcase hits the floor, the player loses one. If all of the player's suitcases are lost, the game ends.

There are two difficulty levels, and depending on the difficulty selected, players can control one skycap or two at once. There is also a two-player competitive mode where the second player controls the direction of the flying baggage. Another mode, featuring "terrorist suitcases", is available; enabling this mode will cause black suitcases to appear mixed with the regular baggage. These black suitcases will cause the game to instantly end if they touch the floor, regardless of the player's current number of collected suitcases.

== Development ==
Lost Luggage was developed by Games by Apollo, a video game studio based in Richardson, Texas, which targeted the game at people who traveled regularly, believing that they would like its content. At the time of Lost Luggage's development, the company employed five people. The game was conceived by programmer Ed Salvo. He had been at the Dallas/Fort Worth International Airport after a meeting with Apollo founder Pat Roper and was waiting at the carousel for his luggage to arrive. Later, Salvo discussed the concept of the game with Roper, and they came up with the idea to have the carousel "spewing unmentionables."

Afterwards, Salvo presented artist Ernie Runyon with a rough sketch of his ideas for the game. The crew of Apollo brainstormed titles for half an hour before deciding on Lost Luggage; Runyon later remembered one of the proposed titles was "Airport Mayhem". Runyon programmed the game with help from Salvo. He has stated he would have liked to include a luggage train, but there was not enough room in the 4-kilobyte cartridge. Salvo had difficulties with collision detection and synchronizing the character movements with the joystick, which took one week to fix. Due to a hardware issue, a graphical bug would also occur whenever a suitcase was captured, which was solved by compiling the game on another computer.

The sound effects and music for Lost Luggage were created by Larry Minor. According to Runyon, the game was the first to integrate music on the 2600 as opposed to only sound effects. Salvo estimated that Lost Luggage took a total of four weeks to complete. A four-minute advertising jingle was made by Byron Parks for the game. Apollo founder Pat Roper was "fishing for ad material", and Parks belonged to a sound studio which Roper also owned. The jingle was never used, and in a 2013 interview Runyon recalled that he did not "know or remember where it was intended for use."

Following the release of Lost Luggage, Runyon departed Games by Apollo, making it the only game he worked on at the studio. Salvo eventually left as well. The studio filed for Chapter 11 bankruptcy on November 12, 1982, due to pressure from its advertising agency Benton & Bowles, to which Apollo owed $2.5 million (out of a $5 million total debt). Although Roper expected the company to return in a "smaller form", Apollo closed in 1983 after reorganization attempts failed.

== Release ==
Games by Apollo released Lost Luggage in September 1982. Two versions were released, differentiated by the color of the label. Cartridges with blue labels feature an opening sequence in which the character takes out the three starting suitcases. In the green-labeled version, the game may be restarted by pressing the fire button, which does nothing in the blue-labeled version. Neither Salvo nor Runyon were aware of the existence of this version. Runyon speculated that Salvo may have found more space after tweaking the game and added the features, while Salvo did not "remember doing any of this and I can't conceive of anyone at Apollo messing with the game after it went to production."

== Reception ==
Reception

Review scores
Publication	Score
AllGame	2/5
Atari HQ	4/10

Lost Luggage received mixed reviews upon release. Bill Kunkel and Arnie Katz wrote in a 1982 issue of the magazine Electronic Games that Lost Luggage did not have "the spark of greatness". While they praised the game for shifting away from "the typical SF shoot-out" and said that it was "solid" and "playable", they remarked on its plain-looking graphics and said that "even the greatest concept cannot make a great game when it isn't blended with an outstanding type of play action." Writing for Video, Kunkel and Katz commented on the game's "incredibly cute touches", but suggested that Apollo may have better "scrimp[ed] on the frills" in favor of additional gameplay challenges. Danny Goodman of Creative Computing Video & Arcade Games wrote that "graphics are fun to watch, but the game play for experienced players gets old fast". A reviewer for the magazine TV Gamer recommended the game for children, but felt that seasoned video game players would enjoy Kaboom! more. More positive opinions were from Videogaming Illustrated, which described the game as the most charming of Apollo's releases, and Texas Monthly, which described it as a "fiendish little amusement."

Modern reviews have been largely critical – Brett Alan Weiss, writing for AllGame, considered the game to be a "slower, less intense, less enjoyable" version of Kaboom!. He criticized the lack of support for the paddle controller, and stated that not even the two-player and terrorist modes made the game enjoyable. In his book Classic Home Video Games, Weiss wrote that Lost Luggage was a "fleeting pleasure", opining that "the airplanes flying overhead look nice, but the rest of the game is ordinary in appearance" and that the difficulty curve and action were poor. Writing for Atari HQ, Keita Iida commented that "there are good Kaboom! clones (Eggomania) and then there are bad ones (this one)." Iida believed that if the game was not as similar to Kaboom! then it would be "mildly amusing", but that the better alternatives hampered it.
