= Gopher (video game) =

1982 video game

- Developer: James Wickstead Design Associates
- Publisher: U.S. Games
- Designer: Sylvia Day
- Artist: Robin McDaniel Ballweg
- Composer: Todd Marshell
- Platform: Atari 2600
- Release: NA: January 1983; PAL: November 1983
- Genre: Action
- Modes: Single-player, multiplayer

Gopher is a farming themed action video game released in 1983 for the Atari 2600. It was published by the Quaker Oats funded U.S. Games and developed by James Wickstead Design Associates. The player controls a shovel-wielding farmer who protects a crop of three carrots from a gopher. It is somewhat similar in gameplay to the arcade game Whac-A-Mole. Programming was done by Sylvia Day with graphics by Robin McDaniel Ballweg and music by Todd Marshell.

Some critics heaped high praise on Gopher, with Electronic Games calling it "just about perfect." Other reviewers were less enthused about the repetitive gameplay, the difficulty of the game relative to its target demographic of young children, and the "somewhat morbid" theme. The "cute" and "charming" graphics, music, and sound are frequently seen as a highlight, creating a strong cartoon or storybook like presentation.

== Gameplay ==
Players controls a farmer, who can move left and right, who is attempting to protect his carrot patch from a hungry gopher. The gopher tunnels left and right and up to the surface; it can also wrap around from one side of the screen to the other, something the player cannot do. After breaching a hole to the surface, the gopher will attempt to steal a carrot. The farmer must hit the gopher to send him back underground or fill in the holes afterwords to stop a carrot from getting eaten. The player gets extra points for hitting the gopher directly. If gopher has taken any of the three carrots, a duck will occasionally fly overhead and drop a seed which, if the farmer catches it, he can plant it in the place of the missing carrot. The game ends when the gopher successfully removes all three carrots. Players can choose to play with or without the duck providing extra seeds. There is also an alternating multiplayer mode, giving a total of four game variations.

A gopher has breached the surface and is about to eat one of the farmer's carrots.

== Development & release ==
Gopher was developed for U.S. Games by James Wickstead Design Associates (JWDA). It was programmed by Sylvia Day, graphics were done by Robin McDaniel Ballweg, and music and sound effects were created by Todd Marshell. In mid 1982, U.S. Games first showed the game under the working title Gopher Attack.

Gopher was released by U.S. Games in January 1983, two months before U.S. Games would be dissolved by its parent company Quaker Oats. It was part of a new line of games that focused on "family fun", along with Eggomania, Squeeze Box, Picnic, and Entombed. The rights to sell the game in Europe were acquired by the French company Carrere Video which started selling it in Germany in November 1983. An unlicensed clone was released by Zellers in Canada called Farmer Dan. it uses the box art of Plaque Attack by Activision.

== Reception ==
The Video Game Update recommended Gopher stating it had "genuine charm", "colorful and crisp" graphics, and gameplay that "should appeal to kids of all ages." German magazine TeleMatch thought it was "top-notch" and enjoyed the fast action gameplay and graphics. Jim Clark and E.C. Meade in Videogaming and Computer Gaming Illustrated called it "original and entertaining" and thought the graphics helped create a "storybook" like presentation. Although Clark believed the cartridge would get old quickly and the fast-paced gameplay was "one note." Bill Kunkel and Arnie Katz in Electronic Games said "Gopher is one of those rare games that is both adorable and a ball to play" and highly recommended the game. They also called it "just about perfect."

Electronic Fun with Computers & Games, on the other hand, called it a "graphically pleasing yet rather dull playing game." They did like the music and sound effects which they thought were "charming" and "quite realistic." Mike Wilson of The Logical Gamer believed the game was too hard for its target demographic of young kids. His co-reviewer Alan R. Bechtold disagreed, adding that the graphics were "very good". Video Games magazine's Perry Greenberg said it was "a down-to-earth, monotonous little game with very cute cartoon-like graphics." In JoyStik: How to Win at Video Games, Jim Gorzelany gave Gopher one out of five stars, saying "The graphics are mediocre — the farmer looks good, but the gophers look more like fish than rodents." In 2007, Brett Weiss thought it was pleasant and cute "despite the somewhat morbid theme of hitting small creatures on the head with a shovel."
