= Telesys =

Atari 2600 game developer

- Industry: Video game development and publishing
- Founded: 1982
- Defunct: 1983-4
- Headquarters: Fremont, CA USA
- Key people: Richard Taylor, President
- Products: Atari 2600 games

Telesys was an Atari 2600 game developer and publisher that released six games, all in 1982, before going out of business. Their slogan was "Fun in games". Fast Food was one of their more well-known titles.

The only catalog from Telesys, dated 1983, indicated that the intent was to become a "full-line software company", releasing games, educational, and productivity software for home computers. Telesys folded during the video game crash of 1983 before this happened. Its Atari 2600 games ended up in bargain bins in stores such as Kay Bee Toys.

== Games ==
Telesys released the following games:

- Coconuts
- Cosmic Creeps
- Demolition Herby, a clone of Amidar
- Fast Food
- Ram It
- Stargunner

=== Unreleased ===
- Bouncin' Baby Bunnies (1983)
- The Impossible Game
