= Name This Game =

1983 video game

- Developer: James Wickstead Design Associates
- Publishers: U.S. Games (USA); Carrere Video (Europe)
- Designer: Rob Dubren
- Programmer: Sylvia Day
- Artist: Robin McDaniel Ballweg
- Platform: Atari 2600
- Release: NA: January 1983; EU: November 1983
- Genre: Action
- Mode: Single player

Name This Game and Win $10,000, usually shortened to Name This Game, is a 1983 video game developed by U.S. Games for the Atari 2600.

== Gameplay ==
Name This Game on the Atari 2600

The player controls a scuba diver who must protect a treasure from an octopus at the top of the screen: The octopus tries to capture the treasure with its tentacles. Meanwhile, a great white shark tries to distract the diver by swimming back and forth toward the bottom of the screen.

The diver loses a life if he is captured by the shark or the octopus's tentacles, or if the air meter runs out. The diver can refill his air meter by touching a long pole which extends from a boat that appears from time to time.

== Development ==
The game was conceived by Rob Dubren in February 1982. He offered it to Parker Bros., who owned the video game license for Jaws at the time. After Parker Bros. lost the license, the game was shown to Jim Wickstead of James Wickstead Design Associates (JWDA) in July 1982. From August to October, JWDA programmed the game with "plenty of input" from Dubren. Originally developed as Treasures of the Deep, the game was picked up by U.S. Games as Guardians of Treasure. According to sound designer Todd Marshall, most or all of the programming was done by Sylvia Day and the graphics were done by Robin McDaniel Ballweg.

== Release ==
U.S. Games decided to create a contest around the game, releasing it as Name This Game and Win $10,000 or also just Name this Game, with a cash prize to be awarded to the winning name after April 30, 1983. It was first released in January 1983. U.S. Games was dissolved in March 1983, before the contest could be concluded.

Carrere Video Distribution released the game in Europe in Late November 1983 as Octopus. Amiga also planned to include the game in its Power Play Arcade #2 cartridge but development did not proceed past the prototype stage.

== Reception ==
Jim Clark of Videogaming and Computer Gaming Illustrated said there was nothing "innovative" about the game, but that it was "effectively presented." Clark's co-reviewer E.C. Meade was more negative, claiming the many obstacles in close proximity "tends to create confusion rather than challenge." The Video Game Update recommended the game and thought the game had "good graphical touches" such as the hair of the diver's friend blowing in the breeze. Electronic Games claimed "if ever a videogame deserved a name, this one does." They found it to be "highly playable and satisfying" In Germany, TeleMatch reviewed Octopus calling it a compelling title which stands on its own compared to Shark Attack and Shark! Shark!. Brett Weiss in 2007 called it "enjoyable" and considered the octopus to be an "impressive and imposing visual."

== Legacy ==
In 1994, Digital Press held its own naming contest for the game. The winning title, coined by Russ Perry Jr., was Going Under, which alluded not only to the game content, but to the final days of its publisher.
