= Bellhop =

Hotel porter who helps patrons with their luggage while checking in or out

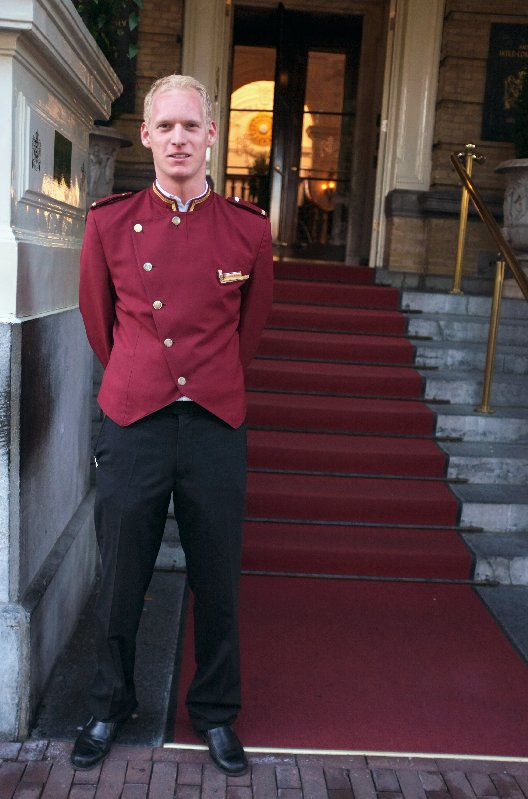
- Bellhop standing in front of a hotel

Occupation
- Names: Porter, bellman, bellboy
- Occupation type: Hospitality, personal care
- Activity sectors: Hotels

Description
- Fields of employment: Service industry

A bellhop (North America), or hotel porter (international), is a hotel employee who helps patrons with their luggage while checking in or out. Bellhops often wear a uniform, like certain other page boys or doormen. This occupation is also known as a bellman and bellboy in North America.

== Duties ==
The name bellhop is derived from a hotel's front-desk clerk ringing a bell to summon a porter, who would hop (jump) to attention at the desk to receive instructions. It is short for bell-hopper, and the word's first known use was in 1897.

The bellhop traditionally is a boy or adolescent male, hence the term bellboy. Bellhops interact with a variety of people each day, and duties often include opening the front door, moving luggage, valeting cars, calling cabs, transporting guests, advising directions, performing basic concierge work, and responding to guests' needs. While carrying luggage, they escort guests to their rooms.

In some countries, it is customary to tip a bellhop for their service.

== Uniform ==
The typical bellhop uniform comprises a distinctive hat and jacket. Versions of these items are sometimes worn as fashion.

A bell-boy hat or cap is a small round or oval brimless cap with a crown about 2–3 inches in height, resembling a squat can or drum. The bell-boy hat is based on a 19th-century military drummer boy's cap. A bell-boy hat usually features a chinstrap, and is trimmed to match the rest of a bellhop's uniform. As a fashion item, the style was popular in the late 1930s and 1940s for women, when it could be dressed up with veils, military trimmings or a snood (a decorative hairnet). The chinstrap would then be worn to the back – under the skull – to help secure it to the head. A bellhop's hat is also frequently seen in the logo of the Belgian comic character Spirou, as the character is depicted as being a bellboy.

The typical bellhop jacket is modeled on uniforms traditionally worn by 19th-century military dress uniforms, especially those worn by drummer boys. It consists of a very fitted waist-length jacket with a band collar, often double-breasted and trimmed with fancy braid or piping, and rows of close-set brass buttons. The cuffs of the jacket often have similar decoration.

== See also ==
- Porter (carrier)
- Skycap
- List of hat styles
- Pillbox hat
