= Baggage carousel =

Device delivering checked luggage in airports

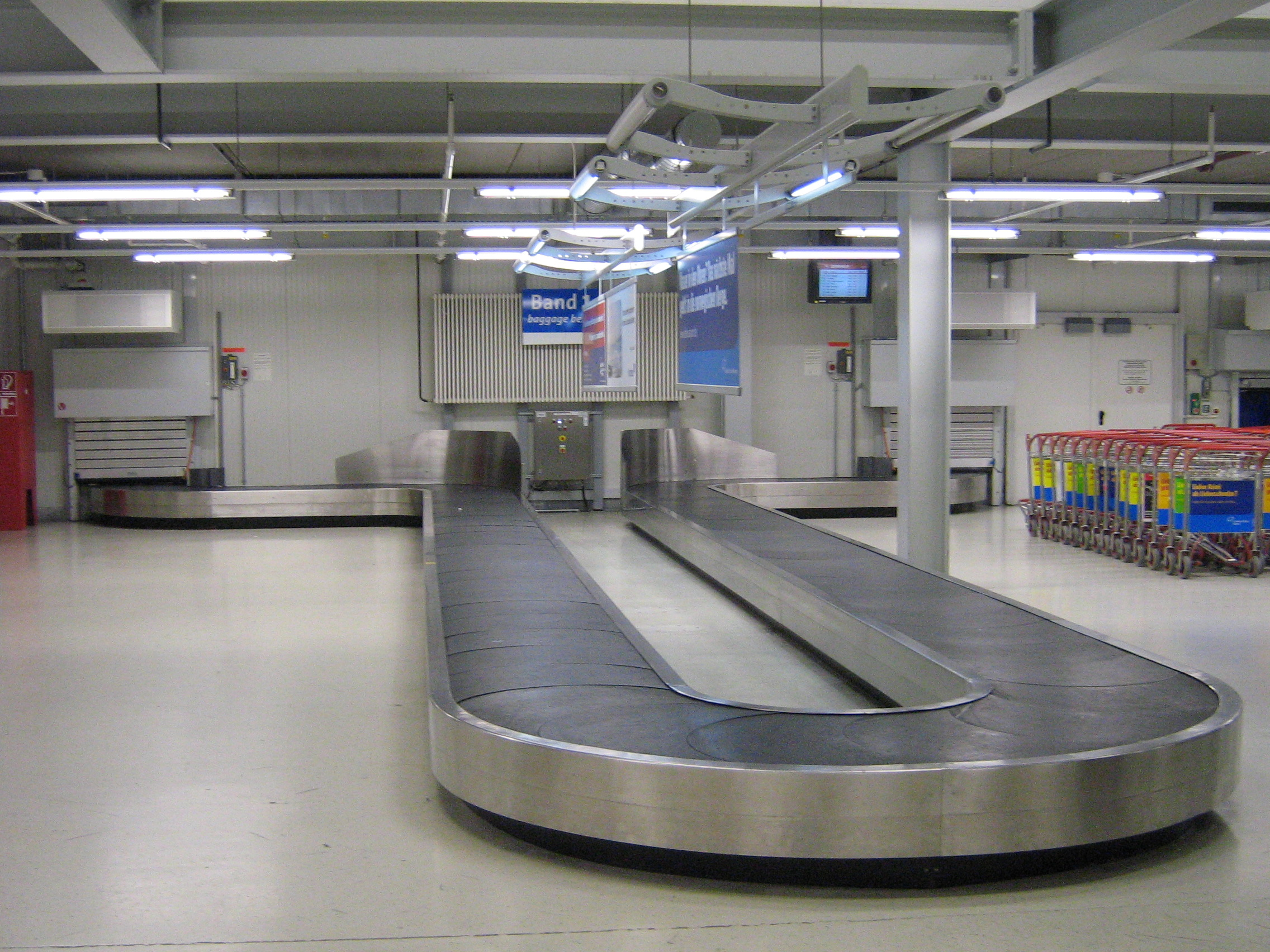
- A single level baggage carousel at Frankfurt-Hahn Airport. The baggage comes out through one of the holes in the walls and goes back in to circulate around the circle again.
- Industry: Airports
- Application: Delivers checked luggage to the passengers at the baggage reclaim area at their final destination

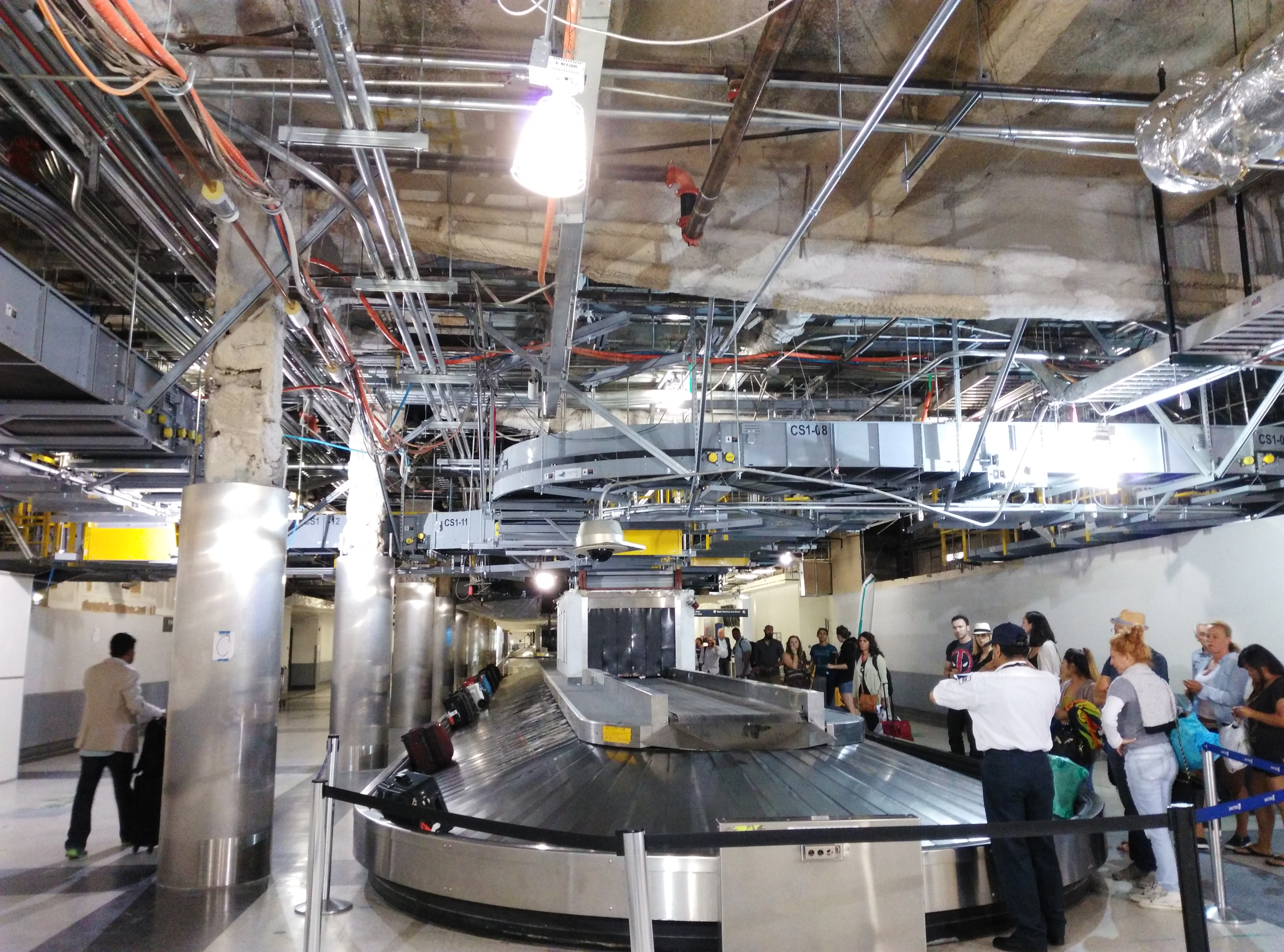
Baggage carousel equipment at LAX exposed during renovation

A baggage carousel is a device, generally at an airport, that delivers checked luggage to the passengers at the baggage reclaim area at their final destination. Airports without carousels generally deliver baggage by placing it on the floor or sliding it through an opening in a wall.

== Operation ==
Computer-controlled baggage carousel at Heathrow Airport's Terminal 2. A second delivery chute is visible, top-right.

Bags are placed on some type of conveyor belt in a secure area not accessible by passengers.

In a single-level system, the belt will deliver bags into the terminal from an opening in the wall. The belt generally runs along the wall for a short distance and then turns into the terminal forming a long oval that allows many passengers to access the belt. The belt continues back to the loading area through a second opening in the wall.

In a multilevel system, the bags are generally loaded from above or below the carousel and then delivered onto a moving oval-shaped carousel. It is common for this type of system to have two delivery belts, increasing the speed with which bags can be delivered to the passenger level.

There is also a variety of carousel that is a combination of the two systems. These occur mainly in Europe. Bags are loaded from an upper level and end up on the rotating carousel, as is normal. However, the very back portion of the oval, in this case, runs in and out of the wall, so it can be accessed by baggage handlers.

== Exceptions ==
Commonly, the following types of checked baggage are not placed on a baggage carousel:

- Golf clubs in golf bags
- Surfboards
- Wheelchairs
- Bicycles
- Baby strollers
- Child car seats
- Skis

These items are delivered in many ways including:

- Placing them on the floor
- Delivered through a special opening
- Picked up at the customer service office
- Placed in special racks (common in ski area destinations)

== See also ==
- Ground support equipment
- Lost Luggage (video game)
