= Kaboom! (video game) =

1981 action game

- Atari 2600 cover art
- Developer: Activision
- Publisher: Activision
- Designer: Larry Kaplan
- Platforms: Atari 2600, Atari 5200, Atari 8-bit
- Release: Atari 2600: July 1981; Atari 8-bit: October 1983; Atari 5200: November 1983
- Genre: Action
- Modes: Single-player, multiplayer

Kaboom! is a 1981 action video game developed and published by Activision for the Atari 2600. (Note: The system became known as the Atari 2600 only after the release of the Atari 5200 in 1982.) The game involves a Mad Bomber dropping bombs at increasing speeds as the player controls a set of water buckets to catch them. The gameplay was based on the Atari arcade video game Avalanche (1978). Kaboom! was programmed by Larry Kaplan with David Crane coding the graphics for the buckets and Mad Bomber. It was the last game designed by Kaplan for Activision, who left the company shortly after it was released. The game was later ported by Paul Wilson for the Atari 5200 system.

Critical reception of the game commended its graphics, particularly those of the Mad Bomber, whose expression changed based on the player's performance. Reception was mixed towards the game's simplicity, with some critics praising it as a change of pace from games like Asteroids (1979) or Space Invaders (1978), while others found it lacking in variety and complexity. Retrospective reviews were more positive with it being praised for its simple and addictive action qualities and being among the best games released by Activision during its early era.

The game sold over one million cartridges and was one of the best-selling Atari 2600 games. Following its release, cartridges with gameplay similar to Kaboom! were released for the Atari 2600 such as Lost Luggage (1982) and Eggomania (1983). A follow-up to Kaboom!, titled Kaboom!: The Return of the Mad Bomber, was shown at the 1991 Summer Consumer Electronics Show for the Super Nintendo Entertainment System, but never released.

== Gameplay ==
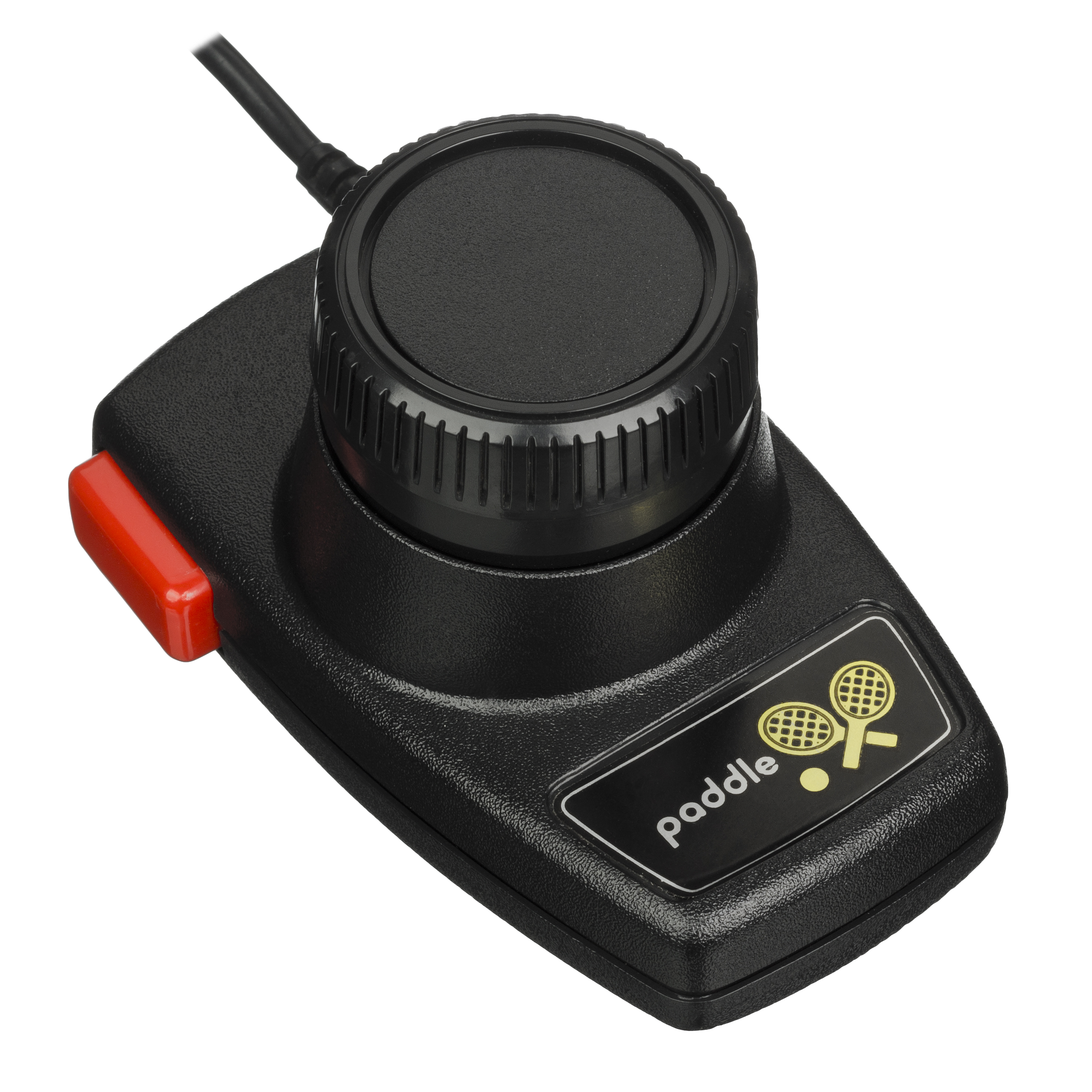
Kaboom! uses the VCS paddle controller, which had fallen out of regular use at time of the game's release.

In Kaboom!, a "Mad Bomber" drops bombs to watch them explode. The player starts with three water-filled buckets and must catch the bombs to defuse them and gain points.

The game uses the paddle controller, moving the buckets of water left and right by moving the dial clockwise and counter-clockwise. The bombs begin dropping faster as they are collected. When the player misses a bomb, all other bombs on the screen explode and the player loses one bucket. The player can regain a lost bucket by collecting 1,000 points.

Difficulty switches on the console can be adjusted to make buckets that are half as wide than normal, making grabbing bombs more difficult. A two-player option is available where the players take turns controlling buckets and have their own individual scores displayed.

== Development ==
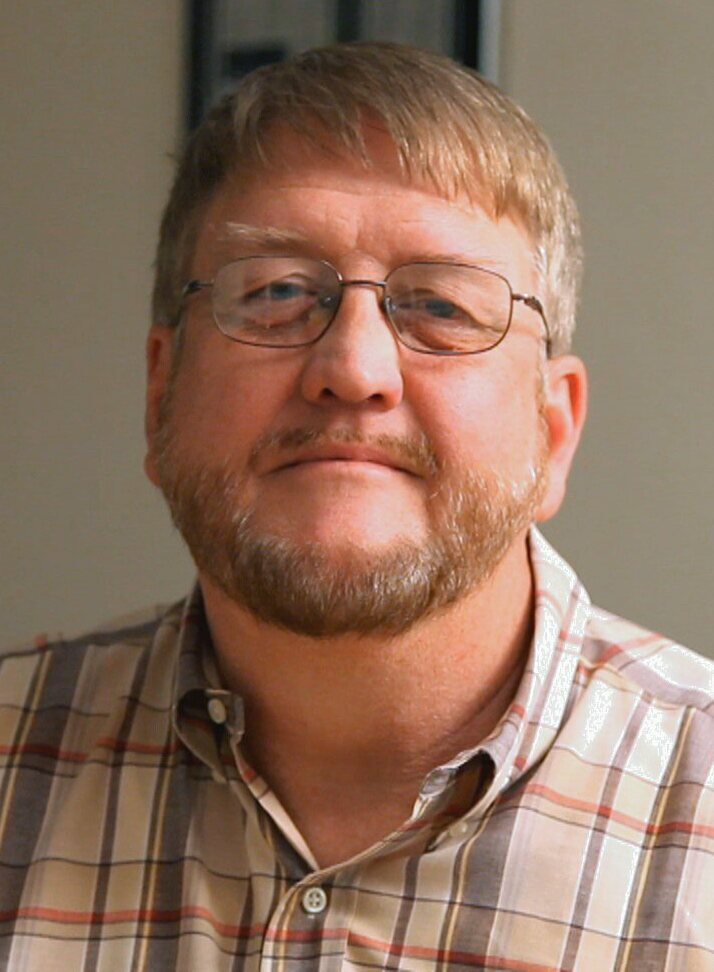
David Crane (pictured in 2013) created code for the design of the Mad Bomber.

Larry Kaplan designed Kaboom! for Activision. Kaplan, Alan Miller and David Crane had all previously worked at Atari, Inc. They believed Atari undervalued its programmers, leading Crane and Miller to leave Atari in August 1979 to create Activision. Kaplan followed soon after. Prior to Kaboom!'s release, Kaplan developed Bridge for the Atari 2600, a game based on contract bridge, which was released in December 1980.

Kaboom! was inspired by the 1978 Atari arcade game Avalanche designed by Dennis Koble. Kaplan was open about the influence in later interviews, saying "I just ripped off Avalanche." Kaplan said he was limited with the games graphics, and since he could not reuse the falling rocks from the arcade game, he changed it to being a single figure dropping bombs. Kaplan credited Crane for designing the mad bomber and buckets. Crane said that in 1979, he was working on creating a realistic animation of a man running. The character would eventually be used for Pitfall! (1982), but Crane originally tried to use the character in a "Cops and Robbers"-themed game which was never published. The character in this game had a black and white colored horizontal stripe shirt, which was later used in Kaboom! for the Mad Bomber. Crane said that at the time, Kaplan's game had Pong-like paddles and did not reflect the high quality graphics in Activision's games. Crane said he developed the graphics for the Mad Bomber, bombs, and the water buckets as well as adding coding that changed the facial expression of the Mad Bomber based on the gameplay.

Paul Wilson ported Kaboom! to both the Atari 5200 and Atari 8-bit computers. Wilson's version for both systems featured a "Pitch and Catch" mode, which allowed two players to take turns controlling the buckets and the Mad Bomber.

== Release ==
Along with Freeway, Kaboom! was shipped in July 1981. Wilson's port of Kaboom! was released for Atari 8-bit computers in October 1983 and the Atari 5200 in November 1983.

The Atari 2600 version of Kaboom! is featured in several compilations, including Atari 2600 Action Pack (1995) for Windows and Macintosh-based computers, Activision Classics (1998) for the PlayStation, Activision Anthology for the PlayStation 2 (2002), the Game Boy Advance in 2003 and iPad, iPhone and Android devices in 2012. Along with other Activision published titles, Kaboom! was included as a hidden feature in Call of Duty: World War 2 (2017).

Kaboom! was made available to play in the Retro Classics catalogue for Xbox Game Pass subscribers in 2025. Atari teased a large announcement on August 20, 2026 which was revealed a re-release of several Activision games for the Atari 2600. This included Kaboom!, which was set for a mid-2027 release.

== Reception ==
Kaboom! on the Atari 2600. Contemporary reception noted details such as the bomber's reactions and the flickering of bombs.

Kaboom! was one of the best-selling games for the Atari 2600. Activision had sold $6.3 million in 1981 and $66 million in 1982. James Levy of Activision stated Kaboom! had sold over one-million copies by 1984. Perry Greenberg of Video Games reflected on the success of Kaboom! in 1982, writing that it was "not much of a game" and "was a hit solely because of the dearth of TV-game competition when it came out. Back then [...] you didn't expect much and you got even less."

Bill Kunkel and Frank Laney Jr. in Electronic Games complimented the unique gameplay, writing that once you are tired of blasting asteroids or invading aliens, Kaboom! felt "refreshing". Richard A. Edwards also noted the unique gameplay in The Space Gamer, saying that it felt different than shooting games, but found it lacked variety and was a game of "reflexes, not thought", recommending players to try it before purchasing. Other reviewers complimented the graphics, with a review from TV Gamer calling it "graphically exciting", noting small touches like the flames exploding at the top of the bombs. Kunkel and Laney Jr. addressed the similarities to the game Avalanche, but found Kaboom! "infinitely more enjoyable" due to superior graphics. Other publications praised the game's addictive gameplay, such as JoyStik How to Win at Video Games, Creative Computing and Computer & Video Games; the latter declared it "an extremely compulsive reaction game". In the 1982 Arcade Awards, the game was awarded Best Audio-Visual Effects. The write-up of the game stated that Activision games were known for "beautiful simplicity of its graphics" and had "hit the mark dead-center again with Kaboom!.

In his book Video Games (1982), Daniel Cohen said Kaboom! was among the best video games, specifically praising the engaging character of the Mad Bomber. Cohen compared the character to Pac-Man, noting the personality of the character changing, such as his smile when the player misses a bomb and his frown when the player reached high scores. Rick Vogt in The Miami Herald also enjoyed the Mad Bomber's reactions, while ultimately finding that the game would only predominantly appeal to children who were "easily frustrated with the space games saturating the market."

Reviewing the port for the Atari 8-bit computers, Computer Entertainer found it superior to the Atari 2600 adaptation, noting better graphics and the added "Pitch and Catch" variation. Other reviewers commented on the gameplay, such as David Duberman of Antic who found the game cute and the acknowledged the gameplay as simple "but not by any means easy". Softline dismissed the gameplay, stating that there was "no real game here, just a test of paddle controls." The reviewer suggested that Atari computer games had "passed the stage of evolution of Kaboom! is in-they want more sophistication." Creative Computing said that the Atari 8-bit version was just as fun as, and improved on, the 2600 version.

=== Retrospective reviews ===
William Cassidy of GameSpy commented on Kaboom! in 2003, stating that it involved twitch gameplay, a style which was popular in arcades and consoles around the time of the games release. The style involved acquiring quick reflexes and began to recede in popularity when more complicated games were released that involved more intricate puzzle solving. Cassidy said Kaboom! was "one of the most addictive and entrancing twitch games ever made" which "manages to walk the line, perfectly balanced between challenge and cheapness". Scott Alan Marriott of AllGame praised the game's simplicity and addictiveness while Flux magazine included the Atari 2600 version at 85th on their Top 100 Video Games list in 1995. Mat Allen of Retro Gamer referred to Kaboom!, along with River Raid (1982), Pitfall II: Lost Caverns (1984), Ghostbusters (1984), Little Computer People (1985) and Alter Ego (1986) as one of the best games from Activision's classic period.

== Legacy ==
Following Kaboom!'s release, other companies developed similar games, such as Lost Luggage (1982) by Apollo and Eggomania (1983) by U.S. Games. TV Gamer described these games as "Catch 'N Score" where players must catch falling or moving objects coming towards you to score points. In 1983, Jim Clark reviewed Crackpots (1983) in Videogaming and Computer Gaming Illustrated, lamenting that Activison has reached a point of saturation with the Kaboom!-themed games of catching or tossing objects with games like Spider Fighter (1982) and Oink! (1983). Three follow-ups to older Activison properties were shown at the Summer Consumer Electronics Show in 1991 for the Super Nintendo Entertainment System, including Kaboom!: The Return of the Mad Bomber that never released.

Kaplan left Activision shortly after completing Kaboom!. He wanted to work on hardware and that he was not enjoying his time at the company. Kaplan said that he felt Jim Levy of Activision was "pushing the superstar approach, the media loves it [...] it's taking things out of context and it's lying." Kaplan briefly attempted to start his own hardware and software company funded by Jay Miner which fell through leading Kaplan to return to work at Atari. He would later work for companies such as Amiga and Silicon Graphics.

== See also ==
- List of Atari 2600 games
- List of Activision games: 1980–1999
