= Journey Escape =

1983 video game

- Developer: Data Age
- Publisher: Data Age
- Designer: J. Ray Dettling
- Platform: Atari 2600
- Release: NA: January 1983
- Genre: Action
- Mode: Single-player

Journey Escape on the Atari 2600

Journey Escape is an action video game developed and published by Data Age for the Atari 2600, and released in January 1983. It stars the rock band Journey, a band that had recently sold six million copies of its newest album Escape, their number one album of all time containing the single "Don't Stop Believin'". In the game, players control band members as they escape groupies, photographers, and promoters on their way to their next concert.

Journey Escape was a mutual endeavor by Data Age and Journey, who had both come up with the idea of a video game based around the band independently. It was designed by J. Ray Dettling, a former science fiction writer and physicist who worked closely with Journey creative director Jim Welch. Data Age spent $4.5 million in television advertisement for the game, in addition to promotion by Journey via a live tour in 1983. The game was licensed to Bally Midway who produced a Journey arcade game titled Journey. It is widely considered the first home console video game to be licensed for the arcades. In the end, it failed to reach the three million in expected sales. Four months after release, Data Age was forced to cut staff and finally declare bankruptcy.

== Plot ==
From the game's manual:

You're on the road with Journey, one of the world's hottest rock groups. A spectacular performance has just ended. Now it's up to you to guide each Journey Band Member past hordes of Love-Crazed Groupies, Sneaky Photographers, and Shifty-Eyed Promoters to the safety of the Journey Escape Vehicle in time to make the next concert. Your mighty manager and loyal roadies are there to help, but the escape is up to you!

== Gameplay ==
The player must lead the band members to their "Scarab Escape Vehicle" (as featured on the cover) and protect the concert cash from "love-crazed" groupies, sneaky photographers, stage barriers and "shifty-eyed" promoters. Assisting the player are roadies, which provide short periods of immunity to obstacles, and The Manager, which allows the player to move to the Scarab completely unhindered. The screen scrolls vertically non-stop, although the speed can be controlled; the player moves side to side to dodge the aforementioned obstacles.

== Development ==
Journey Escape is based on the San Francisco-based rock band Journey, which had recently released their seventh studio album titled Escape. Escape sold over six million copies by the end of 1982. It ended up being their best selling album of all time and contained their hit single "Don't Stop Believin'". Journey already had strong ties to video games, they had provided songs for the Tron soundtrack and drummer Steve Smith was a previous high score champion in Defender. According to bassist Ros Valory, he and Smith had first encountered Defender in an arcade in Japan. Smith went on to buy his own Defender and Stargate arcade machines, which went on tour with the band and were placed backstage. According to the band's manager Herbie Herbert, Journey was already in talks to produce its own video game when management was approached by Robert Rice, the vice president of marketing at Data Age, with the same idea. A licensing arrangement was made within the span of an hour.

The game was designed by Data Age product development manager J. Ray Dettling. Dettling was a science fiction author and physicist that had previously done work for the Space Shuttle program. According to Dettling, he first meet Bob Rice in a coffee shop in Saratoga, California. After Rice mentioned his 15 years experience working in the record business, Dettling mentioned he played guitar for a local band. He was asked to come down and look at the five games Data Age was working on and write science fiction concepts for them. Dettling says he developed game storyboards and didn't do the programming, though he did also design graphics and sound effects for the game.

According to Dettling, members of Journey had an active hand in designing the game. The sent over a initial concept that was similar to Donkey Kong. Dettling says he talked with Journey creative director Jim Welch, "almost daily" to develop game ideas. Many ideas were restrained by the limitations of the hardware. Dettling said "we tried to get as much of the Journey property...as we could into the game," adding that they spent "hours and hours trying to find a few extra bytes of memory" to fit in additional ending scene. This was in addition to an already memory intensive opening scene. Dettling believes the gameplay suffered in an effort to fit in as many elements as possible.

== Release ==
Data Age was infamous for its heavy focus on marketing. To promote their first five releases in October 1982, they had commissioned film composer Craig Hundley to produce a free three and half minute record. For Journey Escape, its next release which launched the company planned to spend $4.5 million in television promotion. This was in addition to Journey themselves which went on a national tour to 50 U.S. cities in March of that year. The game was shipped to retailers in the first week of January 1983. Data Age expected to sell three million copies.

At Winter CES 1983, Data Age announced they had signed a licensing deal with coin-op manufacturer Bally Midway, giving them exclusive rights to develop an arcade game based on Journey Escape. This was considered notable at the time because most licensing agreements went in the other direction. Arcade manufacturers typically licensed their arcade games for home consoles, not the other way around. It was widely considered to be the first home console game to be licensed as an arcade game.

Journey Escape sold far less than anticipated, which initially resulted in layoffs at the company. By May, Data Age had declared Chapter 11 bankruptcy and in short order its assets were liquidated. The rights to the Journey video game license reverted back to the band itself, who continued to license it out to Bally Midway. Midway released their arcade version titled Journey, which ended up very different to the console game, in April 1983. The remain cartridge inventory was sold by a small firm named Kandy Man.

== Reception ==
- Electronic Fun with Computers & Games
- Videogaming Illustrated
- Vidiot
- Blip
- Video Games
- JoyStik: How to Win at Video Games
- The Milwaukee Sentinel
- The Logical Gamer
- The Video Game Update
- Electronic Gaming Monthly
- Game Informer
- Classic Home Video Games, 1972-1984: A Complete Reference Guide

== See also ==
- Revolution X, 1994 video game featuring rock band Aerosmith
