= Towering Inferno (video game) =

1982 video game

- Developer(s): US Games
- Publisher(s): US Games
- Designer(s): Jeff Corsiglia
- Programmer(s): Paul Allen Newell
- Platform(s): Atari 2600
- Release: NA: October 1982
- Genre(s): Action

Towering Inferno is a 1982 action video game developed and published by US Games for the Atari 2600. The game is based on the 1974 film of the same name, and was produced under a license obtained from 20th Century-Fox by Quaker Oats (the parent company of US Games) for the video game rights to the film. The player controls a fireman going through a burning skyscraper to save victims and put out the fires.

The game was designed by Jeff Corsiglia and programmed by Paul Allen Newell, who also programmed the Vectrex port of Scramble and co-designed and programmed the maze algorithm serving as the basis for the 2600 game Entombed.

== Gameplay ==
Gameplay screenshot

On each floor of the building, the player must put out the flames and reach the panel that opens the doors to get back out. While doing so, there is a meter at the top showing how many people are on that floor. The longer it takes a player to open the doors and get out, the more the meter decreases. Points are scored for putting out flames and rescuing people. The game can be played by one or two players.

== Reception ==
Towering Inferno was reviewed in Video magazine in its "Arcade Alley" column where it was described as "an above-average, enjoyable cartridge [that] is a refreshing change from shoot-shoot-shoot". Reviewers emphasized the non-violent nature of the game, noting that it "achieves a respectable level of excitement without having a shot fired in anger", however they also cautioned readers that the game "may be a little too patterned and repetitive for some". Videogaming Illustrated described the game as "fast-paced entertainment" and listed it as "highly recommended".

Later reviewers were less forgiving of the graphics but praised the gameplay. In Classic Home Video Games, 1972-1984: A Complete Reference Guide, Brett Weiss describes the graphics as "cheap looking" but describes the gameplay as "original and even compelling".

Paul Allen Newell, when asked in the 21st century what he would change if he could "redo" any of his games, said he could not think of anything he would want to change in Towering Inferno, though he would want to rework other games. (Note: such as to "do [Scramble] right" by making an 8 KB version instead of the 4 KB released version, and to completely rewrite Cube Quest, which was released in an unfinished and underdeveloped form)

== Reviews ==
- Games

== See also ==
- Fire Fighter, another Atari 2600 fire fighting game from 1982
