= Journey (1983 video game) =

1983 video game

- Arcade flyer
- Developer: Bally Midway
- Publisher: Bally Midway
- Designer: Marvin Glass and Associates
- Programmers: Richard Ditton; Elaine Ditton
- Artist: Scott Morrison
- Composers: Elaine Ditton; Steve Meyer
- Platform: Arcade
- Release: NA: March 1983
- Genre: Action
- Mode: Single-player
- Arcade system: Bally Midway MCR III

Journey is an arcade video game released by Bally Midway in 1983. Rock band Journey had enjoyed major success in the early 1980s, and Bally/Midway decided to ride this wave of popularity by creating an arcade game based on the group. Its release was intended to coincide with a US tour by the band.

This game uses digitized photographs of the members of the band at the time: Steve Perry, Neal Schon, Steve Smith, Jonathan Cain, and Ross Valory.

== Gameplay ==
Controls consist of an eight-position joystick and a button. The objective is to collect the band's instruments, which have been stolen by crazed alien fans and scattered across five different planets.

Each level consists of five minigames followed by a bonus round. The player chooses a minigame by moving the band's Scarab Vehicle onto the corresponding planet on the screen. Each minigame requires the player to maneuver one band member (depicted as a black-and-white photograph of his face on a cartoon body) through assorted obstacles and pick up his instrument, then return to the vehicle.

Electronically synthesized instrumental excerpts of Journey songs play during the minigames, and "Lights" plays during the selection screen.

- Steve Perry: Navigate through a maze of swinging gates to reach Perry's microphone, then shoot and destroy the gates as they descend. Music: "Don't Stop Believin'."
- Neal Schon: Navigate a cavern using a jetpack to reach Schon's guitar, then return to the exit while dodging or destroying rockets launched from silos scattered throughout the screen. Music: "Chain Reaction."
- Steve Smith: Jump from one floating drum to another; the first jump on a drum turns it from red to blue, while the second jump makes it disappear. Once all drums have turned blue, the player can collect Smith's drum kit and use it to blast through a swarm of enemies. Music: "Wheel in the Sky."
- Jonathan Cain: Descend a series of ramps while jumping over moving hurdles to reach Cain's keyboard, then shoot lines of enemies that close in from opposite sides of the screen. Music: "Stone in Love."
- Ross Valory: Jump from one telescoping platform to another to reach Valory's bass, then destroy the platforms and dodge the projectiles they fire. Music: "Keep On Runnin'."

Completing all five minigames takes the player to a bonus round in which the band performs a concert for a crowd of alien fans. The player must maneuver the band's manager Herbie Herbert (Note: Unlike the members of Journey, Herbert's sprite does not feature a digitized photograph of his head, and he is instead depicted entirely as a cartoon character.) to stop fans from reaching the stage by blocking the stage doors and bouncing them off his stomach. If any of them do so, the crowd storms the stage and steals the instruments as the band flees, and the game begins again with increased difficulty. The music for this round is a looped excerpt of "Separate Ways (Worlds Apart)," played from an internal cassette deck.

A collision with any obstacle or projectile costs one life and returns the player to the selection screen. When all lives are lost, the game ends.

== Development ==
Although they have cartoon bodies, the faces of the members are shown as black-and-white photographs taken of the band while on tour. The photo technology was invented by Ralph H. Baer and was originally to be used in another game, which would allow high scoring players to take photos of themselves for display on the high score list and as the head of the player character. However, the game in question failed location testing when one player engaged in exhibitionism.

== Reception ==
In its June 2007 issue, Game Informer magazine named the game number 9 on its "Top 10 Worst Licensed Game Ideas (ever)".

== See also ==
- Journey Escape, another video game featuring Journey
