= Revenge of the Beefsteak Tomatoes =

1983 video game

- Cover art
- Publisher: Fox Video Games
- Programmer: John Russell
- Platform: Atari 2600
- Release: NA: 1983
- Genre: Action
- Mode: Single player

Revenge of the Beefsteak Tomatoes is a video game for the Atari 2600 written by John Russell, and published by Fox Video Games, Inc. in 1983. Upon its release in 1983, the game cost roughly $30.

The back of the box reads "Perhaps it was a form of protest against bottled Ketchup, or maybe they were provoked by acid rain." However they came into awareness, tomatoes have become killers that cannot be destroyed by mankind's weapons. The tomatoes can only be trapped by building a brick wall.

It is believed that title and the concept of this game are inspired by the cult movie Attack of the Killer Tomatoes.

== Gameplay ==
Revenge of the Beefsteak Tomatoes player building walls

The tomatoes fire missiles at the player who controls the "tomato sprayer", which moves around the screen. By dodging the missiles, the player aims to shoot down bricks that move along the top of the screen. After successfully hitting the bricks, the player is able to build walls, which upon sealing will destroy the tomatoes and the tomato plants. Upon building the third wall, the level is completed and the player receives bonus points.

Points are awarded for destroying tomatoes and building walls and range from 5 to 3000. There are eight levels of increasing difficulty, where several types of tomatoes are introduced incrementally as well as growing in size. There are also four separate types of user selected difficulty options that include changing the speed of the tomatoes and the number of sprayers available.

== Marketing ==
During Super Bowl XVII in Pasadena, California, Fox staged a publicity stunt for the game. Two people dressed as giant tomatoes were seated near the endzone, and spent the game picketing with signs that read "Beefsteak Tomatoes Demand Revenge". Fox's vice-president of marketing said of the stunt "the idea was to pique the public's interest and establish a kind of mascot for the game." The tomato "models" received a positive response from the surrounding crowd although one, named Jane Forelle, mentioned that some fans had tried to squeeze her, of which she disapproved.

== Reception ==
The name Revenge of the Beefsteak Tomatoes has been called whimsical, and one of the "best new game names" at the 1983 Winter Consumer Electronics Show.

Schwartz and Dykman of Allgame said that you had "better think twice before eating another tomato".

== Sources ==
- Chin, Kathy (February 28, 1983). "Video-game vegetables appear at Superbowl, not in salad bowl". InfoWorld. 5 (9). InfoWorld Media Group, Inc. ISSN 0199-6649.
- Dvorak, John C. (February 7, 1983). "Meditating on the fruit tree table". InfoWorld. 5 (6). InfoWorld Media Group, Inc. ISSN 0199-6649.
- Mace, Scott (January 31, 1983). "Computer software & games video & audio". InfoWorld. 5 (5). InfoWorld Media Group, Inc. ISSN 0199-6649.
- Weiss, Brett (2007). Classic home video games, 1972-1984: a complete reference guide. McFarland. ISBN 978-0-7864-3226-4.
