= Stargunner (1983 video game) =

1983 video game

- Developer: Telesys
- Publisher: Telesys
- Designer: Alex Leavens
- Platform: Atari 2600
- Release: January 1983
- Genre: Scrolling shooter
- Mode: Single-player

Stargunner is a horizontally scrolling shooter for the Atari 2600 written by Alex Leavens and published by Telesys in 1983. The player takes the role of a spaceship pilot who must defend their planet from outlaws. The game is frequently compared to Defender, a similar scrolling shooter.

== Gameplay ==
Stargunner on Atari 2600

In the game, players take control of the last starfighter from the fictional planet Yarthae. Players must defend the planet from the Sphyzygies, a band of space outlaws and their bio-droids, Bobo. During a round of gameplay, Bobo hovers at the top of the screen dropping bombs periodically. After four squares finish converging on a random point on screen, A Sphyzygie will appear in that location. The player can travel freely around the screen and earn points by shooting down appearing Sphyzygies. The Sphyzygie cannot shoot but if the player runs into one or is on top of one as it is appearing, they will lose a life. The player will also lose a life if they are hit by one of Bobo's bombs.

Each level consists of three waves, with more Sphyzygie appearing at once with each wave. The start of each wave resets the amount of enemies appearing back to one, but enemy Sphyzygie now move faster.

== Development ==
Stargunner was designed by Alex Leavens, who was a previous employee of Atari Inc. and Midway Games and had developed the Atari 2600 port of Gorf. After leaving Midway, Leavens took up work as a freelance developer. Stargunner was developed independently then later sold to Telesys.

Leavens claimed in an interview that video games are an artform and that games "must be graphically appealing". He also claimed that he enjoyed designing games that he himself couldn't beat. Leavens designed Stargunner to be difficult enough for his own taste but not too challenging for the average player. The goal was to put the player "up at about 50,000 points and then get [them] really sweating".

== Reception ==
Stargunner received mixed reception upon its release. Video Games Player magazine called Stargunner "better than average" and "addicting", but also said there was "nothing incredibly new and exciting" about the game. Electronic Fun with Computers and Video Games found the gameplay to be "undistinguished", the graphics "only fair", and the sound effects "uncreative" and "annoying". The Video Game Update recommended the game and called the graphics "simple but clean and quite effective". Michael Wilson from The Logical Gamer saw the game as an improvement from previous TeleSys titles but found the game to be boring and the graphics uninteresting. Wilson's co-reviewer Alan R. Bechtold also found the game's graphics to be simple but was more sympathetic to the gameplay.

The game is also consistently described as resembling Williams Electronics' Defender. The Logical Gamer's Alan R. Bechtold said that while Stargunner was indeed similar to Defender, he enjoyed that Stargunner was a simpler game that could be enjoyed by a wider audience.
