= Fire Fighter (video game) =

1982 video game

- Developer(s): Imagic
- Publisher(s): Imagic
- Designer(s): Brad Stewart
- Platform(s): Atari 2600
- Release: NA: September 1982; EU: 1983
- Genre(s): Action
- Mode(s): Single-player, multiplayer

Fire Fighter is an action video game written by Brad Stewart for the Atari 2600 and published by Imagic in 1982. The player uses fire fighting equipment in an attempt to extinguish the fire in a tall building and rescue the occupants.

== Gameplay ==
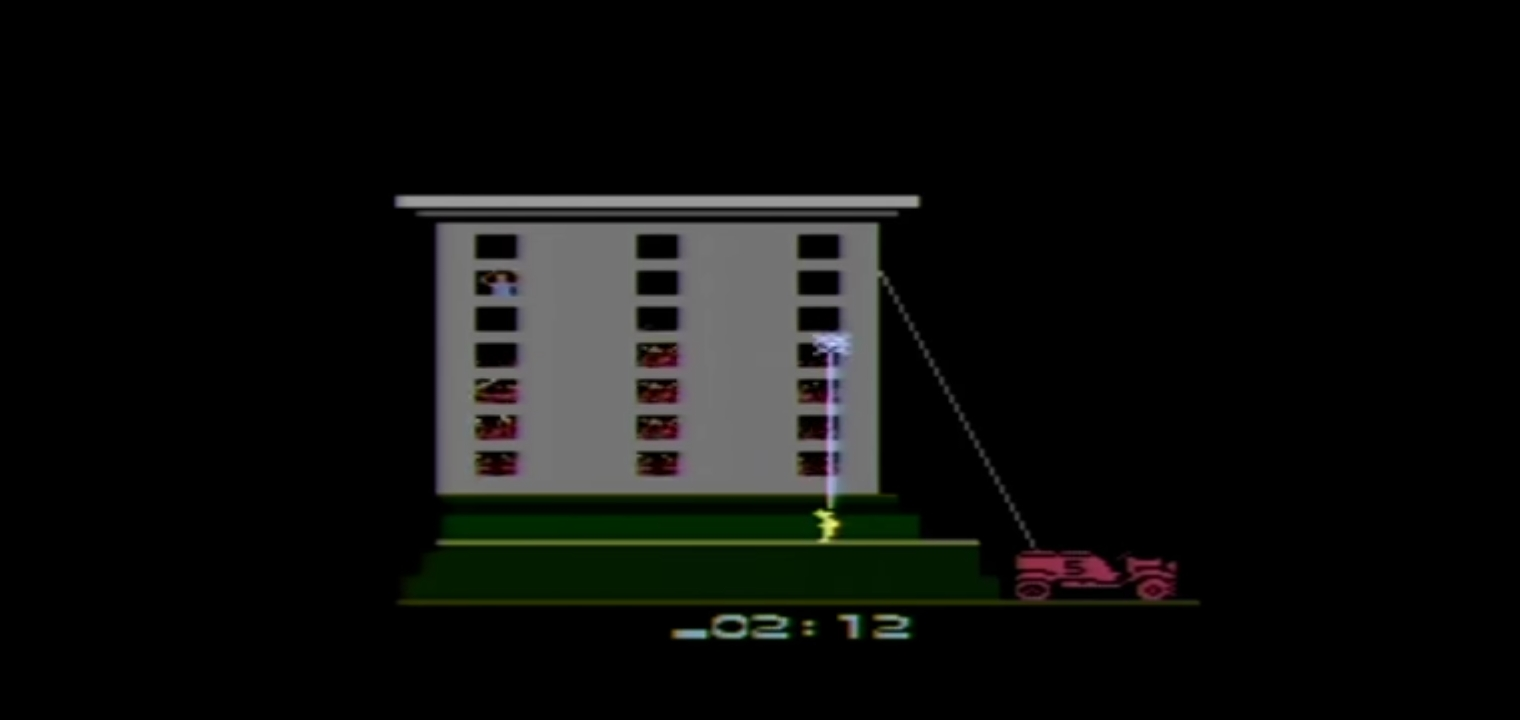
Gameplay screenshot

The player moves a fire fighter around a non-scrolling screen to spray water on fires in a building, the size of which may vary between levels depending on what options are selected. If the fire rises high enough, the person will wait on the roof until the fire burns itself out. At any time, the player can extend a ladder from a fire truck to rescue the person from the building so long as no fire exists on that floor.

The game may be played in single-player mode, or in two-player mode where each player takes turns.

== Reception ==
The contemporary reception to the game was broadly positive. Good Housekeeping praised it, saying "Fire Fighter strikes a positive note by having the player save people and property rather than destroy them". German magazine TeleMatch gave it 4/6, specifically praising its action and gameplay. TV Gamer magazine described it as "a pleasant game that is moderately challenging" though they also noted "the novelty may soon wear off and boredom could set in". Videogaming Illustrated described the game as "not so much fun as an exercise in stubborn, methodical perseverance". The 1983 Book of Atari Software assessed the game as a C+ overall, praising the graphics and the sound, but criticising the replayability.

Retrospective reviewers have been less positive about Fire Fighter. In Classic Home Video Games, 1972-1984: A Complete Reference Guide, Brett Weiss noted that the game "has no real sense of danger" and can be "repetitious and incredibly dull", and summarises it as "arguably the weakest title in the Imagic library". In their review, Classic Game Room described the game as not being at the same level as Imagic's own Demon Attack.

== See also ==
- List of Atari 2600 games
- Towering Inferno, another Atari 2600 fire fighting game from 1982
