= Skycap =

Airport worker

A skycap is a porter employed at an airport and provides the following services to airline passengers:

- Handles luggage, strollers, and car seats
- Performs curbside check-in
- Assists disabled or wheelchair passengers

By tradition, skycaps are tipped for their services. Generally tips are offered per piece of luggage or item; in the United States, tips of $3-5 US per item are common, with higher tips being offered for extra services such as checking overweight or excess bags or getting passengers in front of long lines. Skycaps are found at major or international airports in Canada, where the average charge is $10 for 3 or fewer pieces of baggage and $2 per additional item.

The skycap is the descendant of the redcap, a railway porter. Redcaps were named for their distinctive red hats, which helped them stand out from a crowd so that railway passengers could easily identify them. When commercial airlines became viable, many airlines provided skycap service because people were accustomed to getting assistance from railway porters, and the term "skycap" was coined to describe porters who worked in airports. The first skycap services began in the late 1930s for Douglas DC-3 flights.

Skycaps often wait near the curb or in the baggage claim area, so that they can meet passengers as they arrive with luggage. Most skycaps have access to luggage carts for moving luggage around, and they may also assist with wheelchairs, strollers, and oversized items. Most skycaps also perform curbside check-ins for flights, allowing passengers to skip the lines at the airline's counter, help unload luggage from cars and taxis, and they also answer questions from passengers and family members.

== See also ==
- Airport security
- Bellhop
- Porter (carrier)
- Porter (railroad)
