= Airlock (video game) =

1982 video game

- Developer: Data Age
- Publisher: Data Age
- Platform: Atari 2600
- Release: NA: 1982
- Genre: Platform
- Mode: Single-player

The first level of Airlock

Airlock is a platform video game for the Atari 2600 published by Data Age in 1982. The player runs and jumps through the interior of a crippled submarine with only ten seconds to complete each level.

== Gameplay ==
The objective is to escape a sinking submarine by progressing through its levels and avoiding obstacles within a time limit.

As the player moves up each level of the submarine, they must collect two hatch keys to unlock the elevator that takes them to the next level. The time pressure increases the difficulty, as taking too long will cause the floors to flood, rendering escape impossible and resulting in a loss.

The roaming loose torpedoes from the crash add an additional layer of challenge to the gameplay. Players must jump over these torpedoes to avoid being momentarily stunned and losing precious time. Airlock tests the player's reflexes, decision-making skills, and ability to stay calm under pressure as they race to escape the submarine before it is fully submerged.

== Reception ==
Frank Lovece, writing for Electronic Fun with Computers & Games in 1982, disliked that "there's little to the game once you've passed the first level." He pointed out that because the remaining time carries over to subsequent levels, the game gets easier as you progress.

In a review long after the game's release, Keita Iida concluded: "Graphics are drab in typical Data Age fashion, and sounds consist of nothing more than blips and beeps. On the other hand, it's one of the better efforts by one of the first casualties of the classic videogame era... although that's not saying much."
