= Sssnake =

1982 video game

- The video game cover of the game
- Developer: Data Age
- Publisher: Data Age
- Platform: Atari 2600
- Release: 1982
- Genre: Shoot 'em up
- Modes: Single-player, multiplayer

Sssnake' on Atari 2600

Sssnake is a video game for the Atari 2600 produced by Data Age in 1982. Its gameplay is similar to Centipede, except the player moves in the center of the screen and fires towards the top, bottom and sides.

== Reception ==
In 1991, Digital Press included the game on a list of the ten worst Atari 2600 games.
