= Word Zapper =

1982 Atari 2600 game

- Developer: James Wickstead Design Associates
- Publisher: U.S. Games
- Designer: Henry Will IV
- Platform: Atari 2600
- Release: NA: August 1982
- Mode: Single-player

Word Zapper is an Atari 2600 game written by Henry Will IV and published under the Vidtec label of U.S. Games in 1982. Word Zapper combines spelling exercises with action gaming, as the player must shoot letters that scroll across the top of the screen to complete words.

== Gameplay ==
Word Zapper on Atari 2600

The player controls a spaceship-like "Zapper" which can move about the screen and shoot up, left, and right. The objective is to shoot the letters that spell the current word, in order, while shooting or avoiding asteroids in the lower portion of the screen. There are four types of asteroids, and each has a different effect if it comes into contact with the Zapper. The "Doomsday" asteroid ends the game. The "Scroller" asteroid mixes up the scrolling letters for five seconds. The "Zonker" and "Bonker" asteroids knock the Zapper to the side.

The game ends after being hit by a doomsday asteroid, after the 99 second timer runs down, or the ultimate goal of completing three words.

== Development ==
The movement of the asteroids is based on Space Jockey, also from James Wickstead Design Associates.

== Reception ==
Richard A. Edwards reviewed Word Zapper in The Space Gamer No. 59. Edwards commented that "It is difficult to make a statement concerning recommendation. Word Zapper is innovative enough to draw attention at first, but it will depend on the individual gamer whether another arcade shooting match with letters is worth the price tag."

In the 1983 Arcade Awards, Word Zapper was one of two runners-up for the "Most Innovative Videogame" category.
