= Frankenstein's Monster (video game) =

1983 video game

- Developer: Data Age
- Publisher: Data Age
- Platform: Atari 2600
- Release: 1983
- Genre: Platform game
- Modes: Single-player, multiplayer

Frankenstein's Monster is a platform game developed for the Atari 2600 video game console, based on Mary Shelley's 1818 novel Frankenstein; or, The Modern Prometheus . It was released by Data Age in 1983.

== Plot ==
The player character has to "make his way through the ghoulish castle of Dr. Frankenstein," where he "must prevent him from completing his creation." The player must "gather stones from the dungeon and bring them to the tower where [he] must build a barricade around Frankenstein's monster before he has accumulated enough energy to come alive," which he does using the "Power Probe," a device absorbing energy from an electrical storm.

== Gameplay ==
The player is near the bottom of the screen; the monster at top center.

The player must attempt to stop Frankenstein's monster from coming to life, by building walls around the monster. To do this, the player must retrieve bricks by crossing pits of acid and other obstacles. To fully imprison the monster (and thus, win the game), the player has to make a total of six trips to the lower part of the screen. With each successful trip, more obstacles are placed before the player, making the game more challenging. Contact with spiders and bats deducts points from the player's score. When the timer runs out or the player loses three lives, the monster breaks free and walks towards the screen, becoming larger, eventually taking up the entire screen.

In two player mode, the players take turns and each player has their own timer. When one player falls into the acid pit, her timer pauses until it's his or her turn again and the other player's turn begins. This continues until one player loses three lives, at which point the game will be over.

== Reception ==
In a 1983 review, Electronic Games wrote, "Very charming graphics and an interesting game concept," and compared some elements of the game to Pitfall!.

In 2013 The A.V. Club cited the game as one of the highlights of the platform.
