= Space Jockey (video game) =

1982 video game

- Developer: James Wickstead Design Associates
- Publishers: NA: U.S. Games; PAL: Carrere Video
- Designer: Garry Kitchen
- Platform: Atari 2600
- Release: NA: January 1982; PAL: November 1983
- Genre: Scrolling shooter
- Mode: Single-player

Space Jockey is a horizontally scrolling shooter designed by Garry Kitchen of James Wickstead Design Associates for the Atari VCS (renamed to the Atari 2600 later in the year). It was published under the Vidtec brand of U.S. Games in 1982 as the initial release from the company. The game shipped on a 2K cartridge at a time when most VCS games were 4K. There are 16 game variations.

Space Jockey was the first video game designed by Garry Kitchen. He went on to program the 2600 port of Donkey Kong.

== Gameplay ==
The player's saucer is on the left, flying toward a balloon, plane, and helicopter.

The player controls an "attack saucer" that flies to the right over scrolling, undulating terrain. The saucer only moves vertically and stops just before it hits the ground. The goal is to shoot ground-based tanks and flying enemies: jet planes, propeller planes, helicopters, and hot air balloons.Trees and houses appear on the ground as obstacles which can also be destroyed.

== Development ==
Space Jockey was developed by Gary Kitchen and was his first game for the Atari 2600. It was created during a six-month effort to reverse engineer the console while working at James Wickstead Design Associates. Kitchen later described Space Jockey as "just a modestly fun game" and that it was predominantly a test bed for him during the process of reverse engineering the Atari VCS.

== Release and reception ==
Reception

Review scores
Publication	Score
AllGame	2.5/5
Electronic Fun with Computers and Games	3/4

Space Jockey was released in January 1982. According to a 2013 interview with Kitchen, Space Jockey sold over a million copies, but he believes most of those were at a discount. A February 1983 Billboard article on retailers lowering game prices mentioned, "US Games recently sold off one of its older hits, the 2K Space Jockey, at rock bottom prices through its distributors." A French company called Carrere Video bought the right to sell the game in Europe. They starting selling the game in Germany in November 1983, long after U.S. Games had already been dissolved.

Dan Gutman reviewed Space Jockey in the December 1982 issue of Electronic Fun with Computers & Games. Gutman compared the game to Defender (1981) and Chopper Command (1982) saying that "there is nothing meaty here [...] but that doesn't mean it's bad" and that the game was "a pure test of your reaction time and doesn't pretend to be anything more". Electronic Games found the game to be easy on the default difficulty setting: "the saucer can race through the first 20,000 points of what is intended to be a low-scoring game by just sticking to the lower-left corner of the playfield." Space Jockey was one of three runners-up for the "Best Science Fiction/Fantasy Videogame" category in the 1983 Arcade Awards. German magazine TeleMatch considered the trees at the bottom of the screen to be unpleasant but was decently positive about the graphics and gameplay options.

In a retrospective review, Brett Alan Weiss of online game database AllGame declared the game to be "a simplistic but enjoyable shooter".

== Legacy ==
The enemy movement in Space Jockey was reused in Word Zapper, also from James Wickstead Design Associates.

== See also ==
- Cosmic Commuter
