= Escape (Journey album) =

- Cover art by Stanley Mouse

Studio album by Journey
- Released: July 20, 1981
- Recorded: April–June 1981
- Studio: Fantasy (Berkeley)
- Genre: Rock
- Length: 42:51
- Label: Columbia
- Producer: Mike Stone · Kevin Elson

Journey chronology
Captured (1981)	Escape (1981)	Frontiers (1983)

Singles from Escape
- 1. "Who's Crying Now" Released: July 9, 1981; 2. "Don't Stop Believin'" Released: October 19, 1981; 3. "Open Arms" Released: January 8, 1982; 4. "Still They Ride" Released: May 22, 1982; 5. "Stone in Love" Released: October 29, 1982 (UK)

Escape (stylized as E5C4P3 on the album cover) is the seventh studio album by American rock band Journey, released on July 20, 1981, by Columbia Records. It topped the US Billboard 200 chart and featured four hit Billboard Hot 100 singles – "Don't Stop Believin'" (No. 9), "Who's Crying Now" (No. 4), "Still They Ride" (No. 19) and "Open Arms" (No. 2) – plus rock radio staple "Stone in Love". In July 2021, it was certified Diamond by the Recording Industry of America (RIAA) for at least ten million sales in the US, making it the band's most successful studio album and second most successful album overall behind Greatest Hits. Escape was the fifth-highest selling album of 1981, just behind Bella Donna from Stevie Nicks.

== Background and writing ==
Escape was the band's first album with keyboardist Jonathan Cain, who replaced founding member Gregg Rolie after he left the band at the end of 1980. The album was co-produced by former Lynyrd Skynyrd sound technician Kevin Elson and one-time Queen engineer Mike Stone, who also engineered the album.

== Reception and legacy ==
Professional ratings
Review scores
Source	Rating
AllMusic	4.5/5 stars
Encyclopedia of Popular Music	4/5 stars
The Great Rock Discography	8/10
Rolling Stone	2/5 stars

Mike DeGagne of AllMusic retrospectively awarded Escape four-and-a-half stars out of five, writing, "The songs are timeless, and as a whole, they have a way of rekindling the innocence of youthful romance and the rebelliousness of growing up, built from heartfelt songwriting and sturdy musicianship." Colin Larkin awarded the album four out of five stars in the 2002 edition of the Virgin Encyclopedia of Popular Music. Contemporary Rolling Stone reviews were less favorable. In a review dated October 29, 1981, Deborah Frost dismissed the band as "heavy-metal light-weights" who utilized a "hard-rock pose," and characterized the musicianship as that of "fluffbrained sessioneers." In the 2004 edition of their album guide, Rolling Stone awarded the album two-and-a-half stars out of five, which was nonetheless an improvement from Dave Marsh's one star rating in the 1983 edition of the publication.

In 1988, Kerrang! readers voted Escape the greatest AOR album of all time—Classic Rock expressed the same opinion in 2008. In 1989, Kerrang! ranked Escape number 32 in "The 100 Greatest Heavy Metal Albums of All Time". A 2000 Virgin poll saw the album voted the 24th greatest heavy metal/alternative rock album of all time. In 2001, Classic Rock ranked the album No. 22 in "The 100 Greatest Rock Albums of All Time".

Cash Box described "Still They Ride" as a "bluesy lament" with a "sad, almost mournful" vocal, "doleful acoustic piano work" and "crying guitar notes." Billboard called "Still They Ride" a "soft, lyrical ballad" with similar "tone and style" to "Open Arms".

An Atari 2600 game based on the album, Journey Escape, was released in 1982.

== Track listing ==
All tracks are written by Steve Perry, Neal Schon, and Jonathan Cain, except where noted.

Side one
No.	Title	Writer(s)	Length
1.	"Don't Stop Believin'"		4:11
2.	"Stone in Love"		4:26
3.	"Who's Crying Now"	Perry; Cain	5:01
4.	"Keep on Runnin"		3:40
5.	"Still They Ride"		3:50

Side two
No.	Title	Writer(s)	Length
6.	"Escape"		5:17
7.	"Lay It Down"		4:13
8.	"Dead or Alive"		3:21
9.	"Mother, Father"	N. Schon; Perry; Cain; Matt Schon	5:29
10.	"Open Arms"	Perry; Cain	3:23
Total length:			42:51

2006 Remastered edition bonus tracks
No.	Title	Writer(s)	Length
11.	"La Raza del Sol" (B-side of "Still They Ride" (Alternate Version)	Perry; Cain	3:26
12.	"Don't Stop Believin'" (Live at The Summit, Houston, Texas, November 6, 1981; from Live in Houston 1981: The Escape Tour)		4:19
13.	"Who's Crying Now" (Live at The Summit, Houston, Texas, November 6, 1981; from Live in Houston 1981: The Escape Tour)		5:44
14.	"Open Arms" (Live at The Summit, Houston, Texas, November 6, 1981; from Live in Houston 1981: The Escape Tour)		3:23
Total length:			59:43

2017 Japanese reissue bonus tracks
No.	Title	Writer(s)	Length
15.	"Natural Thing"	Perry; Ross Valory	3:42
16.	"Little Girl"	Schon; Perry; Gregg Rolie	5:50
17.	"Still They Ride" (live)		4:06
Total length:			73:00

== Personnel ==
=== Journey ===
- Steve Perry – lead vocals, producer (tracks 12–14)
- Neal Schon – lead guitar, backing vocals, Roland guitar synthesizer on "Open Arms"
- Jonathan Cain – keyboards, rhythm guitar, backing vocals
- Ross Valory – bass, backing vocals
- Steve Smith – drums

=== Production ===
- Mike Stone, Kevin Elson – producers, engineers, mixing
- Wally Buck – assistant engineer
- Bob Ludwig – original mastering, remastering
- Brian Lee – remastering
- Herbie Herbert – management
- Jim Welch – photography, art direction
- Stanley Mouse – illustrations

== Charts ==
=== Weekly charts ===
Chart (1981–1983)	Peak position
Canada Top Albums/CDs (RPM)	6
German Albums (Offizielle Top 100)	49
Japanese Albums (Oricon)	26
New Zealand Albums (RMNZ)	36
UK Albums (Official Charts)	32
US Billboard 200	1

Chart (2006)	Peak position
Japanese Albums (Oricon)	24

=== Year-end charts ===
Chart (1982)	Position
US Billboard 200	6

Chart (1983)	Position
US Billboard 200	34

== Certifications ==
Region	Certification	Certified units/sales
Canada (Music Canada)	3× Platinum	300,000^{^}
United States (RIAA)	Diamond	10,000,000^{‡}
^{^} Shipments figures based on certification alone.^{‡} Sales+streaming figures based on certification alone.

== See also ==
- Billboard Year-End
- List of Billboard 200 number-one albums of 1981
- List of best-selling albums in the United States
