= U.S. Games =

Defunct American video games company

- Industry: Video games
- Founded: 1978
- Founder: Donald Yu
- Defunct: March 1983
- Fate: Dissolved
- Headquarters: Santa Clara, California, United States

U.S. Games Corporation was an American video game company founded by Donald Yu, which originally produced handheld electronic sports games. It pivoted to focus exclusively on video game software in 1981, and was acquired by cereal company Quaker Oats in 1982 to develop games for the Atari 2600. U.S. Games released their first game, Space Jockey for the Atari 2600, in January 1982, followed by 13 more cartridges in 1982 and 1983. Space Jockey and other early titles used the Vidtec brand name.

Although sometimes cited as an example of non-technology companies attempting to produce video games, Quaker purchased U.S. Games to work with its Fisher-Price toy brand and compete with rival cereal company General Mills's Parker Brothers division.

U.S. Games hoped to, like Parker Brothers, gain a reputation for quality, licensed family-oriented games. Parker Brothers had a very successful 1982 in the video game market, with hits like Frogger and The Empire Strikes Back. U.S. Games's titles sold poorly, and Quaker closed the division during the video game crash of 1983, before U.S. Games could use its newly acquired Pink Panther license. "None of our games became a hit," said spokesman Ronald Bottrell. "Instead of pouring in a lot more capital, we decided to drop it". U.S. Games was dissolved in March 1983. Quaker Oats claimed it was taking a $1.9 million write off on the subsidiary and that it "didn't forsee the rapid oversaturation" of home console games.

A number of U.S. Games titles were later sold in continental Europe by the French company Carrere Video, which started selling the games at the end of 1983, well after the dissolution.

== Published titles ==
In order of product number:

- Space Jockey
- Sneak 'n Peek
- Word Zapper
- Commando Raid
- Name This Game
- Towering Inferno
- M.A.D.
- Gopher
- Squeeze Box
- Eggomania
- Picnic
- Piece o' Cake
- Raft Rider
- Entombed
