= Avalanche (video game) =

1978 video game

- Promotional flyer
- Developer: Atari, Inc.
- Publishers: Atari, Inc.
- Designer: Dennis Koble
- Platforms: Arcade, Atari 8-bit, Atari 2600
- Release: Arcade: NA: April 1978; Atari 2600: August 15, 2025
- Genre: Action
- Mode: Single-player

Avalanche is a 1978 arcade video game designed by Dennis Koble and released by Atari, Inc.. The object is to catch falling rocks with a controllable set of paddles that diminish in number and size as the rocks fall faster and faster.

A port of the game was developed by Koble to help kickstart the Atari Program Exchange. The game influenced the Activision game Kaboom! (1981) for the Atari 2600, which went on to be one of the top-selling Atari 2600 video games. In 2025, Atari released official ports for the 2600 and 7800 consoles.

== Gameplay ==
Avalanche is for 1 or 2 players, alternating turns. There are six rows of rocks at the top of the screen. The game starts with a six-storied platform and the player loses one platform per row of rocks cleared. The player scores points for the rocks they prevent from reaching the ground. The further the row of rocks, the smaller and faster they become. The ultimate goal is to get enough points so that the player can continue the game should they lose their first one.

== Development ==
Dennis Koble joined Atari in 1976 and was the fourth programmer the company had hired. He would work for two-and-a-half years on various arcade games for the company such as Sprint 2 (1976) and Dominos (1977) and his last published arcade game Avalanche.

Avalanche started out as a game about eggs and baskets called Catch. The game initially performed poorly with test audiences which led the game to be changed to be about collecting rocks and was eventually renamed Avalanche. Ed Logg, who started at Atari in February 1978, was assigned to projects that were either completed or started by Koble, who was moving on to the consumer division of the company. Logg said that by the time he got to Avalanche, it was about to go into production and his job was to focus on working on Koble's incomplete and unreleased arcade game Dirt Bike.

Avalanche is housed in a custom cabinet that includes two large lit start buttons and a rotary controller. The side art and bezel feature groupings of rocks with extending lines meant to convey the motion of falling rocks. The screen is black and white with two colored strips to provide colored rows of graphics as in Breakout.

The circuit board is based on the 6502 CPU, with game code stored in multiple ROMs. All game text is selectable to 4 different languages: English, French, German, or Spanish. Avalanche also has a built-in self-test diagnostic program that displays all microprocessor and memory functions, including the operator switches and functions.

== Release ==
Avalanche was shipped to the public in April 1978. Paul Drury of Retro Gamer described Avalanche as a moderate success at the arcades. In the early 1980s, Atari, Inc. supported their 8-bit computers with the Atari Program Exchange (APX). The APX solicited software written by Atari users and sold the best via mail order catalogs. Koble said to get the ball rolling on the project, he submitted a video game port of Avalanche, followed by two adventure games: Chinese Puzzle and Sultan's Palace.

Both the arcade and Atari 8-bit versions of Avalanche were added as downloadable content for the Atari 50 (2022) video game compilation on September 26, 2024. On August 15, 2025, Atari released Avalanche for the Atari 2600. The conversion was originally developed by John Champeau and released in 2007. The Atari published version includes an expert skill level added and new gameplay options.

== Legacy ==
Avalanche inspired the game Kaboom! (1981) designed by Larry Kaplan. Kaplan was open about the influence in later interviews, saying "I just ripped off Avalanche." Kaboom! went on to be one of the best-selling games for the Atari 2600. Steve Bloom in Video Games compared Kaboom!'s popularity to Avalanche in 1982, describing Koble's game as "a great example of a game that everybody has played but probably doesn't know."

Reflecting on his work at Atari, Koble said in an interview published in 1983 that he "can truly say [Avalanche] was a totally original game."
