= Fast Food (1982 video game) =

- Promotional art
- Developer: Telesys
- Designer: Don Ruffcorn
- Platform: Atari 2600
- Release: NA: 1982
- Genre: Action

Fast Food is an action game for the Atari 2600 written by Don Ruffcorn and published by Telesys in 1982. The player moves an animated mouth around the screen, colliding with food to eat it. Consuming a purple pickle results in the loss of a life.

== Gameplay ==
The player controlled mouth is at bottom center, facing an ice cream cone. At right is a dangerous purple pickle.

The player controls a pair of disembodied lips, similar to a Chattery Teeth toy, named Mighty Mouth. Various fast food menu items fly across the screen and the mouth earns points by catching them. The player must avoid eating the purple pickles. After eating 6 purple pickles, the screen is replaced by large text reading "BURP!", followed by "CLOSED". As the player acquires more points, the speed of the game increases. The transitions between speeds are indicated by the text "YOU'RE GETTING FATTER".

== Reception ==
Fast Food received a Certificate of Merit in the category of "Most Humorous Home Arcade Game" at the 4th annual Arkie Awards.
