= Videogaming Illustrated =

Former US video game magazine

- Issue 1, August 1982
- Editor-in-Chief: Jeff Rovin
- Categories: Video game journalism
- Frequency: (Bi)Monthly
- Publisher: Jeff Rovin, Bill DuBay
- Founder: Jeff Rovin
- Founded: 1982
- First issue: August 1982
- Final issue Number: March 1984; 14
- Company: Ion International Inc.
- Country: USA
- Based in: Bethel, Connecticut
- Language: English
- ISSN: 0739-4373
- OCLC: 9752913

Videogaming Illustrated, also known as VGI, was a video game magazine published in the United States and ran from August 1982 to March 1984.

== History ==
VGI changed its title twice: in issue June 1983 to Videogaming and Computer Gaming Illustrated and in issue January 1984 to Video and Computer Gaming Illustrated.

It began life as a bi-monthly publication before becoming a monthly publication. Its short run has been explained by the video game crash of 1983.

== Content ==
The magazine was split up into the following sections:

- Keyboard
- Preview
- Eye On
- VIP
- Input
- Focus On
- RAMblings

The Star Words section featured commentary about computer games from celebrities such as Charlton Heston and Kirk Douglas.

== See also ==
- Computer Gaming World
- List of video game magazines
