= List of Atari 7800 games =

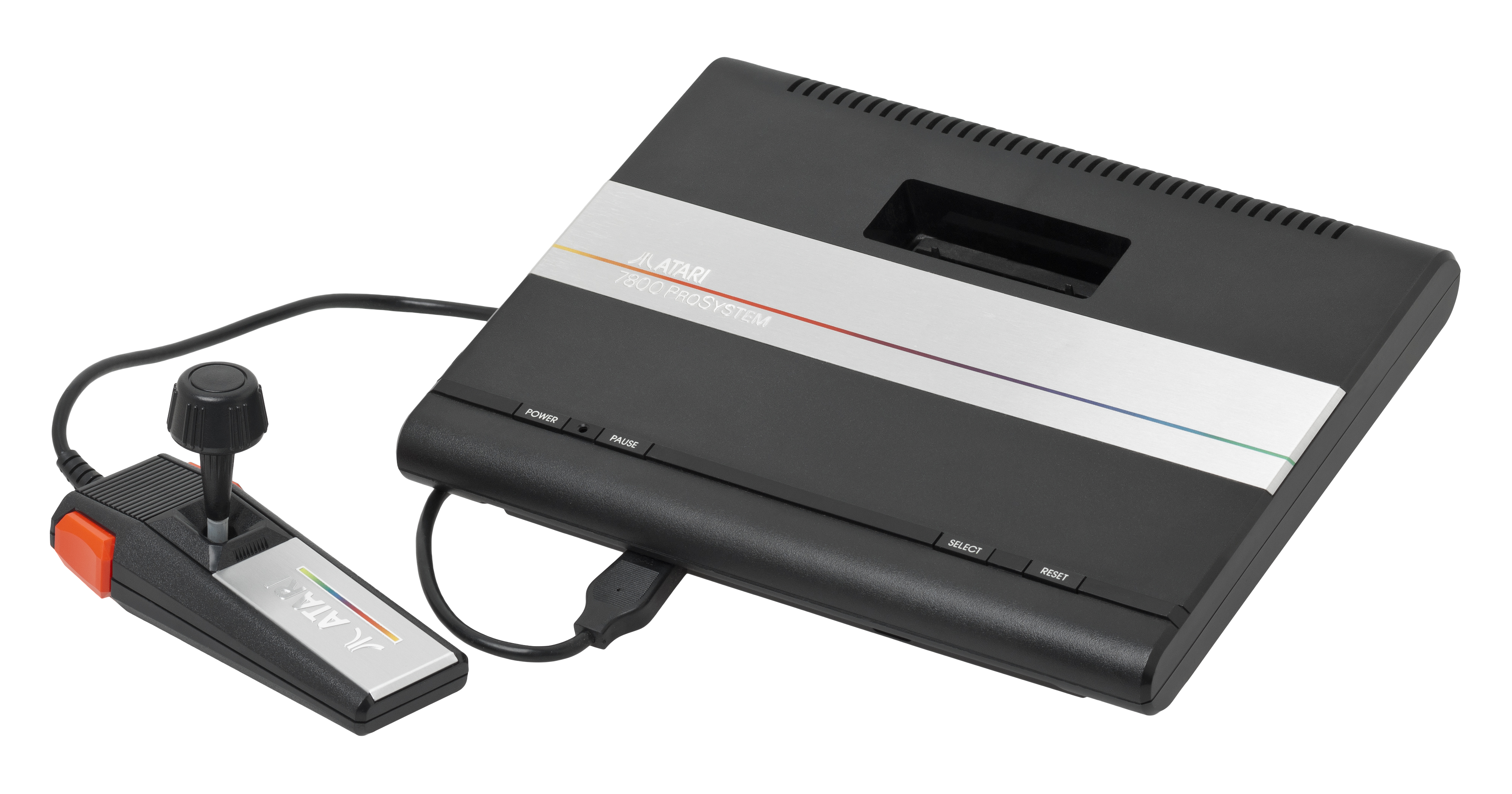
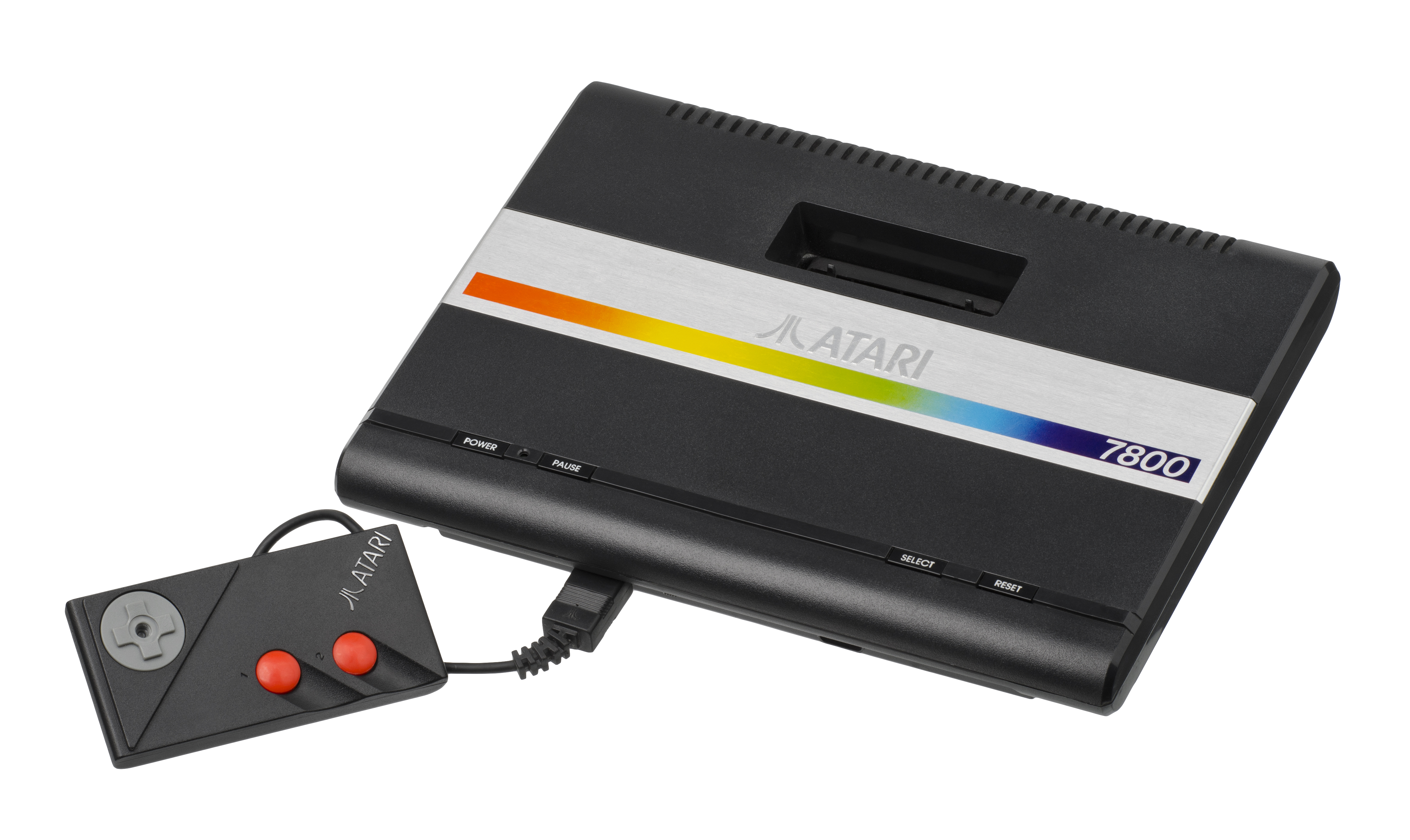
Left to right: North American and European Atari 7800 models

The Atari 7800 is an 8-bit console developed by Atari Corporation and designed by General Computer Corporation. It was released in North America in May 1986. The 7800 is backward compatible with most Atari 2600 cartridges. This list contains all of the games released by Atari Corporation, games released by Atari Interactive Inc. for the 2600+ | 7800+ Console, as well as unlicensed aftermarket games and games which were cancelled at some point in development. In total, 59 (Note: This number is always up to date by this script.) games were officially released for the Atari 7800 Between 1986 and 1990. 10 games were developed for the Atari 7800+ and released in 2024 by Atari, Inc. To date there are a total of 69 official releases along with over 100 hacks, 3rd Party Indie Games, unreleased prototypes and homebrews released on cartridge for the 7800.

Regions released	Region description	Released
NA (North America)	North America and other NTSC territories.	67
PAL	PAL/SECAM territories: much of Europe and Australia.	61

== Commercially released games (1986-1991) ==
Title	Developer(s)	Publisher(s)	Release Date	Region(s) released	CX Number	Ref
32 in 1	Atari Corporation	Atari Corporation	1988	PAL	CX 26163	
Ace of Aces	Nova Game Design	Atari Corporation	May 1989	NA, PAL	CX 7846	
Alien Brigade	Atari Corporation	Atari Corporation	1991	NA, PAL	CX 7855	
Asteroids	General Computer Corporation	Atari Corporation	May 1986	NA, PAL	CX 7802	
Ballblazer	General Computer Corporation	Atari Corporation	March 1988	NA, PAL	CX 7815	
Barnyard Blaster	James Zalewski	Atari Corporation	1991	NA, PAL	CX 7859	
Basketbrawl	BlueSky Software	Atari Corporation	1990	NA, PAL	CX 7880	
Centipede	General Computer Corporation	Atari Corporation	May 1986	NA, PAL	CX 7801	
Choplifter	Ibid, Inc.	Atari Corporation	August 1987	NA, PAL	CX 7821	
Commando	Sculptured Software	Atari Corporation	November 1989	NA, PAL	CX 7838	
Crack'ed	Robert Neve	Atari Corporation	April 1989	NA, PAL	CX 7836	
Crossbow	Imagineering	Atari Corporation	April 1989	NA, PAL	CX 7844	
Dark Chambers	Sculptured Software	Atari Corporation	April 1989	NA, PAL	CX 7837	
Desert Falcon	General Computer Corporation	Atari Corporation	August 1988	NA, PAL	CX 7811	
Dig Dug	General Computer Corporation	Atari Corporation	May 1986	NA, PAL	CX 7803	
Donkey Kong	International Technology Development Corporation	Atari Corporation	November 1988	NA, PAL	CX 7848	
Donkey Kong Jr.	International Technology Development Corporation	Atari Corporation	November 1988	NA, PAL	CX 7849	
Double Dragon	Imagineering	Activision	November 1989	NA, PAL	CX 7897	
F-18 Hornet	Imagineering	Absolute Entertainment	December 1988	NA, PAL	N/A	
Fatal Run	Sculptured Software	Atari Corporation	1991	NA (Released in NA 2024), PAL	CX 7854	
Fight Night	Imagineering	Atari Corporation	April 1989	NA, PAL	CX 7851	
Food Fight	General Computer Corporation	Atari Corporation	May 1986	NA, PAL	CX 7804	
Galaga	General Computer Corporation	Atari Corporation	August 1986	NA, PAL	CX 7805	
Hat Trick	Ibid, Inc.	Atari Corporation	December 1988	NA, PAL	CX 7829	
Ikari Warriors	Imagineering	Atari Corporation	1990	NA, PAL	CX 7862	
Impossible Mission	Man Development Corp.	Atari Corporation	December 1988	NA, PAL	CX 7832	
Jinks	Softgold	Atari Corporation	September 1989	NA, PAL	CX 7857	
Joust	General Computer Corporation	Atari Corporation	May 1986	NA, PAL	CX 7806	
Karateka	Ibid, Inc.	Atari Corporation	October 1987	NA, PAL	CX 7822	
Kung-Fu Master	Imagineering	Absolute Entertainment	1989	NA, PAL	N/A	
Mario Bros.	International Technology Development Corporation	Atari Corporation	December 1988	NA, PAL	CX 7850	
Mat Mania Challenge	BlueSky Software	Atari Corporation	1990	NA, PAL	CX 7863	
Mean 18 Ultimate Golf	BlueSky Software	Atari Corporation	1990	NA, PAL	CX 7847	
Meltdown	Atari Corporation	Atari Corporation	1991	NA, PAL	CX 7805	
Midnight Mutants	Radioactive Software	Atari Corporation	1991	NA, PAL	CX 7889	
Motor Psycho	BlueSky Software	Atari Corporation	1991	NA, PAL	CX 7852	
Ms. Pac-Man	General Computer Corporation	Atari Corporation	May 1986	NA, PAL	CX 7807	
Ninja Golf	BlueSky Software	Atari Corporation	1990	NA, PAL	CX 7870	
One-on-One Basketball	Man Development Corp.	Atari Corporation	October 1987	NA, PAL	CX 7824	
Pete Rose Baseball	Absolute Entertainment	Absolute Entertainment	1989	NA, PAL	N/A	
Planet Smashers	Datafast Computer Services	Atari Corporation	1990	NA, PAL	CX 7868	
Pole Position II (Note: Included as pack-in title)	General Computer Corporation	Atari Corporation	May 1986	NA, PAL	CX 7808	
Rampage	Activision	Activision	November 1989	NA	CX 7898	
RealSports Baseball	Atari Corporation	Atari Corporation	March 1989	NA	CX 7834	
Robotron: 2084	General Computer Corporation	Atari Corporation	May 1986	NA	CX 7809	
Scrapyard Dog	BlueSky Software	Atari Corporation	1991	NA, PAL	CX 7879	
Sentinel	Imagineering	Atari Corporation	1991	PAL	CX 7869	
Summer Games	Epyx	Atari Corporation	August 1988	NA	CX 7826	
Super Huey UH-IX	Atari Corporation	Atari Corporation	May 1989	NA, PAL	CX 7828	
Super Skateboardin	Absolute Entertainment	Absolute Entertainment	December 1988	NA, PAL	N/A	
Tank Command	Froggo	Froggo	1988	NA	N/A	
Title Match Pro Wrestling	Absolute Entertainment	Absolute Entertainment	1989	NA, PAL	N/A	
Tomcat: The F-14 Fighter Simulator	Absolute Entertainment	Absolute Entertainment	March 1989	NA, PAL	N/A	
Touchdown Football	Imagineering	Atari Corporation	March 1989	NA	CX 7823	
Tower Toppler	Hewson Consultants	Atari Corporation	January 1989	NA, PAL	CX 7856	
Water Ski	Froggo	Froggo	1988	NA	N/A	
Winter Games	Epyx	Atari Corporation	August 1988	NA	CX 7831	
Xenophobe	BlueSky Software	Atari Corporation	September 1989	NA, PAL	CX 7858	
Xevious	General Computer Corporation	Atari Corporation	November 1986	NA, PAL	CX 7810	

== Licensed homebrew (1991-2023) ==
Title	Developer(s)	Publisher(s)	Year	Region(s) released	Ref
2048	Muddy Vision	AtariAge	2022	NA, PAL	
A.R.T.I.	Muddy Vision	AtariAge	2023	NA, PAL	
A Roach in Space II: Cosmic Bugaloo	VHZC Games	AtariAge	2022	NA	
Attack of the PETSCII Robots	The 8-Bit Guy	AtariAge	2022	NA, PAL	
Danger Zone	Muddy Vision	AtariAge	2022	NA	
Dragon's Cache	Todd Furmanski	AtariAge	2021	NA	
Dragon's Descent	Todd Furmanski	AtariAge	2021	NA	
Dragon's Havoc	Todd Furmanski	AtariAge	2022	NA, PAL	
Death Merchant	Steve Engelhardt	AtariAge	2023		
E.X.O	Muddy Vision	AtariAge	2023	NA, PAL	
GoSub	Chris Read	Atari 2600 Land	2020	NA	
Hearty Manslapper	Clark Otto Jr.	Self	2016	NA	
Harpy's Curse	Todd Furmanski	AtariAge	2023	NA, PAL	
Knight Guy in a Low Res World- Castle Days	VHZC Games	AtariAge	2021	NA	
Knight Guy on a Board- 30 Squares of Fate	VHZC Games	AtariAge	2022	NA	
Lava Lamps & 8-Track Theatre: The Video Game	Clark Otto Jr., Isabella Acuna	Self	2018	NA	
Millie & Molly	MK Smith	AtariAge	2021	NA	
Plumb Luck DX	Blake Smith	AtariAge	2023		
Putt 18	Lance Ringquist	Video61	2020	NA	
Rikki & Vikki	PenguiNet	PenguiNet	2019	NA, PAL	
Robot Finds Kitten	Thomas Mathys	Self	2005	NA	
Santa Simon	Matthias Luedtke	AtariAge	2006	NA	
Serpentine	RevEng	AtariAge	2016	NA	
Slide Boy in Maze Land	VHZC Games	AtariAge	2022	NA, PAL	
T:ME Salvo	Mike Saarna	AtariAge	2016	NA, PAL	
Wasp!	Mark Ball	AtariAge	2009	NA	
Wizard's Dungeon	BydoEmpire	AtariAge	2021	NA, PAL	
Worm!	Mark Ball	AtariAge	2010	NA	

== Atari 7800 Plus Era games (2024-present) ==
Title	Developer(s)	Publisher(s)	Year	Region(s) released	CX Number	Ref
Asteroids Deluxe	Robert DeCrescenzo	Atari Interactive Inc.	2024	NA, PAL	CX 78104	
MV Sports	Muddy Vision	9-Bit Robot	TBA		N/A	
Bently Bear's Crystal Quest	Robert DeCrescenzo	Atari Interactive Inc.	2024	NA, PAL	CX 7899	
Block'em Sock'em	Darryl Guenther	AtariAge	2025	NA, PAL	N/A	
Berzerk	Robert DeCrescenzo	Atari Interactive Inc.	2024	NA, PAL	CX 78103	
Bernie & The Tower of Doom	Muddy Vision	AtariAge	2025	NA, PAL	N/A	
Bounty Bob Strikes Back	Robert DeCrescenzo	Atari Interactive Inc.	2024	NA, PAL	CX 78100	
Countermeasure 2	Robert DeCrescenzo	Atari Interactive Inc.	2025	NA, PAL	CX 78107	
deadmau5 Meowingtons’ Revenge	General Computer Corporation	Atari Interactive Inc.	2025	NA, PAL	CX 73107	
Drone Patrol	Steve Engelhardt	AtariAge	2025	NA, PAL	N/A	
Knight Guy On Board: 30 Squares of Fate	VHZC Games	9-Bit Robot	TBA		N/A	
Knight Guy in Another Castle	Zachary Scolaro	AtariAge	2025	NA, PAL	N/A	
Flying Shark	Plaion	Atari Interactive Inc.	TBA	NA, PAL	TBA	
Frenzy	Robert DeCrescenzo	Atari Interactive Inc.	2024	NA, PAL	CX 78102	
Game of the Bear: Polar Opposites	VHZC Games	9-Bit Robot	TBA		N/A	
Mattress Monkeys	Zachary Scolaro	AtariAge	2025	NA, PAL	N/A	
Mouse Trap	Darryl Guenther	AtariAge	2025	NA, PAL	N/A	
Pac-Man: Double Feature	Robert DeCrescenzo (Pac-Man 7800) / Tod Frye (Pac-Man 2600)	Atari Interactive Inc.	2025	NA, PAL	CX 78116	
Slap Fight	Plaion	Atari Interactive Inc.	TBA	NA, PAL	TBA	
Space Duel	Robert DeCrescenzo	Atari Interactive Inc.	2024	NA, PAL	CX 78108	
Slayin 7800	Pixel Licker	9-Bit Robot	TBA		N/A	
Super Circus Atari	Robert DeCrescenzo	Atari Interactive Inc.	2025	NA, PAL	CX 78101	
Tiger-Heli	Plaion	Atari Interactive Inc.	2025	NA, PAL	CX 78121	
Tunnels of Hyperion	VHZC Games	AtariAge	2025	NA, PAL	N/A	
Twin Cobra	Plaion	Atari Interactive Inc.	TBA	NA, PAL	TBA	
Wilf: An Annelid Aventure	Muddy Vision	9-Bit Robot	TBA		N/A	

== Unlicensed homebrew ==
Title	Developer(s)	Publisher(s)	Release date(s)	Region(s) released
Alpha Race	Brek Brixius	Good Deal Games	2015	NA
Armor Attack II	Robert DeCrescenzo	AtariAge	2013	NA
Asteroids Deluxe	Robert DeCrescenzo	AtariAge	2007	NA
Astro Blaster	Robert DeCrescenzo	AtariAge	2014	NA
Astro Fighter	Robert DeCrescenzo	AtariAge	2015	NA
b*nQ	Ken Siders	AtariAge	2007	NA
Baby Pac-Man	Robert DeCrescenzo	AtariAge	2019	NA
Beef Drop	Ken Siders	AtariAge	2006	NA
Beef Drop VE	Ken Siders	AtariAge	2007	NA
Bentley Bear's Crystal Quest	Robert DeCrescenzo	AtariAge	2013	NA
Combat 1990	Harry Dodgson	Video61	2005	NA
Crazy Brix	Robert DeCrescenzo	AtariAge	2011	NA
Crazy Otto	Robert DeCrescenzo	AtariAge	2013	NA
DK Deluxe	Perry Thuente	Opcode Games	2026	NA, PAL
Dungeon Stalker	Mike Saarna, Steve Engelhardt	AtariAge	2015	NA
FailSafe	Robert DeCrescenzo	AtariAge	2010	NA
Frenzy	Robert DeCrescenzo	AtariAge	2013	NA
Hangly-Man	Nittoh	Robert DeCrescenzo	2005	NA
Jr. Pac-Man	Robert DeCrescenzo	AtariAge	2009	NA, PAL
K.C. Munchkin!	Robert DeCrescenzo	AtariAge	2014	NA
Klax	BlueSky Software	ResQsoft Productions	2002	NA
Keystone Koppers	Muddy Vision	Opcode Games	2025	NA, PAL
Ms. Pac-Attack	Two-Bit Score	Robert DeCrescenzo	2005	NA
Pac-Man	Robert DeCrescenzo	Robert DeCrescenzo	2005	NA
Pac-Man Collection	Robert DeCrescenzo	AtariAge	2006	NA
Pac-Man Plus	Robert DeCrescenzo	Robert DeCrescenzo	2005	NA
Pac-Pollux	Robert DeCrescenzo	Gambler172	2006	NA
Popeye	Darryl Guenther	Opcode Games	2025	NA, PAL
Rip Off	Robert DeCrescenzo	AtariAge	2012	NA
Scramble	Robert DeCrescenzo	AtariAge	2012	NA
Serpentine	RevEng	AtariAge	2016	NA
Space Duel	Robert DeCrescenzo	AtariAge	2007	NA
Space Invaders	Robert DeCrescenzo	AtariAge	2008	NA
Super Circus AtariAge	Robert DeCrescenzo	AtariAge	2010	NA
Super Pac-Man	Robert DeCrescenzo	AtariAge	2008	NA
UniWarS	Robert DeCrescenzo	AtariAge	2021	NA

== Cancelled games ==
Title	Developer(s)	Publisher(s)	Notes/Reasons
Crystal Castles	Atari Corporation	Atari Corporation	Port of the 1983 arcade original.
Electrocop	ICC	Atari Corporation	Conversion of the Atari Lynx original.
Elevator Action	—N/a	Atari Corporation	Port of the 1983 arcade original.
Escape from the Mindmaster	—N/a	—N/a	Port of the Atari 2600 original.
Gato	Ibid Inc. Software	Atari Corporation	Port of the MS-DOS original. Development started but not completed beyond a demo.
Gauntlet	—N/a	Atari Corporation	Port of the 1985 arcade original.
Gremlins	—N/a	Atari Corporation	Based upon Warner Bros. and Amblin Entertainment's 1984 eponymous film.
Lode Runner	—N/a	Atari Corporation	Only a single screenshot exists.
Millipede	—N/a	Atari Corporation	Port of the 1982 arcade original. Unknown if development work was started beyond announcement.
Missing in Action	Sculptured Software	TNT Games	Based upon The Cannon Group's 1984 eponymous film. 85% complete.
Moon Patrol	—N/a	Atari Corporation	Port of the 1982 arcade original.
Night of the Ninja	Froggo	Froggo	
Paperboy	Tiertex Design Studios	Atari Corporation	Port of the 1985 arcade original. It was finished and working, looked great and was sent to Atari and never seen again.
Pit-Fighter	Imagitec Design	Atari Corporation	Port of the 1990 arcade original. A ROM image was reportedly found from a development kit of a former Atari employee.
Plutos	Tynesoft	—N/a	Port of the Amiga and Atari ST original. A ROM image was found from a development kit.
Pyromania	Froggo	Froggo	
Quest for Quintana Roo	VSS, Inc.	Telegames	Port of the Atari 2600 and ColecoVision original.
Rampart	Imagitec Design	Atari Corporation	Port of the 1990 arcade original. An early playable build was found.
Rescue on Fractalus!	General Computer Corporation	Atari Corporation	Port of the Atari 8-bit and Atari 5200 original. A ROM image was found in 2004 under ownership of GCC programmers.
Road Riot 4WD	—N/a	Atari Corporation	Port of the 1991 arcade original.
Sarge	—N/a	Atari Corporation	Port of the 1985 arcade original.
Scrapper Story	—N/a	—N/a	
Scorpion Squad	Froggo	Froggo	
Sirius	Tynesoft	—N/a	Port of the Amiga original Sirius 7. A ROM image was found from a development kit.
Skyfox	—N/a	Atari Corporation	Port of the Apple II original. Only a single screenshot and preliminary packaging exists.
Stargate	—N/a	Atari Corporation	Port of the 1981 arcade original.
Steel Talons	—N/a	Atari Corporation	Port of the 1991 arcade original.
Tempest	—N/a	Atari Corporation	Port of the 1981 arcade original. Engineering Notes list development of the 7800 conversion being 15–20% completed but no code has been found to date.
The Eidilon	—N/a	Atari Corporation	
Toki	Imagitec Design	Atari Corporation	Port of the 1989 arcade original. A nearly-complete playable ROM image was discovered on a development kit.
Track & Field	—N/a	Atari Corporation	Port of the 1983 arcade original.
UFO	Froggo	Froggo	
White Water Madness	—N/a	Atari Corporation	

== See also ==
- Lists of video games
- List of Atari 2600 games
