= List of Atari VCS (2021 console) games =

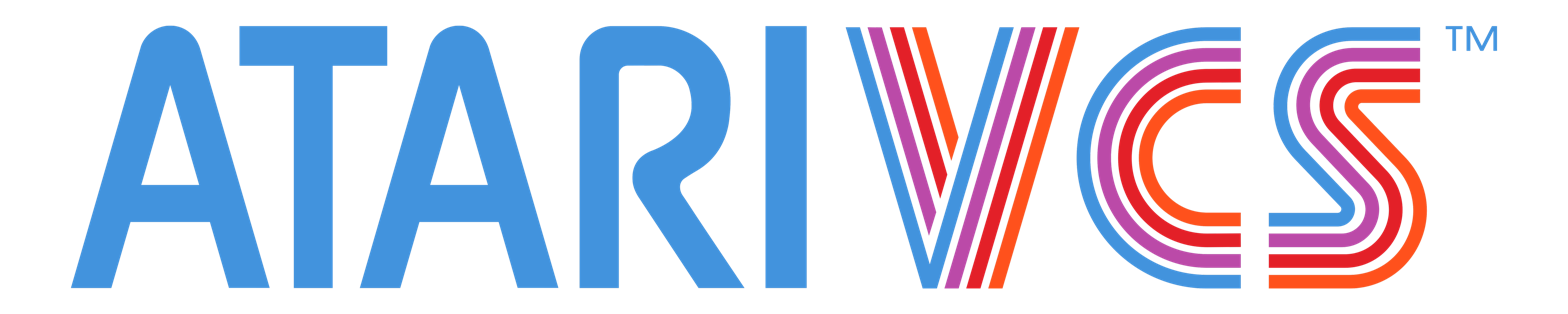
The Atari VCS logo

This is a list of games released on the 2021 Atari VCS. Games are purchased online directly from the console using the Atari VCS store.

Atari VCS Vault, which is a collection of over one hundred classic Atari games, is available for free on the system. Volume 1 is pre-loaded on the console, while Volume 2 can be downloaded from the console's digital storefront.

== Games ==
Title	Developer	Publisher	Release date	Notes
1-2-Word Search DX	TreeFall Studios L.L.C.	TreeFall Studios L.L.C.	November 27, 2024	
Adventure	Atari, Inc.	Atari, Inc.	March 25, 2022	Atari 2600
Aery - A Journey Beyond Time	EpiXR Games UG	EpiXR Games UG	August 27, 2021	
Aery - Sky Castle	EpiXR Games UG	EpiXR Games UG	September 10, 2021	
Aery - Little Bird Adventure	EpiXR Games UG	EpiXR Games UG	March 23, 2021	
Aery - Broken Memories	EpiXR Games UG	EpiXR Games UG	September 24, 2021	
AVIGA Trio	Tucasoft	Tucasoft	May 3, 2024	
Akka Arrh	Llamasoft Ltd.	Atari, Inc.	February 21, 2023	
Alien Abduction 2600	John Van Ryzin	Atari, Inc.	May 5, 2023	No longer available (11/2/23)
Alien Brigade	Ken Grant	Atari, Inc.	December 10, 2021	Atari 7800
Amoeba Jump	Dionoid	AtariAge	June 2, 2023	
Ancient War in the Skies	MicroProse	Atari, Inc.	February 4, 2022	DOSBox
Annihilation	TreeFall Studios L.L.C.	TreeFall Studios L.L.C.	February 23, 2024	
Apolune 2	Lost Astronaut Studios	Lost Astronaut Studios	August 12, 2022	
Aquaventure	Gary Shannon, Tod Frye	Atari, Inc.	August 26, 2022	Atari XP release
A.R.T.I. 7800	MuddyVision	MuddyVision	October 14, 2023	
Asteroid v Claw	Metgan Games	Metgan Games	April 19, 2024	
Asteroids	Atari, Inc.	Atari, Inc.	December 17, 2021	Atari 7800
Asteroids Deluxe: 7800	Bob DeCrescenzo	AtariAge	April 26, 2024	
Asteroids: Recharged	Adamvision Studios, SneakyBox	Atari, Inc.	December 14, 2021	
Atari 50: The Anniversary Celebration	Digital Eclipse	Atari, Inc.	December 20, 2022	
Atari Mania	iLLOGIKA Studios	Atari, Inc.	October 13, 2022	
Atari VCS Vault	Code Mystics	Atari, Inc.	December 11, 2020	
Atari VCS Vault 2	Code Mystics	Atari, Inc.	December 11, 2020	
Ato	Tiny Warrior Games	Tiny Warrior Games	February 3, 2021	
Avian Knights	Alan-1, Inc.	Alan-1, Inc.	May 12, 2023	
Basketbroom	Metgan Games	Metgan Games	October 17, 2023	
Basketbrawl	Atari, Inc.	Atari, Inc.	October 15, 2021	Atari 7800
Battle Rockets	Gumbo Machine, LLC	Gumbo Machine, LLC	December 1, 2023	
Berzerk	Stern Electronics, Atari, Inc.	Atari, Inc.	March 17, 2023	Atari 2600
Berzerk: Recharged	SneakyBox	Atari, Inc.	November 9, 2023	
Biolab Wars	2ndBoss	2ndBoss	August 30, 2023	
Black Widow: Recharged	Adamvision Studios, SneakyBox	Atari, Inc.	October 28, 2021	
Block'em Sock'em	Adam Welch	John Hancock	April 5, 2024	Atari 7800
Bloo Kid	Winterworks GmbH	Winterworks GmbH	November 3, 2023	
Bloo Kid 2	Winterworks GmbH	Winterworks GmbH	November 3, 2023	
Boulder Dash Deluxe	BBG Entertainment GmbH	BBG Entertainment GmbH	December 24, 2020	
BPM Boy	RetroNinja Inc.	RetroNinja Inc.	June 10, 2022	
Breakout: Recharged	Adamvision Studios, SneakyBox	Atari, Inc.	February 10, 2022	
Cash Cow DX	pixel games SARL-S	pixel games SARL-S	March 29, 2024	
Breakout	Atari, Inc.	Atari, Inc.	March 18, 2022	Atari 2600
Catacombs of Chaos	Gemintronic	John Hancock, Jason Santuci	June 16, 2023	Atari 2600
Catty & Batty: The Spirit Guide	Philipp Lehner	Philipp Lehner	May 20, 2022	
Caverns of Mars: Recharged	Adamvision Studios, SneakyBox	Atari, Inc.	March 9, 2023	
Centipede: Recharged	Adamvision Studios, SneakyBox	Atari, Inc.	September 28, 2021	
Centipede	Atari, Inc.	Atari, Inc.	January 14, 2022	Atari 7800
Circus Atari	Atari, Inc.	Atari, Inc.	December 1, 2023	Atari 2600
Circus Interstellar	Ettinsoft	Ettinsoft	May 10, 2024	
Cosmic PANIC	Sumoshell Bombfunk	Sumoshell Bombfunk	February 23, 2024	
Crusade In Europe	MicroProse	Atari, Inc.	February 18, 2022	DOSBox
Crystal Quest	Bob DeCrescenzo	AtariAge	February 9, 2024	Atari 7800
Cymatically Muffed	Kelsam	Kelsam	September 22, 2023	
Dark Chambers	John Howard Palevich, Joel Gluck	Atari Exchange, Antic Software, Electric Dream	October 29, 2021	Atari 7800
The Darkside Detective	Spooky Doorway	Akupara Games	August 10, 2021	
The Darkside Detective: A Fumble in the Dark	Spooky Doorway	Akupara Games	August 10, 2021	
D/Generation	West Coast Software	West Coast Software	April 30, 2021	
Danger Scavenger	Piotr Wolk, Star Drifters	Star Drifters, Doyoyo Games	January 19, 2021	
Dare Devil	Lewis Hill	MuddyVision, AtariAge	September 8, 2023	Atari 2600
Dark Cavern	Mattel	Atari, Inc / M Network	May 24, 2024	Atari 2600
Days of Doom	SneakyBox	Atari, Inc.	September 21, 2023	
Desert Falcon	Atari, Inc.	Atari, Inc.	October 15, 2021	Atari 7800
Dogfight	Vektor Grafix	MicroProse, Atari, Inc.	January 28, 2022	DOSBox
Donut Dodo	pixel.games	pixel.games	June 3, 2022	
Dragon's Cache	Todd Furmanski	AtariAge	December 29, 2023	Atari 7800
Dragon's Descent	Todd Furmanski	AtariAge	December 29, 2023	Atari 7800
Dragon's Havoc	Todd Furmanski	AtariAge	December 29, 2023	Atari 7800
Doodle Taxi	Metgan Games	Metgan Games	May 26, 2023	
Dynablaster	BBG Entertainment	BBG Entertainment	September 14, 2023	
El Panadero - The Baker	Sketchy Ceviche	Sketchy Ceviche	October 4, 2024	
End's Reach	Cuirass Entertainment	Cuirass Entertainment	July 28, 2023	
Escape from PoPo	Metgan Games	Metgan Games	April 26, 2023	
E.X.O. 7800	MuddyVision	MuddyVision	October 13, 2023	
Failsafe	Bob DeCrescenzo	Bob DeCrescenzo	June 27. 2023	Atari 7800
Fast Break	Accolade	Accolade	March 15, 2022	DOSBox
Fatal Run	Atari, Inc.	Atari, Inc.	January 7, 2022	Atari 7800
Food Fight	General Computer Corporation	Atari, Inc.	November 19, 2021	Atari 7800
Food Fight: Culinary Combat	Mega Cat Studios	Atari, Inc.	December 15, 2023	
Frenzy	Bob DeCrescenzo	AtariAge	February 2, 2024	Atari 7800
Frog Hop	Tiny Warrior Games	Tiny Warrior Games	December 24, 2020	
Game Panic 3	John Hancock, Jason Santuci	John Hancock, Jason Santuci	October 14, 2023	
Gore Crush	Gigatank 3000	Gigatank 3000	October 31, 2024	
The Gem Collector	TreeFall Studios L.L.C.	TreeFall Studios L.L.C.	September 19, 2023	
Gravitar	Atari, Inc.	Atari, Inc.	March 18, 2022	Atari 2600
Gravitar: Recharged	Adamvision Studios, SneakyBox	Atari, Inc.	May 11, 2022	
Groundskeeper 2	Orangepixel	Orangepixel	May 19, 2023	
Gunslugs	Orangepixel	Orangepixel	December 16, 2022	
Gunslugs 2	Orangepixel	Orangepixel	March 23, 2023	
Guntech	Jani Penttinen	Utopos Games	December 11, 2020	
Guntech 2	Jani Penttinen	Utopos Games	March 23, 2022	
Harpy's Curse	Todd Furmanski	AtariAge	January 5, 2024	Atari 7800
Harrier Jump Jet	MicroProse	Atari, Inc.	February 11, 2022	DOSbox
Haunted House	Orbit Studio	Atari, Inc.	October 12, 2023	2023 edition
Haunted House - TRICKORTREAT Redeem Code	Atari, Inc.	Atari, Inc.	October 26, 2023	Atari 2600
Heroes of Loot	Orangepixel	Orangepixel	October 28, 2022	
Heroes of Loot 2	Orangepixel	Orangepixel	April 21, 2023	
Jetboard Joust	BitBull Ltd	Freedom Games	May 18, 2021	
Kombinera	Graphite Lab, Joystick	Atari, Inc.	April 7, 2022	
Lunar Lander Beyond	Dreams Uncorporated	Atari, Inc.	April 23, 2024	
Mad Age & This Guy	Atomic Wolf	Atomic Wolf	December 11, 2020	
Madness Beverage	Blue Sunset Games	Console Labs S.A.	December 20, 2023	
Meganoid	Orangepixel	Orangepixel	August 5, 2022	
Metgan's Multiball	Metgan Games	Metgan Games	June 21. 2024	
Metgan's Traffic Mission	Metgan Games	Metgan Games	June 9, 2023	
Micro Prose Soccer	MicroProse, Sensible Software	Ziggurat	April 1, 2022	
Mighty Math	TreeFall Studios L.L.C.	TreeFall Studios L.L.C.	January, 26 2024	
Milli & Greg	2ndBoss	2ndBoss	December 1, 2023	
Missile Command: Recharged	Adamvision Studios, SneakyBox	Atari, Inc.	December 11, 2020	2020 version
Missile Command: Recharged	Adamvision Studios, SneakyBox	Atari, Inc.	October 29, 2022	2022 version
Montezuma's Revenge	Normal Distribution LLC	Normal Distribution LLC	October 27, 2023	Retro and Modern version
Motor Psycho	BlueSky Software	Atari, Inc.	November 5, 2021	Atari 7800
Mr. Run and Jump	Graphite Lab, Heavy Horse Games	Atari, Inc.	July 25, 2023	
Mr. Run and Jump 2600	Atari, Inc.	Atari, Inc.	June 14, 2024	Atari 2600
Mutazione	Die Gute Fabrik	Akupara Games	December 11, 2020	
Neosprint	Headless Chicken Games	Headless Chicken Games	October 6, 2023	
Ninja Golf	BlueSky Software	Atari, Inc.	October 22, 2021	Atari 7800
Off-World Rally	Cuirass Entertainment	Cuirass Entertainment	July 26, 2024	
A Path to the Princess	Metgan Games	Metgan Games	February 24, 2023	
Pedra!	Tucasoft (Ian Weeks)	Tucasoft (Ian Weeks)	October 26, 2021	
Pixel Cup Soccer	BATOVI Games Studio	BATOVI Games Studio	June 11, 2021	
Planet Smashers	Atari, Inc.	Atari, Inc.	November 12, 2021	Atari 7800
Planetary Defense Force	Blue Sunset Games	Blue Sunset Games	September 29, 2023	
PolyGunr	RetroNinja	RetroNinja	January 19, 2024	Free Demo
Popcorn Rocket	Battle Geek Plus, LLC	Battle Geek Plus, LLC	July 12, 2024	
The Perplexing Orb Bounce N Roll	TreeFall Studios L.L.C.	TreeFall Studios L.L.C.	December 22, 2023	
Puzzledorf	Stuart's Pixel Games	Stuart's Pixel Games	August 4, 2023	
Qomp2	Graphite Lab	Atari, Inc.	February 20, 2024	
Quantum: Recharged	SneakyBox	Atari, Inc.	August 17, 2023	
Rally Racers	West Coast Games Ltd	West Coast Games Ltd	January 28, 2022	
Real Sports Baseball	Atari, Inc.	Atari, Inc.	January 21, 2022	Atari 7800
Retro Game Quest	Gemintronic	John Hancock, Jason Santuci	June 16, 2023	Atari 2600
Roasty Buds: Special Brew	Abstract Polygon	Abstract Polygon	November 22, 2024	
Residual	Orangepixel	Orangepixel	February 17, 2023	
Saboteur	Howard Scott Warshaw	Atari, Inc.	August 26, 2022	Atari XP Release
Savage Halloween	2ndBoss	2ndBoss	October 20, 2023	
Scrapyard Dog	BlueSky Software	Atari, Inc.	October 22, 2021	Atari 7800
Sentinels of Atlantis	Michael Greenhut	Michael Greenhut	September 27, 2024	
Sigi - A Fart for Melusina	pixel.games	pixel.games	December 11, 2020	
Simple Light Cycles	Kelsam	Kelsam	September 26, 2023	
Sir Lovelot	pixel.games	pixel.games	December 24, 2020	
Skinny and Franko: Fists of Violence	Blue Sunset Games	Blue Sunset Games	April 28, 2023	
Sky Frizz	Liminalist	Liminalist	August 16, 2024	
Snake Core	Orangepixel	Orangepixel	March 1, 2024	
Something Ate My Alien	Rokabium Games	Rokabium Games	January 8, 2021	
Space Duel	Bob DeCrescenzo	AtariAge	March 22, 2024	Atari 7800
Space Grunts	Orangepixel	Orangepixel	September 15, 2022	
Spear Master	Osarion	Osarion	December 11, 2020	
Spirit of the Samurai	Digital Mind S.L.	Kwalee	February 20, 2026	
Stardash	Orangepixel	Orangepixel	November 17, 2023	
Strike Zone: 2600	Edward Smith, Kevin Mosley	Edward Smith, Kevin Mosley	October 14, 2023	
Super 3D Maze 16 Demo	JD Video Game Productions	JD Video Game Productions	July 1, 2024	Free
Super 3D Maze 16	JD Video Game Productions	JD Video Game Productions	October 11, 2024	
Super Huey	Cosmi Corporation	Atari, Inc.	December 3, 2021	Atari 7800
SuperMash	Digital Continue	Digital Continue	January 8, 2021	
Super Star Shooter 16	JD Video Game Productions	JD Video Game Productions	October 6, 2023	
Sydney Hunter and the Curse of the Mayan	CollectorVision Games	CollectorVision Games	November 18, 2021	
Tanks, But No Tanks	Set Sail Games	Set Sail Games	April 12, 2024	
Tailgunner	Grizzly Machine	Grizzly Machine	February 11, 2021	No longer available (5/12/23)
Tempest 4000	Llamasoft Ltd.	Atari, Inc.	February 22, 2022	
The Perplexing Orb: Bounce Challenge	TreeFall Studios L.L.C.	TreeFall Studios L.L.C.	November 27, 2024	
Tile Cross	Set Sail Games	Set Sail Games	April 12, 2024	
Thrustlander	Improbable Pixel	Improbable Pixel	December 24, 2020	
Tilting Tiles	TreeFall Studios L.L.C.	TreeFall Studios L.L.C.	August 25, 2023	
Tilting Tiles: Fires of Industry	TreeFall Studios L.L.C.	TreeFall Studios L.L.C.	November 27, 2024	
Tilting Tiles Ultimate Tilt Remix	TreeFall Studios L.L.C.	TreeFall Studios L.L.C.	August 23, 2024	
Timeline Mission	Metgan Games	Metgan Games	January 26, 2024	
Tiny Hands Adventure	Blue Sunset Games	Blue Sunset Games	September 20, 2024	
Tower of Rubble 2600	Dionoid	AtariAge	June 2, 2023	
Turnament	Philipp Lehner	Philipp Lehner	July 7, 2023	
Tyre Trax	Lewis HIll	MuddyVision, AtariAge	September 8, 2023	Atari 2600
Ultimate Ski Jumping	Blue Sunset Games	Forever Entertainment S.A.	September 1, 2023	
Ultra Mission	Gumbo Machine, LLC	Gumbo Machine, LLC	October 9, 2023	
Unsung Warriors – Prologue	Osarion, Mountaineer	Osarion, Mountaineer	December 11, 2020	
Utopos	Jani Penttinen	Utopos Games	April 7, 2021	
Wild Dogs	2ndBoss	2ndBoss	January 19, 2024	
Wyvia	Blast Programming	Gigatank 3000	November 29, 2024	
Yars: Recharged	Adamvision Studios, SneakyBox	Atari, Inc.	August 23, 2022	
Yars' Return	Curt Vendel, Dennis Debro	Atari, Inc.	August 26, 2022	Atari XP release
Yars Rising	WayForward	Atari	September 10, 2024	
ZPH: The Game	L. Camara	L. Camara	October 14, 2023	

== Cloud gaming services ==
The Atari VCS includes modern and retro cloud game gaming services. These apps can be downloaded from the Atari VCS store:

- Antstream Arcade
- Amazon Luna
- GeForce Now
- Xbox Cloud Gaming
