= List of Atari XEGS games =

This is a list of video games for Atari 8-bit computers published by Atari Corporation following the 1987 release of the Atari XEGS, the final model in the 8-bit computer line. The games are all on ROM cartridge and have XEGS-styled packaging. Many are re-releases of earlier floppy disk-based games from third party developers converted to cartridge format.

33 games are listed here. (Note: This number is always up to date by this script.)

== Games ==
Title	Genre(s)	Developer(s)	Release date(s)
Ace of Aces	Combat flight simulation	Distinctive Software	March 1989
Airball	Puzzle	The Softworks Factory	1988
Archon: The Light and the Dark	Strategy / action	Free Fall Associates	1987
Ballblazer	Sports	Lucasfilm Games	December 1987
Barnyard Blaster	Light gun shooter	K-Byte	December 1987
Battlezone	Combat simulation	Atari Corporation	January 1988
Blue Max	Scrolling shooter	Sculptured Software	December 1987
Bug Hunt	Light gun shooter	Atari Corporation	October 1987
Choplifter	Scrolling shooter	Sculptured Software	1988
Crime Buster	Light gun shooter	Atari Corporation	1988
Crossbow	Light gun shooter	Sculptured Software	April 1989
Crystal Castles	Maze	The Softworks Factory	1988
Dark Chambers	Dungeon crawl	Sculptured Software	April 1989
David's Midnight Magic	Pinball	Broderbund	December 1987
Desert Falcon	Scrolling shooter	Atari Corporation	1988
Donkey Kong	Platform	Atari Corporation	1988
Eastern Front (1941)	Turn-based strategy	Chris Crawford	1988
Fight Night	Sports	Sculptured Software	March 1988
Flight Simulator II	Flight simulation	Sublogic	October 1987
Food Fight	Action	The Softworks Factory	March 1989
GATO	Submarine simulation	Xanth F/X	April 1988
HardBall!	Sports	Sculptured Software	December 1987
Into the Eagle's Nest	Stealth	Pandora Software	May 1989
Karateka	Fighting	Sculptured Software	1988
Lode Runner	Puzzle-platform	Broderbund	1987
Mario Bros.	Platform	Sculptured Software	1988
Missile Command (Note: Pack-in title. Built into the system)	Action	Atari Corporation	October 1987
Necromancer	Action	Bill Williams	March 1989
One-on-One Basketball	Sports	Sculptured Software	March 1988
Rescue on Fractalus!	First-person shooter	Lucasfilm Games	December 1987
Star Raiders II	Space combat simulation	Atari Corporation	December 1987
Summer Games	Sports	Epyx	1988
Thunderfox	Scrolling shooter	Aztec Design	1988
