= Sentinel (1990 video game) =

1990 video game

- Cover art for Atari 7800 cartridge
- Developer: Imagineering
- Publisher: Atari
- Programmer: David Lubar
- Platforms: Atari 2600; Atari 7800
- Release: EU: 1990; US: 1990; CA: 1990 (2600); EU: 1991 (7800)
- Genre: Shoot 'em up
- Modes: Single-player, multiplayer

Comparison of the Atari 2600 (top) and Atari 7800 (bottom) versions of Sentinel

Sentinel is a 1990 video game developed by Imagineering and published by Atari for the Atari 2600. It is the only light gun game ever released for the Atari 2600 platform. It was re-released with improved graphics for the Atari 7800 in 1991.

== Development ==
The game was created by David Lubar of Imagineering. It uses the XE light gun, an accessory for the 2600 and 7800 platforms. The game is one of two light gun games for the Atari 2600, however the other, called simply Shooting Arcade, was never released. The game was launched in Europe in the PAL format, and in the NTSC format in the US and Canada by ResQsoft.

A version of the game for the Atari 7800 platform with improved graphics was developed and released in Europe only in 1991. As such, Sentinel is the final official European release for the Atari 7800 platform.

== Story ==
The player takes control of a scientist piloting a glowing orb they invented named the Sentinel, which can absorb and store energy. When aliens invade Earth, the scientist journeys in the Sentinel to four alien planets – Alptaurus, Ceruptus, Vulnavium, and Asceptron – to destroy their power stations, each guarded by an alien lord. Upon destroying these four worlds, the scientist encounters the entity who controlled the alien lords and defeats it.

== Gameplay ==
The game is similar to the arcade game Crossbow in that the player uses the light gun to shoot enemy targets in order to protect the Sentinel orb hovering above the surface of a planet. Four different planets are included in the game, each of increasing difficulty. The game features smart bombs that are triggered by shooting the orb. Some of the enemies can fire missiles, but the player may also destroy these missiles by shooting them. The game has three difficulty settings.

== Reception ==
A May 2004 review of the Atari 2600 version by the Video Games Critic website was overwhelmingly negative with a score of "F". The graphics were described as "uninspired" and the gameplay as "long and boring". The website reviewed the 7800 version in the same month, similarly concluding that the game was "a complete dud" with an "F" score.

In the Classic Home Video Games book series, author Brett Weiss called the game, "redundant and boring, making it more of a novelty item than a playable title". He compared it to Crossbow, but called Sentinel "not as good or as well known as that arcade classic".

== See also ==
- List of Atari 2600 games
- List of Atari 7800 games
