= Lucy Gilbert =

American programmer and video game developer

- Born: 1960; Tennessee
- Occupation(s): Programmer; Video game developer
- Known for: Computer graphics

Lucy Gilbert is an American programmer and video game developer. She worked for Atari, Inc. via General Computer Corporation and developed computer graphics software for Autographix.

== Education ==
Gilbert went to MIT and graduated with two degrees. Her master's thesis was about distributed computing using Ada.

== Career ==
Gilbert was hired by General Computer Corporation (GCC) right out of college in 1983. There she became interested in computer graphics. She was let go a year later and hired by Autographix, where she went on font rendering, as well as a large-scale presentation system for multiple screens.

In 1986, while working for Autographix, Gilbert co-authored the paper Limitations of Synchronous Communication with Static Process Structure in Languages for Distributed Computing. The paper explores the idea of a programming language for distributed programs, using a specific combination of communication principles and process structures. It suggests using either synchronous communication or a static process structure, but not both, in order to improve concurrency.

Gilbert was laid off after having her second child, but returned to work in 2008 with her own web design company.

== Personal life ==
Gilbert has six children, all of them working in or being educated in subjects related to STEM.
