= Froggo =

Defunct video game developer and publisher

Froggo, Inc.
- Type: Corporation
- Industry: Video games
- Founded: 1987
- Defunct: 1989
- Headquarters: 479 Macara Avenue, Sunnyvale, CA 94086, United States

Froggo Games was a video game company that published games for the Atari 2600 and Atari 7800.

== History ==
Froggo Games incorporated in 1987 when the Atari 2600 and Atari 7800 were no longer popular systems, years after the release of the Nintendo Entertainment System. Most of their games were copies of releases from other companies, and they had a reputation for extremely poor quality. Four of the ten games on the Digital Press list of the worst Atari 2600 games are from Froggo.

Froggo announced four new titles for the 7800 in the 1989 May/June issue of Atarian magazine: UFO, Pyromania, Night of the Ninja, and Scorpion Squad. The company went out of business soon after, and the games were never released.

== Games ==
- Sea Hawk (1983, 1987)
- Spiderdroid (1987)
- Tank Command (1988)
- Water Ski (1988)
- Cruise Missile
- Karate (1982,1988)
- Sea Hunt (1978,1988)
