= Karate (1982 video game) =

- Developer: Ultravision
- Publishers: Ultravision; Froggo (re-release)
- Designer: Joseph Amelio
- Platform: Atari 2600
- Release: 1982
- Genre: Fighting
- Modes: Single-player, multiplayer

Karate on the Atari 2600

Karate is a video game for the Atari 2600 originally published by Ultravision in 1982 for NTSC systems, then re-released in the latter half of the 1980s by Froggo. Supposedly the game was designed by black belt Joseph Amelio. In 1991, Digital Press chose Karate as one of the worst Atari 2600 games of all time.
