= Atari XG-1 light gun =

Video game light gun accessory

Atari XG-1
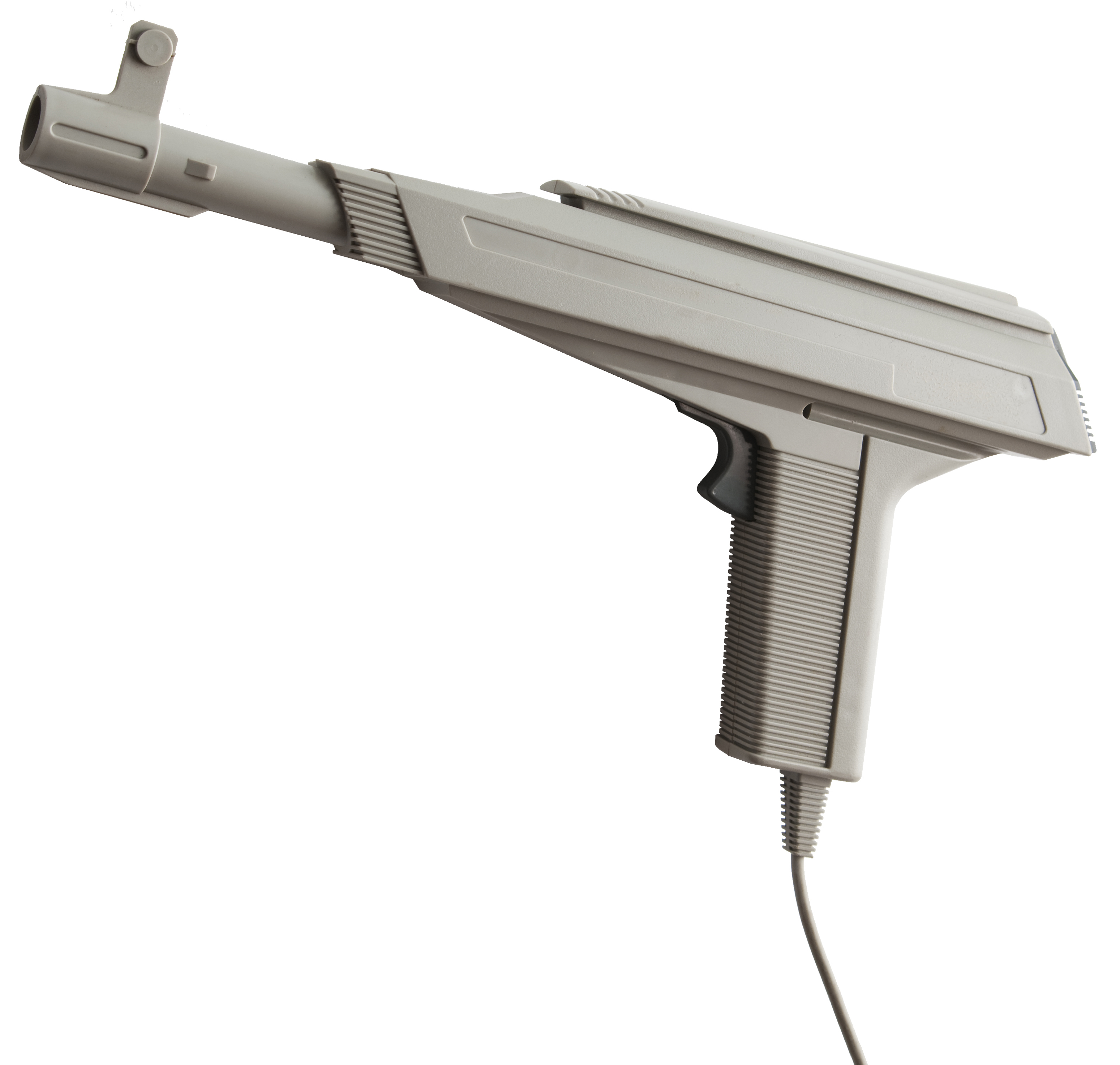
- Developer: Atari Corporation
- Manufacturer: Atari Corporation
- Type: Light gun
- Generation: Second and third (8-bit era)
- Released: 1987; 39 years ago
- Introductory price: $34.95
- Input: Light pen
- Best-selling game: Bug Hunt
- Backward compatibility: Atari 8-bit, Atari 7800, Atari 2600

The Atari XG-1 is an electronic light gun accessory manufactured by Atari Corporation. Released in 1987, it is compatible with the Atari 8-bit computers, Atari 7800, and Atari 2600. It was bundled with the Atari XEGS Deluxe home computer and video game console combination system, and with the light gun game Bug Hunt for the 7800 as model XES2001 for US$34.95 (equivalent to about $100 in 2025). Atari eventually released five light gun games on the 7800 (Alien Brigade, Barnyard Blaster, Crossbow, Meltdown, and Sentinel) and one on the 2600 (Sentinel).

== Hardware ==
The XG-1 is a specialized light pen. Generic light pen support was built into the Atari 8-bit home computers since its 1979 launch. The Atari 400/800 Hardware Technical Reference recommends a calibration procedure each time a light pen is used, so that the software can compensate for this offset for maximal accuracy. Bug Hunt and Barnyard Blaster for the XEGS each have unique hard-coded values. A reddish-orange version of the gun was planned for the 2600 and 7800 but was never released.

== Games ==
Sentinel is the only game released for the gun on the 2600 console. Shooting Arcade was planned but never released.

XG-1 light gun games
Year	Title	Platforms
1987	Bug Hunt	XEGS
1987	Crossbow	7800 and XEGS
1988	Barnyard Blaster	7800 and XEGS
1990	Alien Brigade	7800
1988	Crime Buster	XEGS
1990	Meltdown	7800
1992	Operation Blood	XEGS
1993	Operation Blood II – Special Forces	XEGS
1987	Gangsterville	XEGS
1990	Sentinel	2600 and 7800
Unreleased	Shooting Gallery	2600

== Reception ==
For Antic magazine in August 1988, Matthew Ratcliff criticized the poor horizontal accuracy of the XG-1 light gun compared to Nintendo's NES Zapper or Sega's Light Phaser. In December 1988, he said that, to switch between light gun and joystick games, active XEGS gamers are frustrated by the need to continually re-plug their devices and power cycle the system, due to the system's lack of autodetection, which is complicated by its awkwardly downward slanting ports. He said "Barnyard Blaster and Bug Hunt could have been just a bit smarter" by including the simple routine that the magazine was forced to write and publish as a workaround.

In the August 1989 issue of A.N.A.L.O.G. Computing magazine, Matthew Ratcliff wrote a front page feature on programming the XG-1 in users' custom software, including his program allowing the light gun to be used to make menu selections. He gave the XG-1 a positive review, calling it an "exciting alternative to joysticks". He said it "has much more 'noise' in the horizontal direction than vertical" due to hardware limitations.

The 2014 book Vintage Game Consoles also criticized its accuracy compared to its competition, but noted its rarity as Atari's only light gun.

== See also ==
- Atari 8-bit computer peripherals
