= Crack'ed =

1988 video game

- Developer: Atari Corporation
- Publisher: Atari Corporation
- Designer: Robert Neve
- Platforms: Atari ST, Atari 7800
- Release: 1988
- Genre: Action

Crack'ed, subtitled "An Egg-Citing Adventure", is target shooting video game developed by Robert Craig (credited as Robert Neve) for the Atari ST and released by Atari Corporation in 1988. An Atari 7800 port was published the same year. In Crack'ed the player must protect bird eggs by shooting predators. An aiming crosshair is controlled with the mouse on the ST version and the standard controller for the 7800. The Atari XG-1 light gun is not supported.

An Atari 2600 version was in development, but never released.

== Gameplay ==
The goal of Crack'ed is to protect the eggs in five nests during an attack by egg-stealing creatures. The controls are similar to that of light-gun games, except the ST mouse is used to position the crosshairs and the left mouse button shoots. On the 7800, the joystick is used instead of the mouse.

If a creature carries off an egg, the creature can be shot so it drops its prize. The falling egg can be caught with the crosshairs and placed back in a nest. If at the end of the raid at least one egg remains in a nest, then the level ends. There are five differently themed levels.

== Development ==
In a 2003 interview, Robert Craig stated he was against the release of console ports, as Crack'ed was designed as a "mouse game."

== Reception ==
In the August 1988 issue of ST Action magazine, the Atari ST version of Crack'ed received a 58% rating.

=== Retrospective ===
Atari 7800 Forever scored a 2 out of 5, criticizing the stiff controls but praising the original idea for the game.

After playing the unreleased Atari 2600 prototype, a writer for AtariProtos commented, "While it may have been a mediocre title for the 7800, Crack'ed actually made a decent 2600 game."
