= Plutos =

1987 video game

- Developer(s): Tynesoft
- Publisher(s): Micro Value
- Designer(s): Derek Johnston
- Platform(s): Amiga, Atari ST
- Release: 1987
- Genre(s): Scrolling shooter
- Mode(s): Single-player

Plutos is a vertically scrolling shooter developed by Tynesoft and published by Micro Value in 1987. The game was released for the Amiga and Atari ST, and was a heavily inspired by the 1984 arcade game Star Force. In 1991, the game was re-issued on Prism Leisure's "16-Bit Pocket Power" imprint.

== Reception ==
Although warning that the ST already had "scrolling shoot-em-up" games, David Plotkin of STart in 1987 liked Plutos's graphics and level design, concluding that "this is an entertaining way to work off your aggressions".
