= One on One: Dr. J vs. Larry Bird =

1983 video game

- Developer: Electronic Arts
- Publisher: Electronic Arts: EU: Ariolasoft; Atari Corporation (7800)
- Designer: Eric Hammond
- Platforms: Apple II, Amiga, Atari 7800, Atari 8-bit, ColecoVision, Commodore 64, IBM PC, Classic Mac OS, TRS-80 Color Computer
- Release: 1983: Apple II; 1984: Atari 8-bit, C64, IBM PC; 1985: CoCo, Mac, Spectrum; 1986: Amiga; 1987: Atari 7800
- Genre: Sports (basketball)
- Modes: Single-player, multiplayer

One on One: Dr. J vs. Larry Bird, commonly known as One on One, is a basketball video game written by Eric Hammond for the Apple II and published by Electronic Arts in 1983. It was initially ported to the Atari 8-bit computers, ColecoVision, Commodore 64, and IBM PC compatibles (as a self-booting disk). Versions followed for the TRS-80 Color Computer, Classic Mac OS, Amiga, and ZX Spectrum. In Europe, the publisher was Ariolasoft. Atari Corporation released an Atari 7800 port in 1987.

== Gameplay ==
The player controls basketball star Julius Erving or Larry Bird in a game of one-on-one against another player or the computer. It allows for play to a certain score or timed games. The game includes personal fouls, a 24-second shot clock, jumpers, fadeaways, putbacks, and what is likely the first instant replay in sports video games (the March 1983 non-sports arcade game Food Fight also has instant replay).

On offense, a player can spin or shoot; on defense, attempt to block or steal the ball, with over aggressiveness penalized by fouls. A hard dunk can shatter the backboard, prompting a janitor to come out and sweep up the shards, directing censored complaints at the player in the process.

Scott Joplin's "Maple Leaf Rag" is the title screen soundtrack.

== Development ==
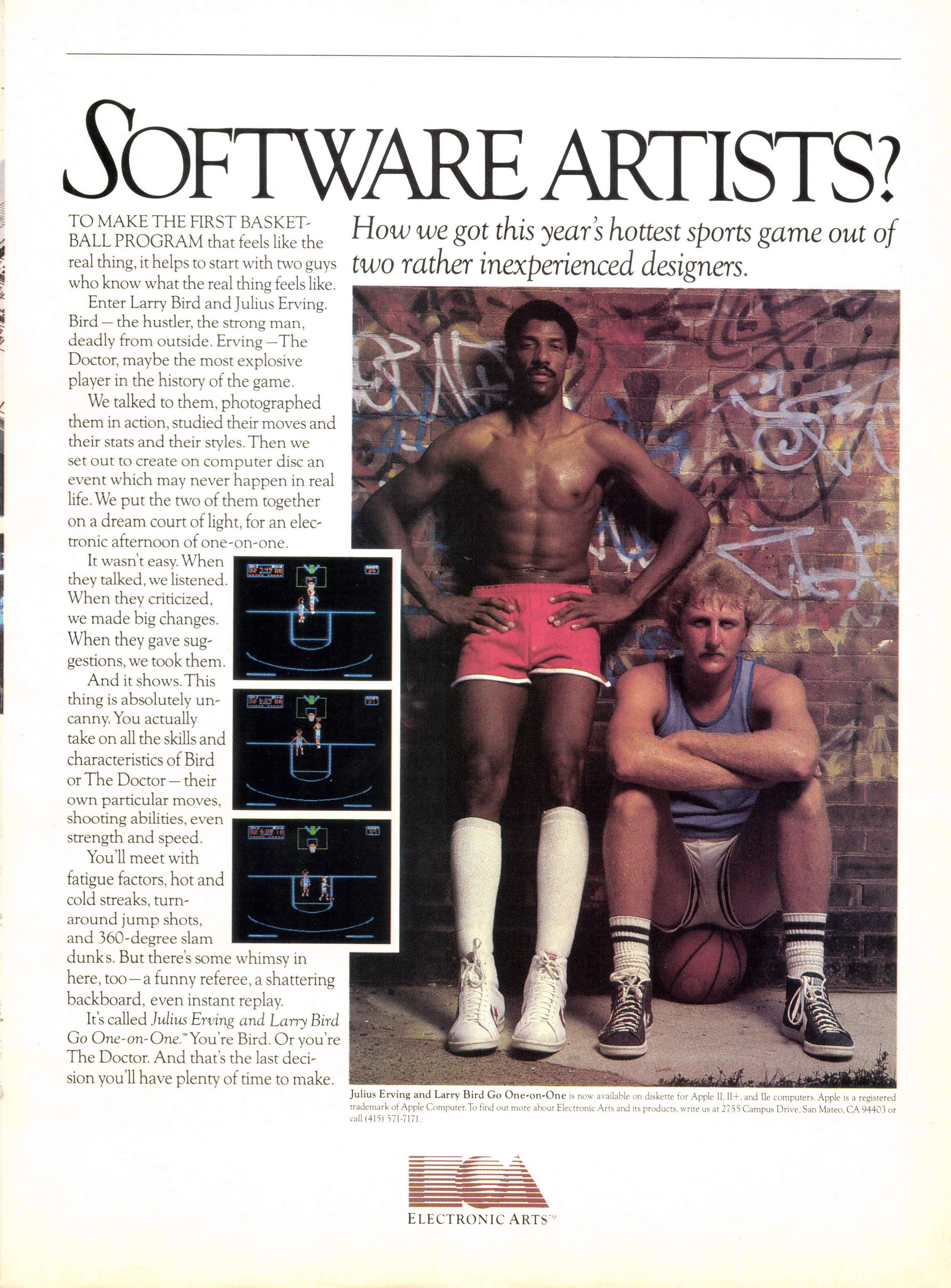
Magazine advertisement

The game was developed while Trip Hawkins was unsuccessfully attempting to develop a video game based on American football (an effort which eventually led to the creation of the Madden NFL series). Influenced by a televised one-on-one basketball tournament he remembered watching when he was younger, Hawkins decided to create a game based on the concept. He signed Julius Erving, his favorite basketball player at the time. Erving went to Electronic Arts headquarters for principal photography and to offer advice to the developers. Erving and Bird were each paid $25,000 to appear in the game, along with a 2.5 percent royalty. In addition, Erving received some stock in Electronic Arts.

The game's simpler half-court set-up allowed the team to focus on adding more realism, including more accurate physics and animations. A planned feature that would have made Bird and Erving play more similarly to their real-life counterparts did not make the final game.

The cover photograph for the game's record-style package, was taken while Erving and Bird were visiting the Naismith Basketball Hall of Fame. The crowd sounds heard in the Amiga version were recorded by Hawkins and producer Joe Ybarra at a Golden State Warriors game.

== Reception ==
One on One was successful, helping EA avoid financial difficulty and increasing retailers' familiarity with the company. In 1984 ST.Game's readers named the game the eighth most-popular Apple program of 1983. It was also awarded Electronic Game of the Year by the 1985 Arkie Awards, presented by Electronic Games Magazine. One on One was Electronic Arts' best-selling game, and second best-selling Commodore 64 game, as of late 1987. It was certified "SPA Platinum" (sales of 250,000 copies) by November 1989, after having sold 400,000 copies by late 1988 and becoming the highest-selling sports game ever for computers.

InfoWorld in 1984 called One on One "perhaps the most talked-about sports game of the new year". The magazine praised its portrayal of the two players' individual styles, backboard shattering, crowd noise, and instant replay, concluded that "One On One delivers the goods: a realistic simulation of a lively sports matchup". InfoWorld's Essential Guide to Atari Computers recommended the game to "born competitor[s]". Computer Gaming World in 1984 called One on One "incredibly realistic" and predicted that it would be one of the year's best sports games. The magazine cited the "absolutely fantastic" graphics, simple controls, and the instant replay as positives, only criticizing the lack of clarity of ball possession under the basket and lack of overtime. ST.Game said that "this is the sports game of 1984", noting the realistic feel of the two players' playing styles. While noting the inability to stop dribbling to fake out the other player, the magazine concluded that "highly addictive, thrilling, sometimes frustrating, and always involving are ways to describe One-on-One. It's a winner". Ahoy! in 1986 called the Commodore 64 version "a must-have", praising its graphics and gameplay. Compute! in 1986 approved of the Amiga version's improved graphics and sound but noted that the gameplay was the same as on 8-bit computers, stating that this was "a testament to careful research and clever programming" of the original version.

== Legacy ==
The original One on One helped establish Electronic Arts as a successful developer and publisher. It also foreshadowed how important sports titles would be to the company's future. EA Sports would later be spun off into its own division.

The sequel, Jordan vs Bird, was published in 1988 with improved graphics, Michael Jordan taking Dr. J's place, a slam dunk contest with Jordan, and a three-point shootout with Bird.
