= Motor Psycho =

1990 video game

- Box art
- Developer: BlueSky Software
- Publisher: Atari Corporation
- Platform: Atari 7800
- Release: 1990
- Genre: Racing
- Mode: Single-player

Motor Psycho is a motorcycle racing video game for the Atari 7800 developed by BlueSky Software and published by Atari Corporation in 1990. The title is a pun on motorcycle and psycho.

== Gameplay ==
In the game, the player controls a motorcyclist who races across courses within a time limit while avoiding obstacles and other motorcyclists, in a manner similar to Pole Position. Ramps are available for the player to jump over obstacles. Unlike similar games, there is no brake system to control the motorcycle's speed, though a high/low gear system is available. Players can adjust their response times before races to compensate for the lack of brakes.

== Reception ==
Raze gave the game a 81% score, praising its graphics, gameplay and high difficulty, though criticism was levied at its sound and lack of variety. Atari Explorer praised the game for its tight gameplay and realistic simulation of motorcycles, noting it to be superior to Pole Position II.
