= Gunslugs =

2013 video game

- Developer: OrangePixel
- Publisher: OrangePixel
- Platforms: iOS; Android; Ouya; PlayStation Vita; Microsoft Windows; OS X; Linux; Nintendo 3DS; Nintendo Switch; Atari VCS
- Release: 17 January 2013: iOS, Android 17 January 2013 Ouya 28 March 2013 PlayStation Vita; NA: 18 February 2014; PAL: 19 February 2014 Windows, OS X, Linux 2 June 2015 3DS 16 June 2016 Switch 3 November 2020 Atari VCS 16 December 2022
- Genres: Action; 2D shooter
- Mode: Single-player

Gunslugs is an action and 2D shooter video game. It was released by Dutch developer OrangePixel in 2013 for iOS, Android and Ouya, in 2014 for PlayStation Vita, in 2015 for Microsoft Windows, OS X, and Linux, in 2016 for Nintendo 3DS, and in 2020 for Nintendo Switch. In 2022 it was released for Atari VCS.

== Synopsis ==
The storyline of Gunslugs follows the adventures of a group of slugs who are attempting to find more information about the mysterious Black Duck army, and what their goals are. The army is waging war, and it's the players job to stop them.

== Gameplay ==
The game's graphics are pixelated and its audio and gameplay are very retro. The goal of the game to kill all of the enemies, and progress through the various levels as the player shoots enemies and crates and drops ammo pickups, and different weapons, such as flamethrowers, egg guns, and dual-wielding pistols of which the player uses to shoot in front of or behind them.

== Reception ==
Reception

Aggregate score
Aggregator	Score
Metacritic	(Vita) 81/100 (iOS) 80/100 (3DS, NS) 70/100

Review scores
Publication	Score
Destructoid	(Vita) 7.5/10
Gamezebo	(iOS) 4.5/5
Nintendo Life	(3DS) 7/10
Pocket Gamer	(iOS) 4/5
Push Square	(Vita) 8/10
Retro Gamer	(iOS) 72%
TouchArcade	(NS) 3.5/5

The iOS and PlayStation Vita versions received "generally favourable reviews", while the 3DS and Switch versions received "mixed or average reviews", according to the review aggregation website Metacritic.

The iOS version had moderate sales, with the creator reporting 10,811 sales within the first 9 weeks of launch, and an additional 150,000 downloads of a free version.
