= Basketbrawl =

1990 video game

- Atari 7800 box art
- Developer: Atari Corporation
- Publisher: Atari Corporation
- Platforms: Atari 7800, Atari Lynx
- Release: 7800: NA: 1990; Lynx: NA: 1992; EU: 1992
- Genre: Sports
- Modes: Single-player, multiplayer

Basketbrawl is a 1990 sports video game developed and published by Atari Corporation for the Atari 7800. It was ported to the Atari Lynx in 1992. It is a basketball simulation which allows hitting and fighting with other players. The name is a portmanteau of basketball and brawl.

Atari released another sports/fighting combo for the Atari 7800 in 1990 as Ninja Golf. Both were in the final 11 games published by Atari for that system in 1990-91 before dropping support.

== Gameplay ==
The main objective in Basketbrawl is to become the baddest gang in town by winning the tournament known as "Basketbrawl". The tournament is composed of three separate games or levels against the opposing city gangs. The difficulty increases by adding stronger weapons and additional players to the other gang. The games are six minutes long and you win by outscoring your opponent, similar to real-life basketball. One major scoring change is that every basket is two points regardless of the shot's length. If time expires with the score tied, overtime will be the first team to score wins.

The game can be played by up to two players simultaneously, where the additional player plays as a teammate. When it comes to strategy there truly is none as the game acts as a free-for-all with the only goal being to outscore the other team. In terms of game controls, the user solely uses the A and B button.

Within the game there will be a plethora of objects that can assist the user in a variety of ways: increasing health, shooting, overall power, stamina, or speed. These boosts are labeled by milk, lightning bolt, fist, heart, and a sneaker. These boosts stay in effect for the whole six minute game and are erased after. Weapons also appear on the court, which gives this game its "brawl" aspect. These weapons can be used to injure opposing players by throwing it at them, including throwing the basketball itself. Once a player's health is depleted, he lies on the ground, with his body acting as an obstacle for players for the remainder of the game.

== Reception ==
In a 1992 review, Robert Jung gave the Lynx version a 4 out of 10, concluding that "Basketbrawl takes an idea loaded with potential, then removes most of the excitement by combining weak sports action and weak combat action."

In a non-contemporaneous review, Atari 7800 Forever gave Basketbrawl a 4 out of 5: "Although not a pure blooded sports game, Basketbrawl without question is the best sports title for the 7800."
