= Meltdown (1990 video game) =

1990 video game

- Developer(s): Atari Corporation
- Publisher(s): Atari Corporation
- Platform(s): Atari 7800
- Release: 1990
- Genre(s): Light gun shooter
- Mode(s): Single-player, multiplayer

Meltdown is a light gun shooter video game developed by Atari Corporation and published in 1990 for the Atari 7800. It is one of five 7800 games compatible with the Atari XG-1 light gun accessory.

== Gameplay ==
The object of the game is to protect the 20 nuclear reactor cores from sparkx. At the title screen, the player chooses one or two players and novice or expert difficulty.

The player must shoot the sparkx before they damage the reactor core. If the player misses, a barrier temporarily appears. A maximum of four barriers can appear at a time. Sparkx will bounce off of the barriers adding a defensive strategy to the game. Sometimes power ups will appear on screen called power crystals and bonus blocks. The playfield area eventually shrinks, constraining the shooting area. If the reactor survives at the end of the round, the player is assigned a password to continue progress later, or can shoot to continue to the next reactor.

The game ends when either the control rods are destroyed or if the player saves all 20 reactors.

== Plot ==
This game is set in a world where international terrorists have threatened to destroy the world. To accomplish this, the terrorists unleashed a weapon known as "sparkx" to attack 20 nuclear reactors. This weapon attacks the control rods of each reactor until forcing a nuclear meltdown. The player takes on the role of an unnamed hero tasked with destroying the sparkx within each reactor to save the world.

== Reception ==
GamePro gave Meltdown a score of 14/25 on release in October 1990, commenting that "it isn't the most glamorous game in the world, but the fun of using a light gun, along with the fast action, make up for it nicely". Writing for Retro Gamer, Kieren Hawken ranked Meltdown among the best games for the 7800, and in the top five 7800-exclusive games, saying that Meltdown "might not look like much, but the frantic shooting action will leave you sweating." Brett Weiss in the book Classic Home Video Games compared the game to Reactor and noted the temporary barrier system as an inventive idea. Andy Slaven in his book Video Game Bible called the gameplay, graphics, and sound "dull".
