= Midnight Mutants =

1990 video game

- Cover art by Michael Mendheim
- Developer: Radioactive Software
- Publisher: Atari Corporation
- Designer: Peter Adams
- Programmer: Peter Adams
- Artist: Les Pardew
- Writer: Tammy Moore
- Composer: Paul Webb.
- Platform: Atari 7800
- Release: NA: 1990
- Genre: Action-adventure
- Mode: Single-player

Midnight Mutants is an action-adventure game for the Atari 7800 ProSystem, developed by Radioactive Software and published by Atari Corporation in 1990. It features a likeness of Al Lewis, dressed as Grandpa Munster, playing the role of "Grampa". The game, along with Sentinel, was one of the last releases by Atari for the Atari 7800.

As with similar games of that era, Midnight Mutants features a large in-game environment with many locations, a background musical soundtrack, battles against boss enemies and an animated introduction.

== Plot ==
On Halloween night in 1992 young Jimmy Harkman's grandfather (known as "Grampa") has been imprisoned inside of a pumpkin by a resurrected villain named Dr. Evil, who is taking revenge for being burned at the stake as a witch by their ancestor Johnathon Harkman on Halloween night in 1747.

Jimmy then heads on a Halloween quest to free his grandfather. With Doctor Evil on the loose, Jimmy finds the countryside has become inhabited by scary creatures such as zombies and werewolves that can injure him physically and also make his blood impure. Fortunately, even though Grampa is trapped in pumpkin form, he is available to give Jimmy advice on occasion with the push of a button. Along the way, Jimmy can collect weapons and items that will help him in his quest to defeat evil creatures, giant bosses and ultimately Dr. Evil himself.

== Gameplay ==
Confronting the undead at the graveyard

Midnight Mutants is a scrolling action-adventure game with a horror theme. It is displayed from a pseudo-isometric viewpoint and features a completely free-roaming world design.

In his quest to save Grampa, Jimmy travels across the countryside, exploring an old haunted mansion, a secret laboratory, caverns, a haunted forest, a pumpkin patch, a haunted graveyard, an old shipwreck, among other locations.

Initially, Jimmy is powerless to fight the evil that faces him and must rely on his wits and grandpa's advice in order to stay alive. Contact with the creatures roaming about will either cause him physical injury or make his blood lose its purity, both of which will prove fatal if he's not careful. As the game progresses, he locates various weapons of increasing power, health power-ups and other useful items that make it possible to defeat the minions of evil. Key parts of the game culminate in battles against giant boss creatures that take up most of the screen.

== Development ==
Midnight Mutants was developed by Radioactive Software, a team consisting of programmer and designer Peter Adams; writer Tammy Moore; artist Les Pardew; and composer Paul Webb. Former Atari programmer Chuck Peavey told Retro Gamer that while he worked an unreleased 7800 adaptation of the 1984 film Missing in Action, his boss, Adams, was working on another game titled Grandpa's Attic, centered around Grandpa Munster from the sitcom The Munsters. Peavey alleged it was cancelled due to poor quality. The cover for Midnight Mutants, as well as its in-game graphics, feature actor Al Lewis as this character, whom he portrayed in the show. Neither the actor nor the show are credited or mentioned within the game or within its packaging. According to the Game Developers Research Institute, both this cover and that of the 1989 Nintendo Entertainment System game Fester's Quest were done by Michael Mendheim. Hidden in the code for Midnight Mutants is a secret, misspelled message stating, "IT'S A WONDER PETER EVER GOT THIS PROGRAM BEDUGGED!"

== Reception ==
In a retrospective review, Atari 7800 Forever gave the game a 4.5 out of 5, praising the humor, the approachable in-game menus and the excellent boss battles. IGN listed it as the third-best 7800 game, citing "some real longevity" due to its large map "as well as just solid exploration gameplay." Retro Gamer attributed its late release as the reason for being one of the most advanced games for the 7800, allowing it to rival its console contemporaries. It summarized, "This isometric arcade adventure has a spooky Halloween-based plot, which is told by an impressive animated intro, and a huge map that will have you playing right into the midnight hours."

== Reviews ==
- Digital Press - Classic Video Games
- The Video Game Critic
