= Planet Smashers =

1990 video game

- North American box art
- Developer: Datafast Computer Systems
- Publisher: Atari Corporation
- Programmer: James V. Zalewski
- Platform: Atari 7800
- Release: 1990
- Genre: Scrolling shooter
- Modes: Single-player, multiplayer

Planet Smashers is a 1990 vertically scrolling shooter video game developed by Datafast Computer Systems and published by Atari Corporation for the Atari 7800. Released late in the console's life cycle, it bears references to Atari's own Alien Brigade, which was developed concurrently.

== Gameplay ==
Players control a spaceship who must pass through seven levels to stop an alien invasion. The spaceship navigates through asteroids, which can be destroyed by shooting, while also defeating alien enemies on the way. There is no visible end to every level; players must seek out colored capsules and obtain them in a certain order in order to be able to warp to the end and fight the boss enemy. Power-ups such as temporary invincibility, repaired shield and better weapons are available.

== Reception ==
Raze magazine gave the game a 76/100 score, praising its fast-paced gameplay and simple but great graphics, but criticized its limited use of the console's sound capabilities. Atari Explorer praised the game's gameplay and excellent graphics, though the reviewer noted the gameplay was too fast-paced to its detriment.
