= Super Huey UH-IX =

1985 video game

- Publisher(s): Cosmi; Atari Corporation (7800); U.S. Gold
- Platform(s): Commodore 64, Amiga, Apple II, Atari ST, Atari 8-bit, MS-DOS, Atari 7800
- Release: 1985: C64; 1986: Apple II, Amiga, Atari 8-bit, Atari ST; 1988: MS-DOS; 1989: 7800
- Genre(s): Combat flight simulation

Super Huey UH-IX (simply Super Huey on some platforms) is a helicopter combat flight simulation game published by Cosmi Corporation. Originally released for the Commodore 64 in 1985, it was ported to the Amiga, Apple II, Atari ST, Atari 8-bit computers, and MS-DOS. Atari Corporation published an Atari 7800 version in 1989.

== Gameplay ==
Super Huey UH-IX is a game in which a flight simulator involves combat, as well as rescue and exploration missions.

== Reception ==
M. Evan Brooks reviewed the game for Computer Gaming World, and stated that "For those desiring an 8-bit helicopter flight simulator, Super Huey and its sequels fill the bill. For those desiring excitement as well, it would pay dividends to look elsewhere." Antic described Super Huey as a "true simulation" like Flight Simulator II, with excellent graphics.
