= Fight Night (1985 video game) =

- UK release
- Developer: Sydney Development
- Publishers: Accolade; U.S. Gold
- Platforms: Apple II, Atari 8-bit, Atari 7800, Commodore 64
- Release: 1985: Apple, Atari 8-bit, C64; 1987: Atari 8-bit cartridge 1988: 7800
- Genre: Sports (boxing)
- Modes: Single-player, multiplayer

Fight Night is a boxing video game developed by Sydney Development Corporation and published by Accolade in the United States and by U.S. Gold in the United Kingdom. It was initially released in 1985 for the Apple II, Atari 8-bit computers, and Commodore 64. The game includes both a single player mode and multiplayer mode. It includes the ability to customize the player's boxer. In total, there are five boxers to beat.

The Atari 8-bit version was republished on cartridge by Atari Corporation in 1987, after the release of the Atari XEGS. It was followed by an Atari 7800 port in 1988.

== Reception ==
Rick Teverbaugh reviewed the game for Computer Gaming World, and stated that "The game could have been much better. The graphics are good and it is possible to create your own characters and save them to disk for future use. My only question is why would you want to?"

Fight Night was Accolade's third best-selling Commodore game as of late 1987.

Antic described the Atari 8-bit version as "entertaining, frustrating and not just a bit silly (which is one of its strengths)". The magazine concluded that "Fight Night's primary function is to involve you and make you laugh, not to precisely mimic the action in a boxing ring. It de-brutalizes the sport, which is a point in its favor". Computer and Video Games rated the 7800 version 80% in 1989.
