= Barnyard Blaster =

1988 video game

- Publisher: Atari Corporation
- Programmer: James Zalewski
- Platforms: Atari 7800, Atari 8-bit
- Release: 1988
- Genre: Light-gun shooter

Barnyard Blaster is a light gun shooting video game written by James Zalewski and published by Atari Corporation for the Atari 7800 and Atari 8-bit computers in 1988. It is one of the few games compatible with the Atari XG-1 light gun.

== Plot ==
The player takes on the role of a farm hand. The player and their grandpa decide to invest their life savings into a farm. However, once settled in, both notice that several rodents, birds, and other critters are threatening the farm. It is up to the unnamed player to take out the critters.

== Gameplay ==
The goal of this game is to rid the farm of vermin by successfully hitting targets using the light gun in each of the game's three areas. These areas include, the barn, cornfield, and barnyard. The player must take out all enemies on screen by using less than 40 bullets. This forces the player to improve accuracy each round. If the player runs out of bullets before eliminating all critters, the game ends.

There is a fourth bonus area called "Gramp's bonus screen." This area allows players a chance to improve their shooting skill and earn extra points. This area is unlocked each time the player completes the other three areas successfully.

Players are assigned a rank based on how many screens were completed before the game ends. The rank ranges from "total dud" when zero screens are completed to "blaster" when a minimum of 33 screens are completed.

This game can be played either with 1 or 2 players.

== Reception ==
In a retrospective review, the Video Game Critic gave the Atari 7800 version of the game an F, calling it "the worst of the Atari 7800 light gun games."

== See also ==
- Crack'ed
