= Fatal Run =

1990 video game

- Developer: Sculptured Software
- Publisher: Atari Corporation
- Platforms: Atari 2600, Atari 7800
- Release: UK: 1990; EU: 1990
- Genre: Vehicular combat
- Mode: Single-player

Fatal Run on the Atari 2600

Fatal Run is a 1990 post-apocalyptic-themed vehicular combat game developed by Sculptured Software for the Atari 2600 and Atari 7800 and published by Atari Corporation. Along with Klax, this was the last game Atari officially released for the Atari 2600. At 32kB of data, the game was also the biggest ever released for the Atari 2600. The game was only released in Europe.

== Gameplay ==
The player is tasked with driving an anti-radiation vaccine through a post-apocalyptic wasteland. The game centres around destroying other cars that attempt to stop the player and avoiding obstacles. The game has 32 levels, each of which has a password meaning that progress could be saved. Depending on how quickly each level is finished, a number of onlookers at the end of each level will explode due to the late arrival of the vaccine. Various power-ups may be collected in each level, including additional weapons, deployable oil-slicks, nitro speed-boosts, and 'death crystals' which make the player's car immune to crash-damage when colliding with other cars. Money earned in each level can be spent on repairs and upgrades.

== Reception ==
A review in the March 1991 edition of GamePro was positive about the gameplay but neutral about the graphics, stating that "the scenery is incredibly boring". Reviewing the game for November/December 2000 issue of Atari 2600 Connection, Al Backiel criticised the lack of an end cut-scene for the Atari 2600 version, but praised the cut-scene of the 7800 version. Andy Slaven writing in the book Video Game Bible, 1985–2002 said of the game that "the first few minutes are great, but after that it just gets old".

Writing for the Daily Dot, Jean-Michael Bond included it a list of the 30 best Atari 2600 games ever. Brett Weiss in Classic Home Video Games, 1985–1988 A Complete Reference Guide praised the password-saving system and the cut-scenes. Writing in 2016, Retro Gamer magazine stated that the game was similar to RoadBlasters, and said "by far the most impressive part of this game ... are the cut-scenes...". Matthew Lippart reviewing the Atari 7800 version for the Atari HQ website criticised the controls, found the sound "bad" and the gameplay "repetitive", but praised the password and upgrade systems.

== Reboot ==
On August 26, 2024, Atari announced a "re-imagining" of Fatal Run, titled Fatal Run 2089, developed by MNSTR Studio using Unreal Engine 5. It is set to launch for Windows, Xbox Series X/S, Xbox One, PlayStation 5, PlayStation 4 and Nintendo Switch sometime in 2025.
