= Alien Brigade =

1990 video game

- Developer: Atari Corporation
- Publisher: Atari Corporation
- Programmer: Ken Grant
- Platform: Atari 7800
- Release: NA: 1990
- Genre: Rail shooter
- Mode: Single-player

Alien Brigade is a 1990 rail shooter video game developed and published by Atari Corporation for the Atari 7800. Similar in style to Operation Wolf, Alien Brigade tells the story of a soldier battling with alien invaders that take over the bodies of fallen soldiers.

Despite being released late in the Atari 7800's life cycle, Atari Corporation made more efforts to market the game than it had with other Atari 7800 titles. The game was referenced in Atari's 1990 shooter, Planet Smashers (Alien Brigade would return the favor by advertising Planet Smashers).

== Gameplay ==
The game is played from a first-person point of view and scrolls horizontally in two directions as various enemy creatures, possessed soldiers, human vehicles and alien vehicles attack the player character. Alien Brigade can either be played with the Atari 7800 joystick or with the Atari XG-1 light gun. It is one of five 7800 games compatible with the XG-1.

The game has five levels and four difficulty modes. The initial mission is to rescue hostages from an enemy camp, but the game then progresses to a waterfront battle, an underwater melee, a showdown in an underground mine, and then a final mountaintop battle. Adding to the challenge, the player must be careful not to shoot innocent bystanders.

Between levels, the player is briefed by the commanding officer, who advises of the situation and rates the player's performance in the level.

== Reception ==
Alien Brigade was reviewed in the September 1991 issue of Atari's own Atari Explorer magazine. Funkmaster V of Wrestling With Ghosts reviewed the game on Atari 7800 Forever and gave it a 4 out of 5, and ranks it as one of the best officially licensed game on the system.
