= Scrapyard Dog =

1990 video game

- Developers: BlueSky Software (7800); Creative Software Designs (Lynx)
- Publisher: Atari Corporation
- Composer: John Foley (Lynx)
- Platforms: Atari 7800, Lynx
- Release: 7800: NA: 1990; EU: 1990; Lynx: NA: 1991; EU: 1991
- Genre: Platform
- Mode: Single-player

Scrapyard Dog is a 1990 platform video game developed by BlueSky Software and published by Atari Corporation for the Atari 7800. It was followed by an Atari Lynx port in 1991.

== Plot ==
The player controls Louie whose dog, Scraps, was kidnapped by Mr. Big. The object of the game is to rescue Scraps through various stages.

== Gameplay ==
Atari 7800 version screenshot

The Atari 7800 version has 17 stages while the Atari Lynx has 33.

== Reception ==
Reception

Review scores
Publication	Score
GamePro	(7800) 19 / 25
IGN	(Lynx) 8.0 / 10
Aktueller Software Markt	(Lynx) 4 / 12
Atari Gaming Headquarters	(7800) 7 / 10
Consolemania	(Lynx) 76 / 100
Consoles +	(Lynx) 89%
Hobby Consolas	(Lynx) 87 / 100
Joystick	(Lynx) 79%
Micromanía	(Lynx) 51 / 60
Play Time	(Lynx) 75%
Player One	(Lynx) 65%
Power Play	(Lynx) 51%
ST Format	(Lynx) 73%

Robert Jung reviewed the Atari Lynx version of the game which was published to IGN. He wrote that, "Despite the cute graphics and the simple plot, this title offers good clean fun for players of all ages" and gave an 8 out of 10 score.

Atari 7800 Forever retrospectively scored the game 3.5 out of 5, identifying with the urban blighted world and praising the amount of unique surprises in the game, yet admonishing the extremely difficult jumps that feel cheap.
