= Desert Falcon =

1988 video game

- Atari 2600 box art
- Developer: General Computer Corporation
- Publisher: Atari Corporation
- Designer: Bob Polaro
- Programmer: List: Atari 7800 Mike Feinstein Bob Kakura John Mracek Chris Fitch Atari 2600 Bob Polaro Atari 8-bit Ken Rose
- Platforms: Atari 2600, Atari 7800, Atari 8-bit
- Release: Atari 7800: August 1988; Atari 2600: December 1988; Atari 8-bit: Mid-1989
- Genre: Scrolling shooter
- Mode: Single-player

Desert Falcon is a scrolling shooter video game developed by General Computer Corporation and published in 1988 by Atari Corporation for the Atari 2600 and Atari 7800. It was initially announced in 1984, prior to being named Desert Falcon, as one of the planned launch titles for the 7800. A version for Atari 8-bit computers, with XEGS-styled packaging, followed in 1989.

Designed by Bob Polaro, who also programmed the Atari 2600 version, Desert Falcon is loosely based on ancient Egyptian mythology. The diagonally-scrolling isometric graphics had reviewers comparing it to Zaxxon from 1982.

== Plot ==
Players take on the role of a falcon, striving to collect the Pharaoh's scattered treasures in the desert to earn points.

== Gameplay ==
Atari 2600 gameplay screenshot

The game uses a scrolling, isometric perspective. Vultures, warriors, flying fish, and other creatures guard treasures and try to stop the player. At the end of each level, the player faces a large, howling sphinx before moving forward. The falcon can shoot arrows to eliminate foes and defeat the sphinx.

Throughout the game are hieroglyphs in the sand. Landing and hopping over three hieroglyphs unlock what are labeled "super powers" in the manual. The specific combination of collected hieroglyphs determines the acquired ability, including invincibility, teleportation to a level's end, bonus points, a decoy to mislead enemies, and an air bomb that annihilates all airborne opponents.

== Development ==
The game was revealed in 1984 as part of the Atari 7800 announcement. It was referred to as both Sphinx and Nile Flyer.

== Reception ==
Reviewing the Atari 8-bit version for ANALOG Computing in 1989, Matthew J.W. Ratcliff wrote, "Desert Falcon has good graphics, cute sound effects, and a tired, boring theme." He cited Zaxxon several times, calling Desert Falcon a visually different spin on the same gameplay. New Atari User wrote, "The scrolling in Desert Falcon isn't quite as smooth as it could be," but complimented the animation of the falcon and the use of shadows. In Antic, David Plotkin wrote, "The manual describes a wide variety of enemies. Unfortunately, except for some flying triangles, they all looked pretty much alike". He still concluded with "It has excellent graphics and is very playable."

After playing the 7800 cartridge, Len Poggiali of Current Notes described it as "an average arcade game with a below average plot and above average visual appeal."
