= General Computer Corporation =

American hardware and software company

- Company logo after a name change
- Founded: 1981; United States
- Founders: Doug Macrae; John Tylko; Kevin Curran
- Defunct: 2015
- Fate: Disestablished
- Headquarters: New Bedford, Massachusetts, United States

General Computer Corporation (GCC), later GCC Technologies, was an American hardware and software company formed in 1981 by Doug Macrae, John Tylko, and Kevin Curran.

The company began as a video game developer and created the arcade games Ms. Pac-Man (1982) in-house for Bally MIDWAY and Food Fight (1983) as well as designing the hardware for the Atari 7800 console and many of its games.

In 1984 the company pivoted to developing home computer peripherals, such as the HyperDrive hard drive for the Macintosh 128K, and printers. GCC increasingly focussed on printers before it was disestablished in 2015.

== History ==
GCC started out making mod-kits for arcade video games. Super Missile Attack was sold as an enhancement board to Atari, Inc.'s Missile Command. Atari sued, but ultimately dropped the suit and hired GCC to develop games (and stop making enhancement boards for Atari's games without permission). They created an enhancement kit for Pac-Man called Crazy Otto which they sold to Midway, who in turn sold it as the sequel Ms. Pac-Man; they also developed Jr. Pac-Man, that game's successor.

Under Atari, Inc., GCC made the original arcade games Food Fight, Quantum, and the unreleased Nightmare; developed the Atari 2600 versions of Ms. Pac-Man and Centipede; produced over half of the Atari 5200 cartridges; and developed the chip design for the Atari 7800, plus the first round of cartridges for that system.

=== Peripherals ===
In 1984, the company changed direction to make peripherals for Macintosh computers: the HyperDrive (the Mac's first internal hard drive), the WideWriter 360 large format inkjet printer, and the Personal Laser Printer (the first QuickDraw laser printer). Prior to closing, the company focused exclusively on laser printers.

HyperDrive was unusual because the original Macintosh did not have any internal interfaces for hard disks. It was attached directly to the CPU, and ran about seven times faster than Apple's "Hard Disk 20", an external hard disk that attached to the floppy disk port.

The HyperDrive was considered an elite upgrade at the time, though it was hobbled by Apple's Macintosh File System, which had been designed to manage 400K floppy disks; as with other early Macintosh hard disks, the user had to segment the drive such that it appeared to be two or more partitions, called Drawers.

In June 1985 Apple announced that installing GCC peripherals would not violate its warranty prohibiting installing non-Apple components. GCC said that it had cultivated the relationship by providing products to Apple employees. The second issue of MacTech magazine, in January 1985, included a letter that summed up the excitement:

The BIG news is from a company called General Computer. They announced a Mac mod called HyperDrive, which is a RAM expansion to 512K, and the installation of a 10 meg hard disk with the controller INSIDE THE MACINTOSH. This allows direct booting from the hard disk, free modem port, no serial I/O to slow things down, and no external box to carry around. Price is $2,795 on a 128K machine or $2195 on a 512K machine. They do the installation or you can buy a kit from your dealer.

In 1986 GCC shipped the HyperDrive 2000, a 20MB internal hard disk that also includes a Motorola 68881 floating-point unit, but the speed advantage of the HyperDrive had been negated on the new Macintosh Plus computers by Apple's inclusion of an external SCSI port. General Computer responded with the "HyperDrive FX-20" external SCSI hard disk, but drowned in a sea of competitors that offered fast large hard disks.

General Computer changed its name to GCC Technologies and relocated to Burlington, Massachusetts. They continued to sell laser printers until 2015, at which point the company was disestablished.

== Employees ==
- Elizabeth (Betty) Ryan
- Lucy Gilbert
