= Ninja Golf =

1990 video game

- Developer: BlueSky Software
- Publisher: Atari Corporation
- Programmers: David A. Dentt; David R. Sullivan
- Artist: Dana Christian
- Platform: Atari 7800
- Release: NA: 1990
- Genres: Beat 'em up, sports
- Mode: Single-player

Ninja Golf is a 1990 golf video game developed by BlueSky Software and published by Atari Corporation for the Atari 7800. It was programmed by David A. Dentt and David R. Sullivan as one of the last releases for the console. A version for Atari 8-bit computers was in simultaneous production but was cancelled. In a gameplay mix between the sports and beat 'em up genres, the ninja player character hits a golf ball at the beginning of each hole, then fights enemies in side-scrolling sections to reach it. Each green is guarded by a fire-breathing dragon boss that the player must defeat by throwing shurikens.

Ninja Golf received mixed reviews at its release, though retrospectively it was commended for its unorthodox mix of genres and comparatively solid execution. An enhanced remake for iOS and Android was developed by Alpha Dog Games and released by Atari Interactive in 2019.

== Gameplay ==
The player (center) battles enemies in a sand trap. A mini-map and heads-up display cover the bottom third of the screen.

Ninja Golf mixes golf and beat 'em up gameplay and puts the player in the role of a ninja who has completed their training, tasked with nine holes of the titular sport as a final test. Each hole (stage) begins with the player aiming their golf ball via a mini-map and shooting it toward the green. The path to reach the ball is set up like a traditional side-scroller, where the player fights other ninjas and hostile animals along the way. These creatures include gophers, birds, giant frogs, sharks, and snakes, depending on the environment. For instance, sharks are encountered in water hazards and snakes in sand traps. Ninjas exist in all the environments, including underwater.

The player can dodge foes by jumping and crouching as well attack with punches, kicks, and a limited supply of throwing shurikens. All regular enemies die in a single hit. The player can pick up restorative items such as extra health, lives, and shurikens as well as temporary invincibility and an instant warp to the green. The pattern of taking golf swings and fighting towards the ball's landing spot repeats until the green is reached, where the player encounters a dragon boss that guards it. These battles take place in a third-person perspective. The player must hit the dragon with shurikens while moving either right or left to avoid its fireballs. The player's score increases with defeating enemies, picking up items, and finishes holes with a limited number of strokes. The game contains four difficulty levels: easy, medium, hard, and kamikaze.

== Development ==
Ninja Golf was developed by BlueSky Software with a team consisting of programmers David R. Sullivan and David A. Dentt alongside artist Dana Christian. Sullivan was contracted by BlueSky while Dentt was led to employment at the company in 1988 while working at arcade video game developer Cinematronics. Ninja Golf was one of several titles pitched by publisher Atari Corporation's internal software team in early 1989.

Sullivan claimed that BlueSky was originally set to create a comedic platformer in the spirit of the film Caddyshack, but the simultaneous popularity of ninjas in the 1980s and the success of golf games like Mean 18 led to the finalized concept. "The way it was explained to me was that sports games were popular, ninjas were popular, so Ninja Golf", Dentt recounted. "One can not help but be in awe of the thought process!" After being given the concept, the team expanded on it as development progressed, frequently receiving feedback from Atari. According to Sullivan, Christian was responsible for the game's more absurd elements and Atari was unhappy that the game swayed from a more serious tone.

The budget for the project was $77,000 USD. The programmers each worked on a separate port of the game: Dentt on a version for the Atari 7800 home console and Sullivan on a version for the Atari 8-bit computers. The two frequently shared code with one another at their weekly meetings at a Sizzler restaurant. Aside from some art, the builds were nearly identical. However, the 8-bit computer version was eventually cancelled and remaining work shifted solely to the 7800 release.

Dentt's equipment consisted of an Atari ST and one external hard disk drive. The team had planned to implement a 3D renderer for the golf gameplay, but a simpler side-view was quickly added instead as combat became the main focus. When coding the graphics, Dentt recalled that the 7800 split the screen into three distinct sections. Each section could swap its palette during interrupt, increasing the possible total of colors on-screen at once. Dentt hid a joystick test within the game even after his producer insisted it be removed.

== Release ==
Ninja Golf was one of a plethora of games first unveiled by Atari at the summer 1989 Consumer Electronics Show. This came alongside an announcement that the company intended to further support its consoles even as its market share continued to dwindle against overwhelming competition from Nintendo. Ninja Golf was released in North America in the fourth quarter of 1990 and was one of the last titles for the Atari 7800. Atari manufactured about 100,000 cartridges for retail. The game has since seen numerous re-releases. It was included on the Internet Archive's MESS emulator in 2014; as part of a collection of Atari games for the Evercade handheld in 2020; on the short-lived Plex Arcade streaming service in 2021; on the Atari 50 compilation for eighth and ninth generation consoles in 2022; and on cartridge for the Atari 2600+ console in 2024.

An enhanced remake of Ninja Golf was developed by Alpha Dog Games and published by Atari Interactive as a free-to-play application for iOS and Android around March 2019. Like the original game, the remake switches between golf and beat 'em up gameplay, but now features fully 3D graphics. In 2021, Atari sold off the distribution rights to the Ninja Golf remake alongside other free-to-play apps in order to refocus on marketing premium games for console and PC.

== Reception and legacy ==
Critical reception for Ninja Golf has been mixed, though retrospective media sources have considered the game very memorable due to its unusual premise and mix of genres. Robert Naytor of Hardcore Gaming 101 felt that neither the golf nor the beat 'em up gameplay were particularly well-realized, leading to a difficult and repetitive experience once the charm of the concept wears off. AllGame reviewer Joseph Scoleri III gave a similar assessment, summarized, "While these facets of the game are imaginative, amusing and fun, the overall gameplay seems a little bland in comparison." John Delaney of the Retro Gamer team noted the serious delivery of its humor as deadpan and its gameplay as fun despite being simplistic compared to other beat 'em ups and golf simulations.

Wireframe contributor Ian Dransfield summarized it as having "sort of Jack Nicklaus-does-Shinobi vibes. Is it good? No, not really. Is it absurd and funny? Yep. Perfect for golf haters everywhere." Brett Weiss wrote in his book Classic Home Video Games 1972-1984 that the game successfully combines distinct genres, lauding the boss encounters as graphically impressive and functionally reminiscent of the bonus stages from the original Shinobi. Atari Gaming Headquarters reviewer Matthew Lippart made a similar observation regarding the boss fights and offered general praise to its graphics. He commended the combat gameplay while noting its difficulty in attacking when jumping and summarizing it "basically Kung Fu with a really bad golf engine thrown in." Andy Slaven briefly mentioned in Video Game Bible, 1985-2002 that the game's premise "may sound wacky" but it is "surprisingly enjoyable".

On his list "The Best and Worst of '80s Ninja Video Games" Den of Geek writer Craig Lines proclaimed, "I'm not sure there's a more quintessentially '80s game in existence than Ninja Golf," calling it "endlessly inventive" and "one of the best of its kind." Levi Buchanan of IGN listed it as the second best release on the Atari 7800, stating in a tongue-in-cheek fashion, "Ninja Golf is a better conversation piece than a game. But how can you deny the concept? Or that box art?"

The game has been featured on other lists by magazines and websites in the decades following its original release. This includes Next Generation's "five most bizarre game concepts of all time", CNET's "30 dumbest videogame titles ever", Paste's "10 Goofy Golf Videogames that Aren't Mario Golf, Bleacher Report's "12 Most Insane Sports Video Games Ever", and Complex's "15 Most Violent Sports Video Games". The game's cover art has been considered among the worst of all time by IGN, Complex, ComicsAlliance, Comic Book Resources, T3, Sports Illustrated, and Grunge.
