= Crossbow (video game) =

1983 video game

- North American arcade flyer
- Developer: Exidy
- Publishers: Exidy; Atari Corporation; Absolute Entertainment
- Platforms: Arcade, Atari 2600, Atari 7800, Atari 8-bit, Commodore 64, MS-DOS
- Release: 1983, 1987
- Genre: Light gun shooter
- Modes: Single-player, multiplayer
- Arcade system: Exidy 440

Crossbow is a light gun shooter released as an arcade video game by Exidy in 1983. It was later published by Absolute Entertainment for the Commodore 64 and MS-DOS, and by Atari Corporation for the Atari 2600, Atari 7800, and Atari 8-bit computers starting in 1987. The game is controlled via a positional gun that resembles a full-sized crossbow.

Exidy promoted Crossbow to arcade operators as being convertible to new themes released in the future. Five themed conversion kits were created, each commencing with the letter 'c': Cheyenne, Combat, Crackshot, Clay Pigeon, and the controversial Chiller. Several more games were also released for the system: Hit 'n Miss, Showdown, Top Secret, and Who Dunnit.

== Gameplay ==
Arcade gameplay screenshot

Arcade screenshot, showing where the red, green, and blue choices lead

The player protects a band of adventurers from afar by shooting objects that threaten them. The adventurers enter from the left-hand side of the screen and attempt to cross the screen unharmed. If the player helps them reach the opposite side of the screen safely, the adventurers survive to the next scenario, and new adventurers are occasionally granted between scenarios.

In addition to the obstacles, the adventurers are vulnerable to the player's shots. The first time the player shoots an adventurer, he/she will be unharmed with an onscreen warning message displaying. Thereafter, shooting an adventurer will cause him/her to emit a cry of pain, and to walk at a slower pace the rest of the way across. A second shot will kill the adventurer.

Scenarios are chosen by shooting a destination on a map screen, which include: town, desert, volcano, cave, bridge, jungle, and castle. The goal is to reach the final scenario, past the castle, in which the player confronts the Master of Darkness, who presumably created the dangers in the game. Defeating the Master of Darkness requires shooting him in the eyes when they turn red (and deadly). The player is treated to a brief congratulation and a challenge to defeat the Master of Darkness again, "IF YOU DARE". Following this screen the player starts over with however many adventurers survived the confrontation.

Another aspect of the arcade version of the game was that when one inserted a quarter into the game, the game would play a sound file that said "You will die!"

== Reception ==
Gene Lewin of Play Meter magazine reviewed the dedicated arcade cabinet in 1983, scoring it 4 out of 10 for being "a good game but overpriced". In 1995, Flux magazine ranked Crossbow 98th on their Top 100 Video Games. They praised the game calling it "A true harbinger of future arcade hits."
