= Food Fight (video game) =

1983 video game

- Arcade flyer
- Developer: General Computer Corporation
- Publisher: Atari, Inc.
- Designers: Keith Sawyer; Jonathan Hurd
- Composer: Patty Goodson
- Platforms: Arcade, Atari 7800, Atari 8-bit
- Release: Arcade: NA: March 1983; EU: 1983; 7800: May 15, 1986; Atari 8-bit 1986
- Genre: Action
- Modes: Single-player, multiplayer

Food Fight (also known as Charley Chuck's Food Fight) is a 1983 action video game developed by General Computer Corporation and published by Atari, Inc. for arcades. The player guides Charley Chuck, who is trying to eat an ice cream cone before it melts, while avoiding four chefs bent on stopping him. 1,951 arcade cabinets were sold.

Food Fight was released for the Atari 7800 console in 1986, and also the same year as a cartridge for Atari 8-bit computers styled for the then new Atari XEGS. A port for the Atari 2600 was canceled.

== Gameplay ==
Charley, between two chefs, attempting to reach the cone on the left A third chef has been hit by food and briefly knocked out of play.

In Food Fight, the player controls a boy named Charley Chuck. The object of the game is to eat an ice cream cone located on the opposite side of an open playfield. The ice cream is slowly melting, and it must be consumed before it melts completely. Controls consist of an analog-position joystick and a button.

Standing between Charley and the ice cream are four chefs: Oscar, Angelo, Jacques, and Zorba. They are identified by the shape of their toques: big and round for Oscar, small and rectangular for Angelo, tall and slender for Jacques, and flat and limp for Zorba. The chefs appear from holes in the floor of the level and chase after Charley. The holes serve as respawn points should a chef meet with an accident during the round.

Scattered throughout the screen are piles of food, such as pies, peas, tomatoes, and bananas. Both the player and the chefs can grab food from the piles to throw at each other. The player can grab a piece of food by running over a pile, then throw it by aiming the joystick in a chosen direction and pressing the button. The supplies of most foods are limited, but watermelon is unlimited in supply. Whenever a chef is hit by food thrown by the player or another chef, he is knocked off the screen. The player loses a life if Charley touches a chef, is hit by a chef's thrown food, falls into an open hole, or fails to eat the ice cream before it completely melts.

The player scores points for hitting chefs with thrown food and for luring them into open holes. Eating the cone ends the level, and the player scores bonus points for every unused piece of food (except watermelon) left on the screen. The point value of the cone increases until level 50, then remains unchanged for the rest of the game. If Charley is holding a piece of food when he eats the cone, it will carry over to the next level.

Sometimes if the player has at least one close call with a chef and flying food during a level, the game plays back an instant replay of the entire level while music plays.

== Development ==
Food Fight was developed by General Computer Corporation (GCC), the company that designed the custom chips of the Atari 7800 and produced Midway's Ms. Pac-Man. Like Ms. Pac-Man, GCC's connection to Atari was born out of accusations of copyright infringement. The company had produced a kit to speed up Atari's Missile Command arcade machines, but with General Computer claiming the copyright for the modified game. Fearing for its intellectual property rights, Atari sued GCC for $15 million. The case was settled out of court, with Atari contracting GCC to produce video games for them, including Food Fight and Quantum.

In an interview Jonathan Hurd said everyone at GCC contributed to the development. The initials of the people who were most heavily involved in creating Food Fight are in the high score table.

=== Bugs ===
According to Hurd, the arcade version contains a serious bug: the game is reset if the cone is eaten at the last possible moment in a level that is chosen for an instant replay.

In rare cases in the Atari 7800 port, Charley can be hit by food or a chef during the instant replay. The game displays "ALMOST MADE IT" and restores the life that was just lost.

== Legacy ==
Food Fight clones Foodwar and Mudpies for the TRS-80 Color Computer were released in 1983. Mudpies was later published for the Atari ST in 1985.

The arcade version of Food Fight was included in the Game Pack 012 compilation for the Xbox 360 and Windows, through Microsoft's now defunct Game Room service.

A modern reimagining of Food Fight as a third-person shooter was released for the Atari VCS as an Early Access game in December 2023.

== World records ==
The world record high score for Food Fight using the game's default settings is 107,778,200 points, set by Justin Emory on July 4, 2021. Under tournament settings, the world record is 1,424,400 points, set by Justin Emory in April 2018.
