= Atari 7800 =

Home video game console

Atari 7800 ProSystem

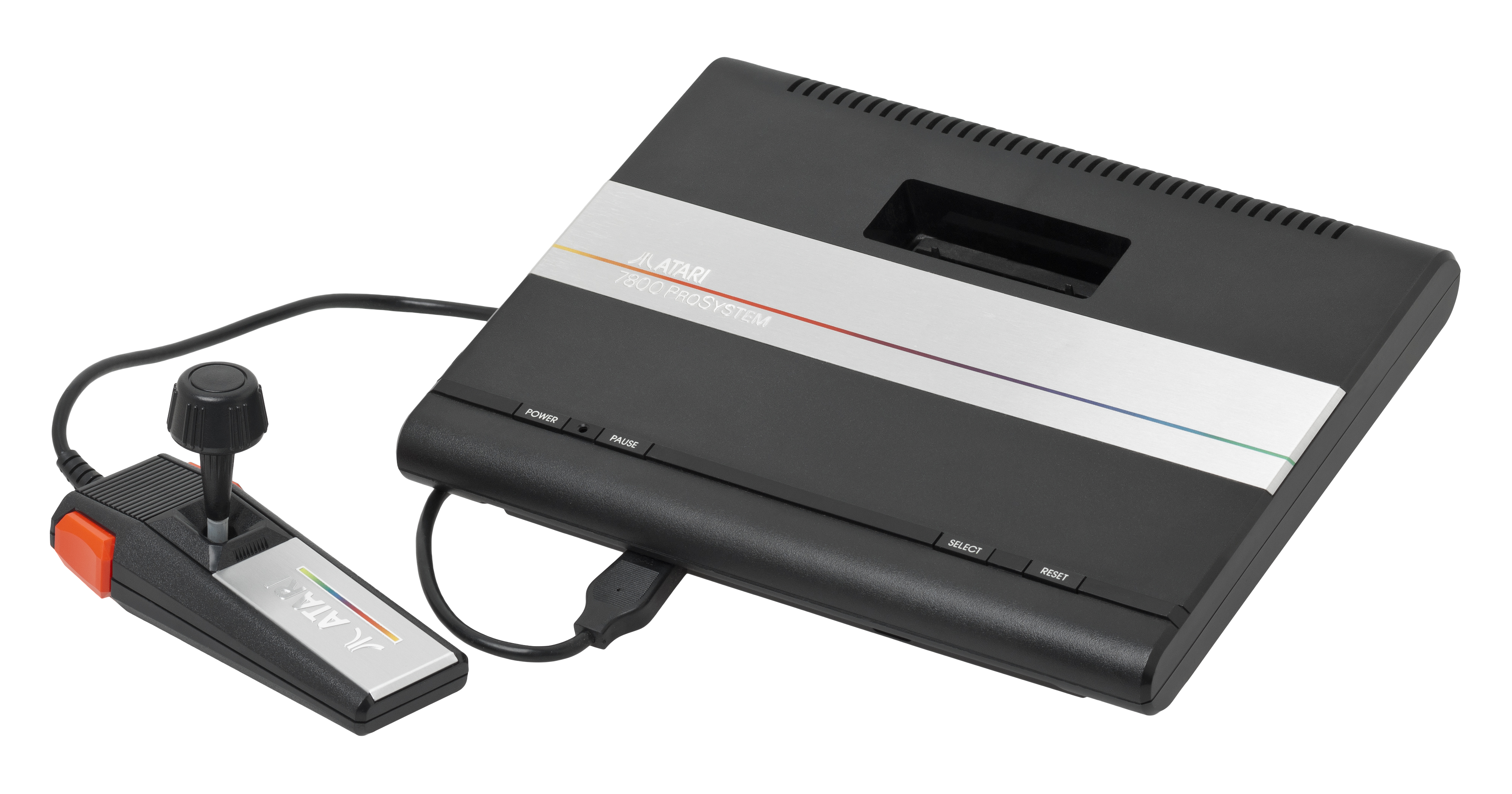
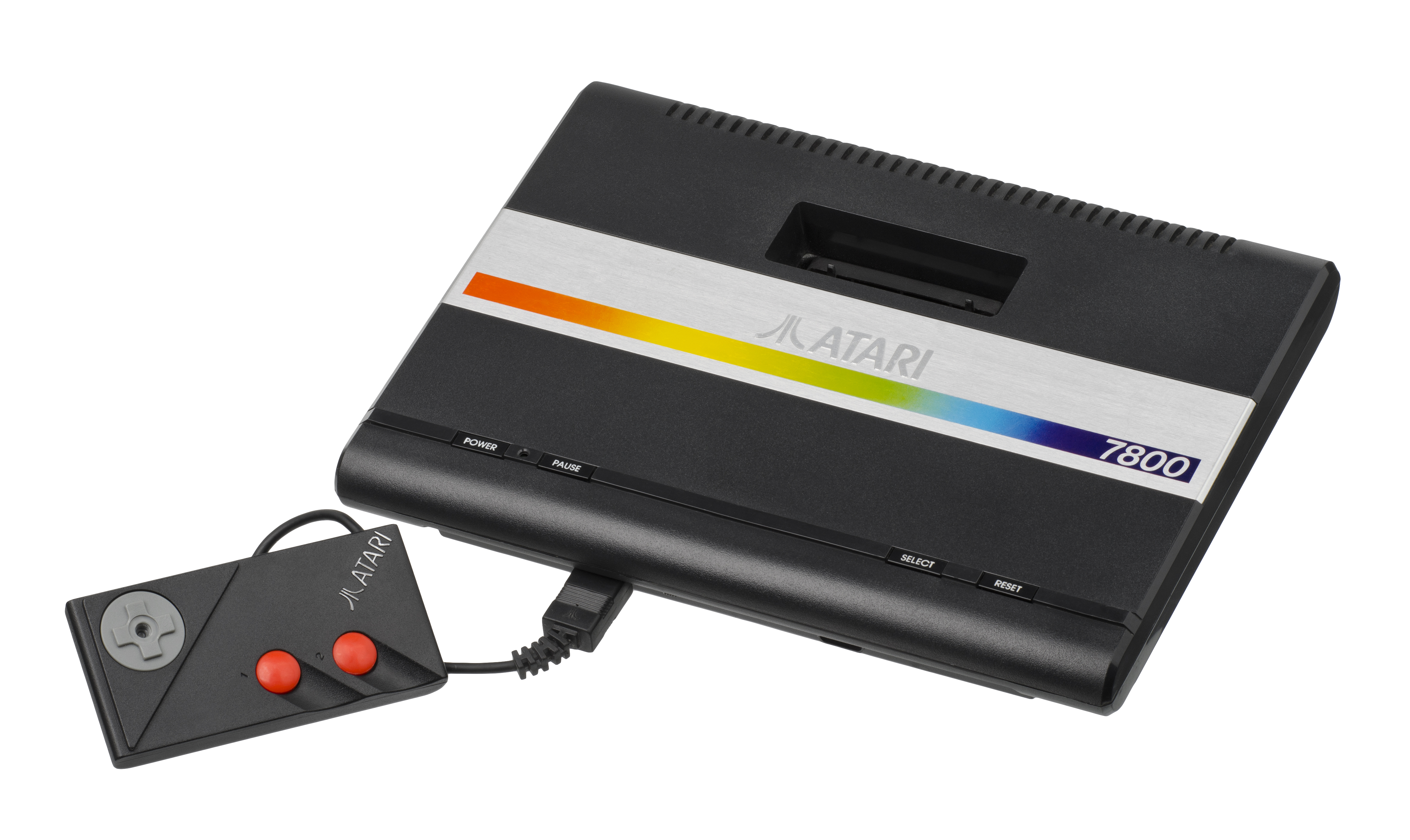
- Top: North American 7800; Bottom: European 7800
- Developer: General Computer Corporation
- Manufacturer: Atari, Inc. Atari Corporation
- Type: Home video game console
- Generation: Third
- Released: NA: May 1986; PAL: 1987
- Introductory price: US$140 (equivalent to $410 in 2025)
- Discontinued: 1992
- Media: ROM cartridge
- CPU: Atari SALLY @ 1.19-1.79 MHz
- Memory: 4 KB RAM on board 4 KB BIOS ROM (NTSC), 16 KB BIOS + Game ROM (PAL); 48 KB General Purpose Space (ROM, RAM, etc.) accessible at once
- Display: 160×240, 320×240 (288 vertical for PAL); 7, 9, or 25 colors out of 256 (Depending on the mode)
- Graphics: MARIA custom chip @ 7.16 MHz
- Best-selling game: Pole Position II (pack-in)
- Backward compatibility: Atari 2600
- Predecessor: Atari 5200
- Successor: Atari Panther (canceled); Atari XEGS

The Atari 7800 ProSystem, or simply the Atari 7800, is a home video game console released by Atari Corporation in May 1986 as the successor to both the Atari 2600 and Atari 5200. It can run almost all Atari 2600 cartridges, making it the first console with backward compatibility. It shipped with a two button controller, instead of the 2600-standard Atari CX40 joystick, and with Pole Position II as the pack-in game. The European model has a gamepad instead of a joystick. Most of the early releases for the system are ports of 1981–1983 arcade video games. The final wave of 7800 cartridges is closer in style to what was available on other late 1980s consoles, such as Scrapyard Dog and Midnight Mutants.

Designed by General Computer Corporation, the 7800 has custom graphics hardware similar to early 1980s arcade video games and is a significant improvement over Atari's previous consoles. The same Television Interface Adaptor chip that launched with the Atari VCS in 1977, included for compatibility with cartridges for that system, is used to generate two-channel audio for 7800 games. In an effort to prevent the flood of poor quality games that contributed to the video game crash of 1983, cartridges had to be digitally signed by Atari.

The Atari 7800 and an initial batch of games were first announced by Atari, Inc. on May 21, 1984, but general release was shelved after the purchase of Atari by Jack Tramiel who re-established the company as Atari Corporation. Support for the 7800, along with the 2600 and Atari 8-bit computers, was dropped in 1992.

== History ==
The Atari 7800 ProSystem was the first console from Atari, Inc. designed by an outside company: General Computer Corporation. It was developed in 1983–84 with an intended mass market rollout in June 1984, but was canceled after the sale of the company to Tramel Technology Ltd on July 2, 1984. The project was originally called the Atari 3600.

With a background in creating arcade games such as Food Fight, GCC designed the new system with a graphics architecture similar to arcade machines of the time. The CPU is a slightly customized 6502 processor, the Atari SALLY, running at 1.79 MHz. By some measures the 7800 is more powerful, and by others less, than the 1983 Nintendo Entertainment System. It uses the 2600's Television Interface Adaptor chip, with the same restrictions, for generating two channels of audio. Audio capability can be expanded via the cartridge port's audio line—with a sound chip in the cartridge—but this was only done in a few games.

=== Launch ===
The 7800 was announced on May 21, 1984, with units expected to ship in July of that year. Thirteen games were announced for the system's launch: Ms. Pac-Man, Pole Position II, Centipede, Joust, Dig Dug, Nile Flyer (eventually released as Desert Falcon), Robotron: 2084, Galaga, Food Fight, Ballblazer, Rescue on Fractalus! (later canceled), Track & Field, and Xevious. It was a significant technological leap over the Atari 2600 and Atari 5200.

On July 2, 1984, Warner Communications sold Atari's Consumer Division to Jack Tramiel. All projects were halted during an initial evaluation period. GCC had not been paid for their development of the 7800, and Warner and Tramiel fought over who was accountable. In May 1985, Tramiel relented and paid GCC. This led to additional negotiations regarding the launch titles GCC had developed, then an effort to find someone to lead their new video game division, which was completed in November 1985. The original production run of the Atari 7800 languished in warehouses until it was introduced in January 1986.

The console was released nationwide in May 1986 for $79.95 with games intended for the 7800's debut in 1984. It was aided by a marketing campaign with a budget in the "low millions" according to Atari Corporation officials. This was substantially less than the $9 million spent by Sega and the $16 million spent by Nintendo. The keyboard and high score cartridge planned by Warner were cancelled. The 7800 addressed many of the most common complaints with the preceding 5200, including a smaller size, built-in backward compatibility, and an improved controller design.

In February 1987, Computer Entertainer reported that 100,000 Atari 7800 consoles had been sold in the United States, including those which had been warehoused since 1984. This was less than the Master System's 125,000 and the NES's 1.1 million. Games were slowly released: Galaga in August, followed by Xevious in November. By the end of 1986, the 7800 had 10 games, compared to Sega's 20 and Nintendo's 36. Atari would sell over 1 million 7800 consoles by June 1988.

The Atari 7800 was released in the UK in September 1989 at the price of £69.95. It was supplied with two joypad controllers.

=== Discontinuation ===
In 1992, Atari Corporation announced the end of production and support for the 7800, 2600, and the 8-bit computer family including the Atari XEGS. At least one game, an unreleased port of Toki, was worked on past this date. In Europe, last stocks of the 7800 were sold until the summer/fall of 1995.

Retro Gamer magazine issue 132 reported that according to Atari UK Marketing Manager Darryl Still, "it was very well stocked by European retail; although it never got the consumer traction that the 2600 did, I remember we used to sell a lot of units through mail order catalogues and in the less affluent areas".

== Technical specifications ==
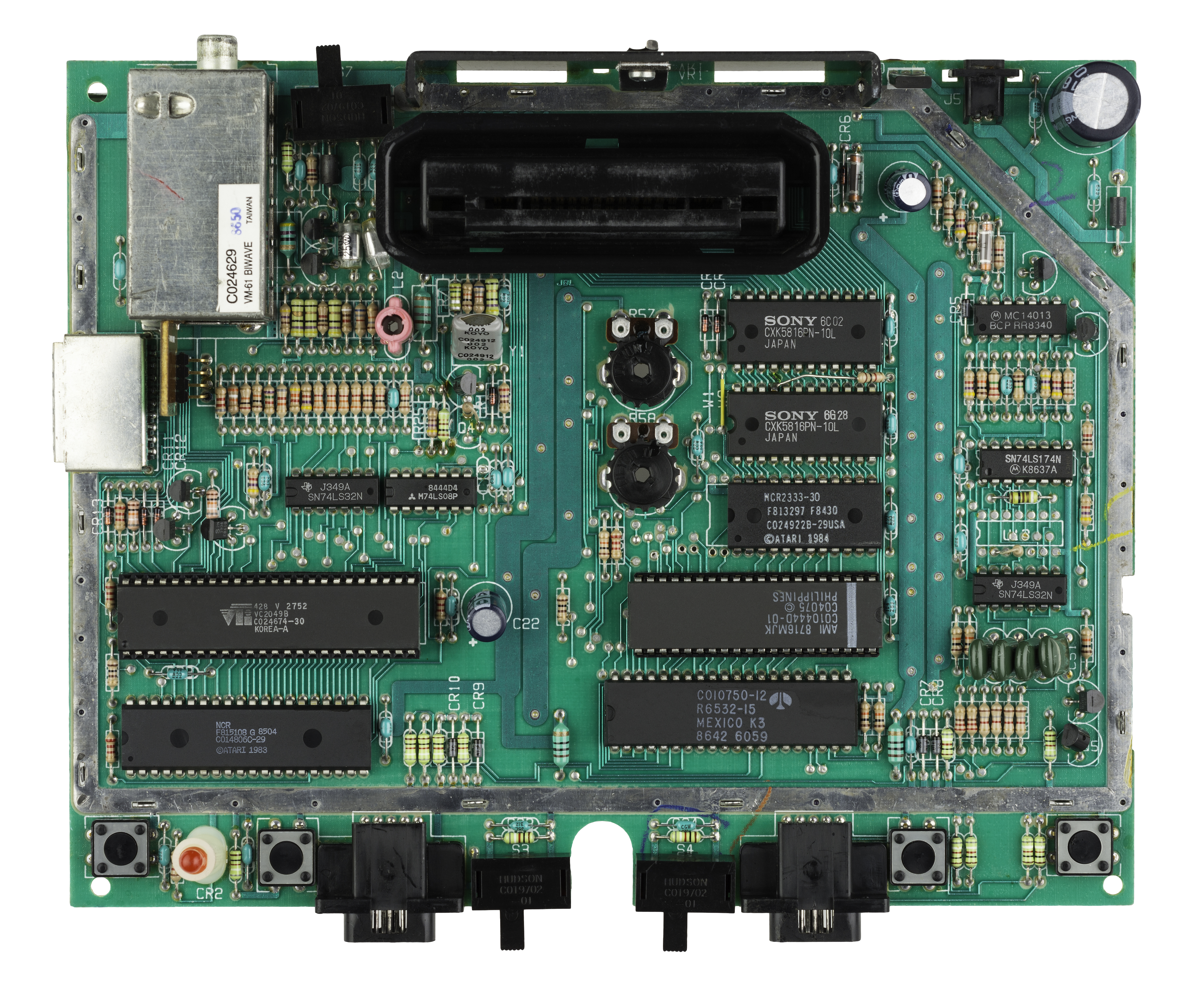
Motherboard of an American 7800 with the RF shielding removed

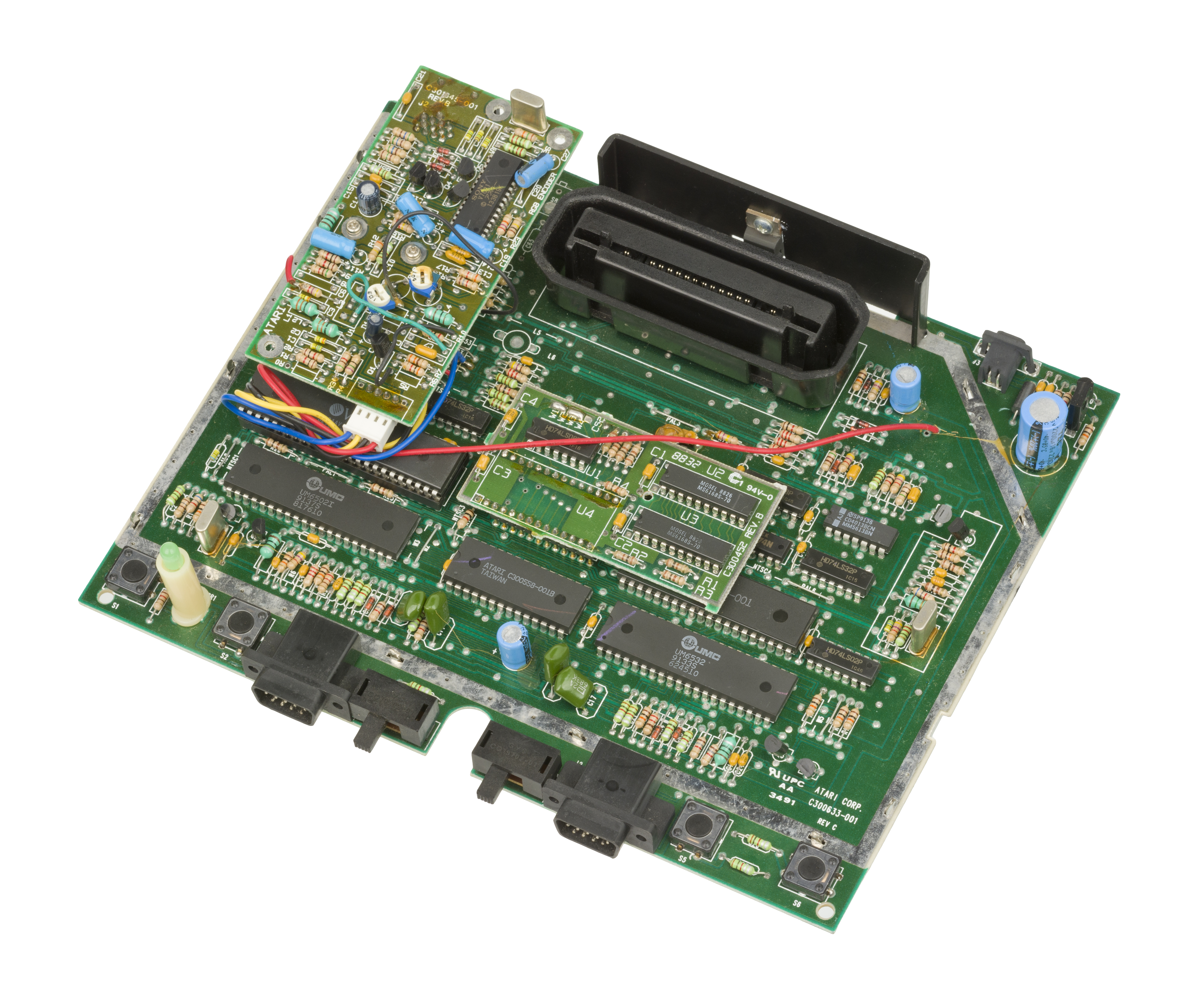
European motherboard modified by Atari to output RGB through a SCART connector

- CPU: Atari SALLY (custom variant of the 6502)
  - 1.79 (NTSC)/1.77 (PAL) MHz, which drops to 1.19 (NTSC)/1.18 (PAL) MHz when the Television Interface Adaptor or 6532 RAM-I/O-Timer chips are accessed
  - Unlike a standard 6502, SALLY can be halted in a known state with a single pin to let other devices control the bus.
  - Sometimes referred to by Atari as "6502C", but not the same as the official MOS Technology 6502C.
- RAM: 4 KB (2 6116 2Kx8 RAM ICs)
- ROM: built in 4 KB BIOS ROM (NTSC), built in 16 KB BIOS + Asteroids ROM (PAL), 48 KB General Purpose space (ROM, RAM, etc.) without bank switching
- Graphics: MARIA custom chip
  - Resolution: 160×240 (160×288 PAL) or 320×240 (320×288 PAL)
  - Color palette: 256 (16 hues * 16 luma), different graphics modes restricted the number of usable colors and the number of colors per sprite
  - Direct Memory Access (DMA, can be disabled)
  - Graphics clock: 7.16 MHz (NTSC), 7.09 MHz (PAL)
  - Line buffer: 200 bytes (double buffering), 160 sprite pixels per scanline, up to 30 sprites per scanline (without background), up to 100 sprites on screen
  - Sprite/zone sizes: Up to 32 bytes in width (amount of pixels changes depending on sprite video mode), height of 1 to 16 pixels
  - Colors per sprite: 1 to 12 (1 to 12 visible colors per sprite, 1 to 4 transparent/background colors)
  - Video Modes:
    - 160A - 160-pixel mode, 2bpp Sprites (Read Mode 0, Write Mode 0), up to 128-pixel wide sprites, all 25 colors available
    - 160B - 160-pixel mode, 4bpp Sprites (Read Mode 0, Write Mode 1), up to 64-pixel wide sprites, all 25 colors available
    - Read Mode 1 doesn't exist
    - 320D - 320-pixel mode, 1bpp Sprites (Read Mode 2, Write Mode 0), up to 256-pixel wide sprites, 7 colors available
    - 320B - 320-pixel mode, 2bpp Sprites (Read Mode 2, Write Mode 1), up to 128-pixel wide sprites, 7 colors available
    - 320A - 320-pixel mode, 1bpp Sprites (Read Mode 3, Write Mode 0), up to 256-pixel wide sprites, 9 colors available
    - 320C - 320-pixel mode, 2bpp Sprites (Read Mode 3, Write Mode 1), up to 128-pixel wide sprites, 9 colors available
- I/O: Joystick and console switch IO handled by 6532 RIOT and TIA
- Ports
  - 2 joystick ports
  - cartridge port
  - expansion connector (Only on rev 1 boards)
  - power in
  - RF output
- Sound: TIA as used in the 2600 for video and sound. In 7800 mode it is only used for sound.
  - At least three games include a POKEY sound chip for improved audio.

=== Graphics ===
Graphics are generated by the custom MARIA chip, which uses an approach common in contemporary arcade system boards and is different from other second and third generation consoles. Instead of a limited number of hardware sprites, MARIA treats everything as a sprite described in a series of display lists. Each display list contains pointers to graphics data and color and positioning information.

MARIA supports a palette of 256 colors and graphics modes which are either 160 pixels wide or 320 pixels wide. While the 320 pixel modes theoretically enable the 7800 to create games at higher resolution than the 256 pixel wide graphics found in the Nintendo Entertainment System and Master System, the processing demands of MARIA result in most games using the 160 pixel mode.

Each sprite can have from 1 to 12 colors, with 3 colors plus transparency being the most common. In this format, the sprite references one of 8 palettes, where each palette holds 3 colors. The background (visible when not covered by other objects) can also be assigned a color. In total, 25 colors can appear on a scan line.

The graphics resolution, color palettes, and background color can be adjusted between scan lines.

=== Sound ===
The 7800 uses the TIA chip for two channel audio, the same chip used in the 1977 Atari VCS, and the sound is of the same quality as that system. To compensate, GCC's engineers allowed games to include a POKEY audio chip in the cartridge. Three official releases from Atari do this: Ballblazer, Commando, and Tiger-Heli.

GCC planned to develop a more advanced sound chip, Minnie (Based on GUMBY), which could also be used in 7800 cartridges. This project was cancelled when Atari was sold to Jack Tramiel.

=== Digitally signed cartridges ===
In response to the large number of low quality, third party games released for the Atari 2600—a contributing factor to the video game crash of 1983—Atari required that cartridges for the 7800 be digitally signed. When a cartridge is inserted into the system, the BIOS generates a signature of the cartridge ROM and compares it to the one stored on the cartridge. If they match, the console operates in 7800 mode, granting the game access to MARIA and other features, otherwise the console operates as a 2600. This digital signature code is not present in PAL 7800s, which use various heuristics to detect 2600 cartridges, due to export restrictions.

=== Backward compatibility ===
The 7800's compatibility with the Atari 2600 is made possible by including many of the same chips used in the 2600. When playing an Atari 2600 game, the 7800 uses a Television Interface Adaptor chip to generate graphics and sound. The processor is slowed to 1.19 MHz, to mirror the performance of the 2600's 6507 chip. RAM is limited to 128 bytes and cartridge data is accessed in 4K blocks.

When in 7800 mode (signified by the appearance of the full-screen Atari logo), the graphics are generated entirely by the MARIA graphics processing unit. All system RAM is available and cartridge data is accessed in larger 48K blocks. The system's SALLY 6502 runs at its normal 1.79 MHz. The 2600 chips are used to generate sound and to provide the interfaces to the controllers and console switches.

=== System revisions ===
- Initial version: two joystick ports on lower front panel. Side expansion port for upgrades and add-ons. Bundled with two CX24 Pro-Line joysticks, AC adapter, switchbox, RCA connecting cable, and Pole Position II cartridge.
- Second revision: Slightly revised motherboard. Expansion port connector removed from motherboard but is still etched. Shell has indentation of where expansion port was to be.
- Third revision: Same as above but with only a small blemish on the shell where the expansion port was.

== Peripherals ==
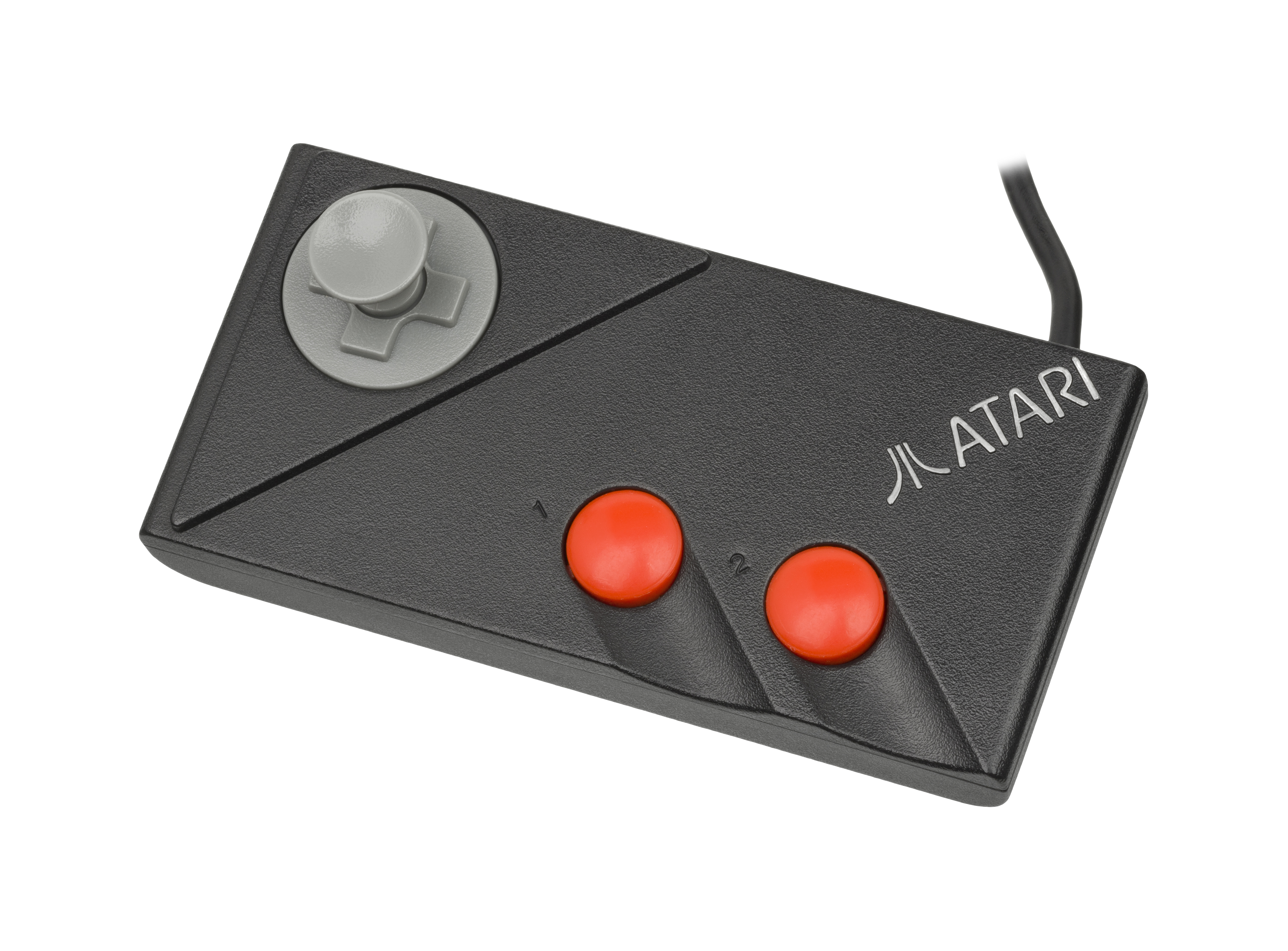
The gamepad of later European Atari 7800s with the thumbstick screwed in

The Atari 7800 came bundled with the Atari Pro-Line Joystick, a two-button controller with a joystick for movement. The Pro-Line was developed for the 2600 and advertised in 1983, but delayed until Atari proceeded with the 7800. The right fire button only works as a separate fire button for certain 7800 games; otherwise, it duplicates the left fire button, allowing either button to be used for 2600 games. While physically compatible, the 7800's controllers do not work with the Master System, and Sega's controllers are unable to use the 7800's two-button mode.

In response to ergonomic issues with the Pro-Line controllers, Atari released a joypad controller, similar in style to those on Nintendo and Sega systems, with the European 7800. It was not available in the United States.

The XG-1 light gun, bundled with the Atari XEGS and also sold separately, is compatible with the 7800. Atari released five 7800 light gun games: Alien Brigade, Barnyard Blaster, Crossbow, Meltdown, and Sentinel.

=== Cancelled peripherals ===
After the acquisition of the Atari Consumer Division by Jack Tramiel in 1984, several expansion options for the system were cancelled:

- The High Score Cartridge was designed to save high scores for up to 65 separate games. It was intended as a pass-through device, similar to the later Game Genie. Nine games were programmed to support the cartridge.
- A computer keyboard, which included an SIO port and audio input/output ports for a standard cassette storage device. The keyboard plugged into a controller port and allowed standard Atari 8-bit computer hardware to be used. It did not make the 7800 compatible with Atari computer software.
- The expansion port for connection to a LaserDisc player and other peripherals was removed in the second and third revisions of the 7800.
- A dual joystick holder was designed for Robotron: 2084 and future games like Battlezone, but not produced.
- A 7800 cartridge adaptor that would bring 7800 compatibility to the Atari 5200. It was essentially a 7800 PCB designed to be plugged into the 5200's cartridge slot just like the similar VCS Cartridge Adaptor.

== Games ==
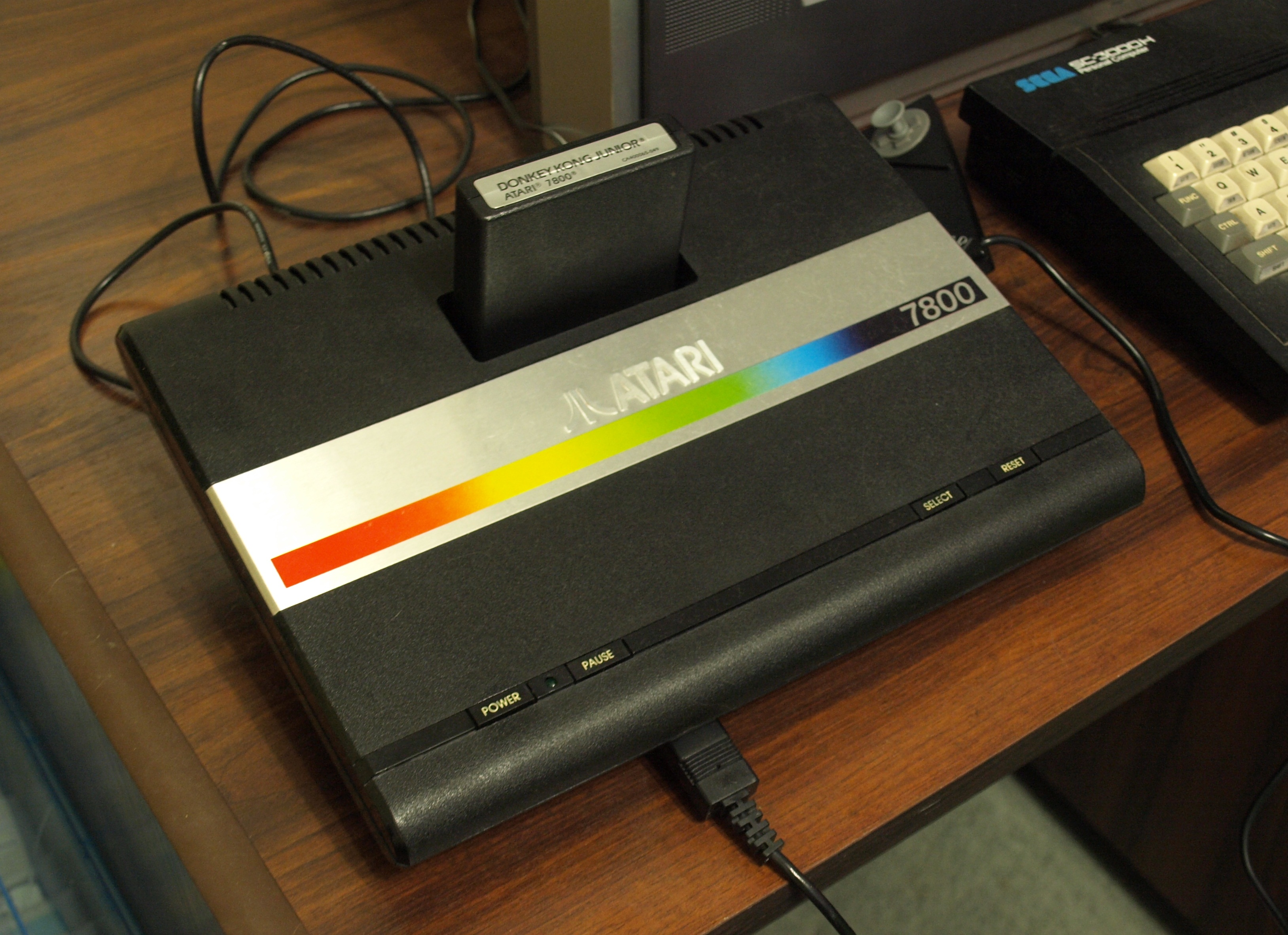
Atari 7800 with Donkey Kong Junior cartridge

While the system can play the over 400 games for the Atari 2600, there were only 59 official releases for the 7800. The lineup emphasized high-quality versions of games from the golden age of arcade video games. Pole Position II, Dig Dug, and Galaga, by the time of the 1986 launch, were three, four, and five years old, respectively. A raster graphics version of 1979's Asteroids was released in 1987. In 1988, Atari published a conversion of Nintendo's Donkey Kong, seven years after the original arcade game and five years after the Atari 8-bit computer cartridge. Atari also marketed a line of games called "Super Games" which were arcade and computer games previously not playable on a home console such as One-On-One Basketball and Impossible Mission.

Eleven games were developed and sold by three third-party companies under their own labels (Absolute Entertainment, Activision, and Froggo) with the rest published by Atari Corporation. Most of the games from Atari were developed by outside companies under contract.

Some NES games were developed by companies who had licensed their title from a different arcade manufacturer. While the creator of the NES version would be restricted from making a competitive version of an NES game, the original arcade copyright holder was not precluded from licensing out rights for a home version of an arcade game to multiple systems. Through this loophole, Atari 7800 conversions of Mario Bros., Double Dragon, Commando, Rampage, Xenophobe, Ikari Warriors, and Kung-Fu Master were licensed and developed.

A final batch of games was released by Atari in 1990: Alien Brigade, Basketbrawl, Fatal Run, Meltdown, Midnight Mutants, Motor Psycho, Ninja Golf, Planet Smashers, and Scrapyard Dog. Scrapyard Dog was later released for the Atari Lynx.

== Legacy ==
=== Retro systems ===
In 2004, the Infogrames-owned version of Atari released the Atari Flashback console. It resembles a miniature Atari 7800 and has five 7800 and fifteen 2600 games built in. Built using famiclone hardware instead of recreating the Atari 7800 hardware, it was criticized for failing to properly replicate the actual gaming experience. A subsequent 7800 project was cancelled after prototypes were made.

On November 29, 2024, Atari and Plaion released the Atari 7800+, a smaller-scale replica of the 7800, specifically the European model. It includes support for physical cartridges of both the Atari 2600 and 7800 via emulation. It is effectively a variant of the Atari 2600+, which was introduced in 2023.

=== Game development ===
The digital signature long prevented aftermarket games from being developed. The signing software was eventually found and released at Classic Gaming Expo in 2001. Several new Atari 7800 games such as Beef Drop, B*nQ, Combat 1990, CrazyBrix, Failsafe, and Santa Simon have been released.

In July 2009, the source code to 13 games, the operating system, and Atari ST-hosted development tools, were released. Commented assembly language source code was made available for Centipede, Commando, Crossbow, Desert Falcon, Dig Dug, Food Fight, Galaga, Hat Trick, Joust, Ms. Pac-Man, Super Stunt Cycle, Robotron: 2084, and Xevious.

== See also ==
- History of Atari
- List of Atari 7800 games
- List of Atari 2600 games
