= List of Atari 2600 games =

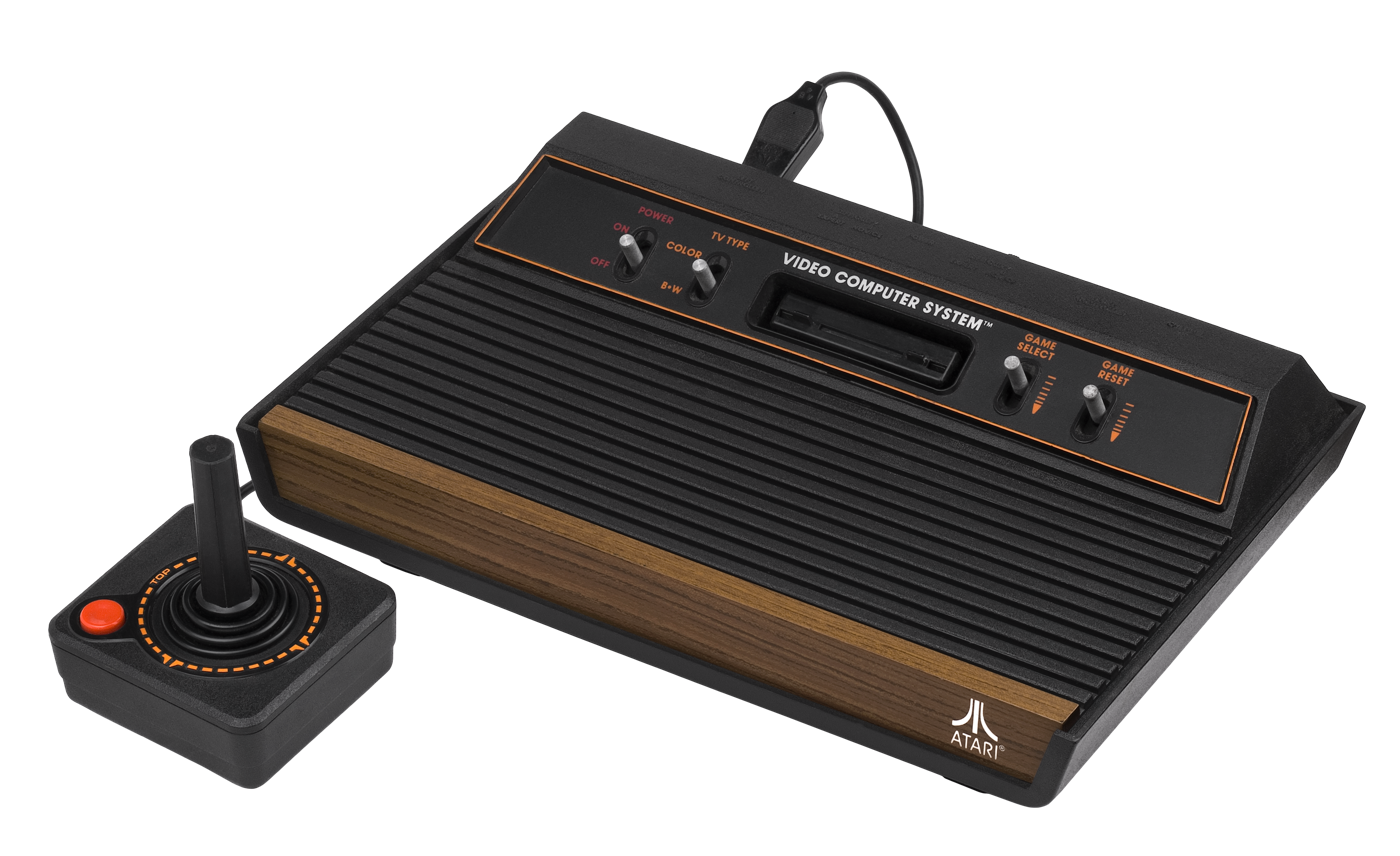
The Atari VCS with CX40 joystick

The Atari 2600, first released as the Atari Video Computer System (VCS) in 1977, is a second generation home video game console. It was manufactured and sold by Atari, Inc., then a subsidiary of Warner Communications. After 1984, the console was sold by Atari Corp., following the acquisition of the brand by Jack Tramiel. It was discontinued as a commercial product in 1992, six years before the Atari brand would be again sold to Hasbro and eventually Infogrames (today known as Atari SA). In its early years, Sears also sold the console under its own branding as the Tele-Games Video Arcade, releasing many early games under that label as well. Games were sold as ROM cartridges, typically in black rectangular shells. The exact size and shape varied by manufacturer.

This list is divided into three sections:

- 399 games had a well documented retail release, widely available on store shelves before 1993.
- 20 games were sold in limited numbers at events or through mail-order.
- 69 have unclear origins, and were released with different labels by many companies

In addition, more than 106 games have been released after discontinuation, mostly by hobbyists as homebrew projects, and at least 29 previously unreleased games have been discovered and sold in some capacity as prototypes. Many reproductions of the Atari 2600 hardware have been produced, in some cases with exclusive games. These include the ColecoVision's Expansion Module #1 adapter, the Coleco Gemini, the MegaBoy, and most recently the Atari Flashback and Atari 2600+ systems.

In 1977, the console was released with nine cartridges: Air-Sea Battle, Basic Math, Blackjack, Combat, Indy 500, Star Ship, Street Racer, Surround and Video Olympics. By the start of 1980, 31 games had been released, all produced internally at Atari. In 1980, Atari released Space Invaders, the first externally licensed port of an arcade game and an unprecedented success that catapulted the 2600 into mainstream popularity. A new company called Activision also started releasing games for the system in 1980, they were the first third-party company to release games for any home console. Activision initially released games without a license, but eventually paid Atari royalty fees following the settlement of a lawsuit.

Heading into 1982, many companies, looking to capitalize on the boom in video game sales, followed Activision's lead and began publishing their own games for the 2600. These included toy companies, such as Mattel, Coleco, Parker Brothers, and Fisher-Price (through sister company U.S. Games), entertainment conglomerates such as 20th Century Fox, CBS, and Paramount Pictures (through Sega Enterprises), and video game startups such as Imagic, Games by Apollo, CommaVid, and more. The amount of game releases spiked, from 16 games in 1981 to 105 games in 1982. On December 8, 1982, following a disastrous sales report by Atari, stocks related to video games began to plummet. This marked the beginning of the video game crash of 1983. By the end of 1984, almost every third-party publisher besides Activision had been forced out of the video game market, either by bankruptcy or restructuring. The sudden volume of game releases is commonly accepted as one of the main causes of the crash.

The newly formed Atari Corp. and a handful of other third-parties continued to release new games for the Atari 2600 and the backwards compatible Atari 7800 into the early 90s, especially in PAL regions. However, sales were dwarfed by other systems, such as the Nintendo Entertainment System, and new game releases disappeared by 1993. The final licensed games released in North America were Ikari Warriors, MotoRodeo, Sentinel, and Xenophobe in July 1990, and the final licensed games released in Europe was Acid Drop in 1992. Since 2023, Atari has released games designed for the system via the Atari 2600+. The best selling game for the system was Pac-Man, followed by Space Invaders and Donkey Kong (see list of best-selling Atari 2600 video games).

== Retail game releases ==
Every game on this list would have been widely available on store shelves around the time of their release. They were also generally previewed at trade shows, such as CES or the Toy Fair, and covered widely by contemporary gaming magazines. Most games by M Network, a label of Mattel, were re-released Intellivision games, sometimes under different names. Games released by Starpath were cassette tapes compatible with the Starpath Supercharger. A small number of games, most notably X-Man and Custer's Revenge, were pornographic and faced heavy controversy upon their release. Designers in italics were not credited in the box art, manual, or game itself, and were only credited independently following release.

Title	Designers	Developer	Publisher	Release Date		Ref.
Title	Designers	Developer	Publisher	NA	PAL	Ref.
3-D Tic-Tac-Toe	Carol Shaw	Atari	Atari, Inc./Sears	July 1980	Unknown (Note: Released in the UK at an unknown date.)	
Acid Drop	Dennis Kiss	Salu Ltd	Salu Ltd	Unreleased	1992	
The Activision Decathlon	David Crane	Activision	Activision	August 1983	1984	
Adventure	Warren Robinett	Atari	Atari, Inc./Sears	March 1980	Unknown	
Adventures of Tron; Adventures on GX-12 (Note: Published under this name by Telegames.)	Hal Finney	APh	M Network; Telegames	February 1983	Unknown	
Air Raiders; Bogey Blaster	Larry Zwick	APh	M Network; Telegames	February 1983	Unknown	
Air-Sea Battle; Target Fun_{Sears}	Larry Kaplan	Atari	Atari, Inc./Sears	September 1977	Q4 1978	
Airlock		Data Age	Data Age	October 1982	Unreleased	
Alien	Doug Neubauer	Doug Neubauer	Fox Video Games	December 1982	Unknown	
Alpha Beam with Ernie	Michael Callahan, Preston Stuart	Atari	Atari, Inc. (Note: Developed in partnership with the Children's Computer Workshop.)	November 1983	Q4 1983	
Amidar	Ed Temple	Parker Bros.	Parker Brothers (Note: Licensed by Konami.)	November 1982	Q1 1983	
Armor Ambush (Armor Battle)	Hal Finney	APh	M Network; Telegames	September 1982	Unknown	
Artillery Duel		Action Graphics	Xonox	November 1983	1984	
Asteroids	Brad Stewart	Atari	Atari, Inc./Sears	August 1981	Q3 1981	
Astroblast (Astrosmash)	Hal Finney	APh	M Network; Telegames	July 1982	Unknown	
Atlantis	Dennis Koble	Imagic	Imagic	July 1982	Q3 1982	
Bachelor Party; Bachelorette Party (Note: Gender-swapped version, where each character is replaced with one of the opposite gender.)		JHM Ltd.	Mystique; PlayAround	November 1982	Unknown	
Backgammon	Craig Nelson	Atari	Atari, Inc./Sears	November 1979	Unknown	
Bank Heist	Bill Aspromonte	Fox Video Games	Fox Video Games	July 1983	Unknown	
Barnstorming	Steve Cartwright	Activision	Activision	March 1982	Q3 1982	
Basic Math; Fun with Numbers; Math_{Sears}	Gary Palmer	Atari	Atari, Inc./Sears	September 1977	Unknown	
BASIC Programming	Warren Robinett	Atari	Atari, Inc.	April 1980	Q3 1981	
Basketball	Alan Miller	Atari	Atari, Inc./Sears	October 1978	Unknown	
BattleZone	Mike Feinstein, Brad Rice	GCC	Atari, Inc.	August 1983	Q4 1983	
Beamrider	David Rolfe	Cheshire Engineering	Activision	July 1984	1984	
Beany Bopper	Grady Ward	Sirius Software	Fox Video Games	October 1982	Unknown	
Beat 'Em & Eat 'Em; Philly Flasher		JHM Ltd.	Mystique; PlayAround	November 1982	Unknown	
Berenstain Bears (Note: Included with the Coleco Gemini, a clone of the Atari 2600 with a voice module.)			Coleco	March 1984	Unknown	
Bermuda Triangle	J. Ray Dettling	Data Age	Data Age	March 1983	Unreleased	
Berzerk	Dan Hitchens	Atari	Atari, Inc./Sears (Note: Licensed by Stern Electronics.)	August 1982	Q3 1982	
Big Bird's Egg Catch	Christopher Omarzu	Atari	Atari, Inc.	November 1983	1984	
Blackjack	Bob Whitehead	Atari	Atari, Inc./Sears	September 1977	Unknown	
Blue Print		CBS Electronics	CBS Electronics (Note: Licensed by Bally Midway.)	July 1983	Unknown	
BMX Air Master	Adam Clayton	TNT Games	TNT Games; Atari Corp.	August 1989	Unknown	
Boing!	Alex Leavens, Shirley Ann Russell	First Star Software	First Star Software	January 1984	Unknown	
Bowling	Larry Kaplan	Atari	Atari, Inc./Sears	March 1979	Unknown	
Boxing	Bob Whitehead	Activision	Activision	August 1980	Q3 1981	
Brain Games	Larry Kaplan	Atari	Atari, Inc./Sears	October 1978	Unknown	
Breakout; Breakaway IV_{Sears}	Brad Stewart	Atari	Atari, Inc./Sears	October 1978	Unknown	
Bridge	Larry Kaplan	Activision	Activision	December 1980	Q3 1982	
Buck Rogers: Planet of Zoom		Sega	Sega	November 1983	1984	
Bugs		Data Age	Data Age	October 1982	Unreleased	
Bumper Bash	David Lubar	Sirius Software	Spectravision	1983	Unknown	
Bump 'n' Jump	Dave Akers, Jeff Ratcliff	Mattel	M Network (Note: Licensed by Data East.); Telegames	November 1983	Unknown	
BurgerTime	Ron Surratt	Mattel	M Network; Telegames	August 1983	Unknown	
Burning Desire; Jungle Fever		JHM Ltd.	Mystique; PlayAround	1983	Unknown	
Cakewalk	Irwin Gaines	CommaVid	CommaVid	June 1983	Unknown	
California Games	Steve Baker, Peter Engelbrite	Epyx	Epyx	June 1988	Unknown	
Canyon Bomber	David Crane	Atari	Atari, Inc./Sears	March 1979	Unknown	
Carnival	Jessica Stevens (Note: Then credited as Steve Kitchen.)	Woodside Design Associates	Coleco	November 1982	Q2 1983	
Casino; Poker Plus_{Sears}	Bob Whitehead	Atari	Atari, Inc./Sears	March 1979	Unknown	
Centipede		GCC	Atari, Inc.	March 1983	Q2 1983	
The Challenge of Nexar	David Lubar	Sirius Software	Spectravision	September 1982	Q1 1983	
Checkers	Alan Miller	Activision	Activision	August 1980	Unknown	
China Syndrome		Spectravision	Spectravision	September 1982	Q1 1983	
Chopper Command	Bob Whitehead	Activision	Activision	June 1982	Q3 1982	
Chuck Norris Superkicks; Super Kung-Fu^{PAL} Kung Fu Superkicks: Pursuit of the Ninja		VSS	Xonox; Telegames	November 1983	1984	
Circus Atari; Circus_{Sears}	Mike Lorenzen	Atari	Atari, Inc./Sears	July 1980	Unknown	
Coconuts	Jim Rupp, Jack Woodman	Telesys	Telesys	October 1982	Unreleased	
Codebreaker		Atari	Atari, Inc./Sears	October 1978	Unknown	
Combat; Tank Plus_{Sears}	Joe Decuir; Larry Wagner	Atari	Atari, Inc./Sears	August 1977 (Note: The exact date of Combat's release along side the VCS is disputed. However, Combat was released prior to the other eight games released in 1977.)	Q3 1978	
Commando	Mike Reidel	Imagineering	Activision (Note: Licensed by Data East, U.S. distributor for Capcom.)	June 1988	Unknown	
Commando Raid	Wes Trager	JWDA	U.S. Games	October 1982	Unknown	
Communist Mutants from Space (cassette)		Starpath	Starpath	August 1982	Q2 1983	
Congo Bongo		Sega	Sega	December 1983	1984	
Cookie Monster Munch	Gary Stark	Atari	Atari, Inc.	December 1983	Q4 1983	
Cosmic Ark	Rob Fulop	Imagic	Imagic	July 1982	Q3 1982	
Cosmic Commuter	John Van Ryzin	Activision	Activision	August 1985	Unknown	
Cosmic Creeps	Don Ruffcorn	Telesys	Telesys	November 1982	Q3 1982	
Cosmic Swarm	John Bronstein	CommaVid	CommaVid	May 1982	Unknown	
Crackpots	Dan Kitchen	Activision	Activision	July 1983	Unknown	
Crash Dive	Bill Aspromonte	Fox Video Games	Fox Video Games	September 1983	Q1 1984	
Cross Force		Spectravision	Spectravision	September 1982	Q1 1983	
Crossbow	Dan Kitchen	Imagineering	Atari Corp. (Note: Licensed by Exidy.)	May 1988	Unknown	
Crypts of Chaos	John Marvin	Fox Video Games	Fox Video Games	February 1983	Unknown	
Crystal Castles	Peter C. Niday	Atari	Atari, Inc.	April 1984	1984	
Custer's Revenge; Westward Ho^{PAL} General Re-Treat		JHM Ltd.	Mystique; PlayAround	November 1982	Unknown	
Dark Cavern; Night Stalker	Hal Finney	APh	M Network; Telegames	November 1982	1989	
Dark Chambers		Sculptured Software	Atari Corp.	May 1989	Unknown	
Deadly Duck	Ed Hodapp	Sirius Software	Fox Video Games	October 1982	Unknown	
Death Trap	Jim Jacob	Avalon Hill	Avalon Hill	July 1983	Unknown	
Defender	Bob Polaro	Atari	Atari, Inc./Sears (Note: Licensed by Williams Electronics.)	June 1982	Q3 1982	
Demolition Herby	Don Ruffcorn	Telesys	Telesys	January 1983	Q4 1983	
Demon Attack	Rob Fulop	Imagic	Imagic	April 1982	Q3 1982	
Demons to Diamonds	Nick Turner	Atari	Atari, Inc./Sears	July 1982	Q3 1982	
Desert Falcon	Bob Polaro	Bobco	Atari Corp.	December 1987	Unknown	
Dig Dug		GCC	Atari, Inc. (Note: Licensed by Namco.)	October 1983	Q4 1983	
Dodge 'Em; Dodger Cars_{Sears}	Carla Meninsky	Atari	Atari, Inc./Sears	September 1980	Q1 1980	
Dolphin	Matthew Hubbard	Activision	Activision	May 1983	Unknown	
Donkey Kong	Garry Kitchen	Imaginative Systems Software	Coleco (Note: Licensed by Nintendo.); Atari Corp. (Note: Reissued with license in 1987.)	July 1982	Q2 1983	
Donkey Kong Junior		Woodside Design Associates	Coleco; Atari Corp.	September 1983	Unknown	
Double Dragon	Dan Kitchen	Imagineering	Activision (Note: Licensed by Technōs Japan.)	Q3 1989	Unknown	
Double Dunk	Matthew Hubbard	Atari	Atari Corp.	May 1989	Unknown	
Dragonfire	Bob Smith	Imagic	Imagic	December 1982	Q1 1983	
Dragonstomper (cassette)		Starpath	Starpath	November 1982	Q2 1983	
Dragster	David Crane	Activision	Activision	August 1980	Q3 1981	
The Earth Dies Screaming	Dan Thompson	Sirius Software	Fox Video Games	June 1983	Unknown	
Eggomania		JWDA	U.S. Games; Carrere^{PAL}	January 1983	Q4 1983	
Encounter at L-5		Data Age	Data Age	October 1982	Unreleased	
Enduro	Larry Miller	Activision	Activision	May 1983	Q3 1983	
Entombed	Steve Sidley, Paul Allen Newell, Tom Sloper, Duncan Muirhead	Western Technologies	U.S. Games	March 1983	Unknown	
Escape from the Mindmaster (cassette)		Starpath	Starpath	November 1982	Q2 1983	
Espial		Tigervision	Tigervision (Note: Licensed by Orca Corporation.)	May 1984	Unknown	
E.T. the Extra-Terrestrial	Howard Scott Warshaw	Atari	Atari, Inc.	December 1982	Q4 1982	
Fantastic Voyage	David Lubar	Sirius Software	Fox Video Games	December 1982	Unknown	
Fast Eddie	Mark Turmell	Sirius Software	Fox Video Games	October 1982	Unknown	
Fast Food	Don Ruffcorn, Jack Woodman	Telesys	Telesys	October 1982	Q2 1983	
Fatal Run	Steve Aguirre	Sculptured Software	Atari Corp.	Unreleased	1990	
Fathom	Rob Fulop	Imagic	Imagic	August 1983	Q4 1983	
Final Approach		Apollo	Apollo	October 1982	Unknown	
Fireball (cassette)		Starpath	Starpath	August 1982	Q2 1983	
Fire Fighter	Brad Stewart	Imagic	Imagic	August 1982	Q3 1982	
Fire Fly	Bruce de Graaf	Mythicon	Mythicon	September 1983	Unknown	
Fishing Derby	David Crane	Activision	Activision	August 1980	Q3 1981	
Flag Capture; Capture_{Sears}	Jim Huether	Atari	Atari, Inc./Sears	October 1978	Unknown	
Flash Gordon	David Lubar	Sirius Software	Fox Video Games	May 1983	Unknown	
Football	Bob Whitehead	Atari	Atari, Inc./Sears	March 1979	Unknown	
Frankenstein's Monster	J. Ray Dettling	Data Age	Data Age	March 1983	Unreleased	
Freeway	David Crane	Activision	Activision	July 1981	Q1 1982	
Frogger	Ed English	Parker Bros.	Parker Brothers (Note: Licensed by Sega, distributor for Konami.)	August 1982	Q3 1982	
Frogger II: ThreeeDeep!	Mark Lesser	Parker Bros.	Parker Brothers	October 1984	Unknown	
Frogs and Flies (Frog Bog)	David Rolfe	APh	M Network; Telegames	September 1982	Q1 1984	
Front Line	Ed Temple	Individeo	Coleco (Note: Licensed by Taito.)	March 1984	Unknown	
Frostbite	Steve Cartwright	Activision	Activision	October 1983	1984	
Galaxian	Mark Ackerman, Glen Parker, Tom Calderwood	GCC	Atari, Inc. (Note: Licensed by Bally Midway, US distributor for Namco.)	April 1983	Q3 1983	
Gangster Alley		Spectravision	Spectravision	June 1982	Q1 1983	
Gas Hog		Spectravision	Spectravision	1983	Unknown	
Ghostbusters	Dan Kitchen	Activision	Activision	August 1985	Unknown	
Ghostbusters II	Michael Buetepage	Avantgarde Software	Salu Ltd (Note: Licensed by Activision.)	Unreleased	1990	
Ghost Manor		Beck-Tech	Xonox	September 1983	Q4 1983	
G.I. Joe: Cobra Strike; Action Man: Action Force^{PAL}		Parker Bros.	Parker Brothers	February 1983	Q1 1983	
Gigolo; Cathouse Blues		JHM Ltd.	Mystique; PlayAround	1983	Unknown	
Glacier Patrol	Ed Salvo	VSS	Telegames	September 1989	Unknown	
Glib		Qualtronic Devices	Selchow and Righter	September 1983	Unknown	
Golf	Mike Lorenzen	Atari	Atari, Inc./Sears	July 1980	Unknown	
Gopher	Sylvia Day	JWDA	U.S. Games; Carrere^{PAL}	January 1983	Q4 1983	
Gorf	Alex Leavens	Bally Midway	CBS Electronics	December 1982	Q4 1983	
Grand Prix	David Crane	Activision	Activision	March 1982	Q2 1982	
Gremlins	Scott Smith	Atari	Atari, Inc.	July 1984	Unknown	
Guardian	Larry Martin	Apollo	Apollo	December 1982	Unknown	
Gyruss		Roklan Software	Parker Brothers	June 1984	Unknown	
Halloween		VSS	Wizard Video	September 1983	Unknown	
Hangman; Spelling_{Sears}	Alan Miller	Atari	Atari, Inc./Sears	October 1978	Unknown	
Haunted House	James Andreasen	Atari	Atari, Inc./Sears	February 1982	Q3 1982	
H.E.R.O.	John Van Ryzin	Activision	Activision	March 1984	1984	
Home Run; Baseball_{Sears}	Bob Whitehead	Atari	Atari, Inc./Sears	October 1978	Unknown	
Human Cannonball; Cannon Man_{Sears}		Atari	Atari, Inc./Sears	March 1979	Q3 1980	
Hunt & Score; A Game of Concentration; Memory Match_{Sears}	Jim Huether	Atari	Atari, Inc./Sears	October 1978	Unknown	
Ice Hockey	Alan Miller	Activision	Activision	December 1981	Q3 1982	
Ikari Warriors	Dan Kitchen	Imagineering	Atari Corp. (Note: Licensed by SNK.)	July 1990	Unknown	
Indy 500; Race_{Sears}	Ed Riddle	Atari	Atari, Inc./Sears	September 1977	Unknown	
Infiltrate	Don Hoffman	IDSI	Apollo	September 1982	Unknown	
International Soccer (NASL Soccer)	Kevin Miller	APh	M Network; Telegames	November 1982	Unknown	
James Bond 007	Joe Gaucher	On Time Software	Parker Brothers	May 1984	Unknown	
Jawbreaker	John Harris	On-Line Systems	Tigervision	October 1982	Q2 1983	
Journey Escape	J. Ray Dettling	Data Age	Data Age	January 1983	Unreleased	
Joust	Mike Feinstein, Kevin Osborn	GCC	Atari, Inc.	October 1983	Q1 1984	
Jr. Pac-Man	Ava-Robin Cohen	GCC	Atari Corp.	October 1986	Unknown	
Jungle Hunt	Mike Feinstein, John Allred	GCC	Atari, Inc.	July 1983	Q3 1983	
Kaboom!	Larry Kaplan	Activision	Activision	July 1981	Q2 1982	
Kangaroo	Kevin Osborn	GCC	Atari, Inc. (Note: Licensed by Sun Electronics.)	July 1983	Q4 1983	
Keystone Kapers	Garry Kitchen	Activision	Activision	May 1983	Q4 1983	
Killer Satellites (cassette)		Starpath	Starpath	March 1983	Q2 1983	
King Kong		Software Electronics	Tigervision	July 1982	Q2 1983	
Klax	Steve DeFrisco	Atari	Atari Corp.	Unreleased	1990	
Knight on the Town; Lady in Wading		JHM Ltd.	Mystique; PlayAround	1983	Unknown	
Kool-Aid Man	Steve Tatsumi	Mattel	M Network	September 1983	Unknown	
Krull	Dave Staugas	Atari	Atari, Inc.	November 1983	Unknown	
Kung-Fu Master	Dan Kitchen	Imagineering	Activision (Note: Licensed by Data East, US distributor for Irem.)	September 1987	Unknown	
Laser Blast	David Crane	Activision	Activision	March 1981	Q3 1981	
Laser Gates	Dan Oliver	VentureVision	Imagic	October 1983	1984	
Lochjaw; Shark Attack	Steve Stringfellow	Apollo	Apollo	June 1982	Q4 1982	
Lock 'n' Chase	Bruce Pederson	APh	M Network; Telegames	September 1982	Q3 1983	
London Blitz	William J. Sheppard, Rebecca Heineman	Avalon Hill	Avalon Hill	June 1983	Unknown	
Lost Luggage	Ernie Runyon, Ed Salvo	Apollo	Apollo	June 1982	Q4 1982	
M.A.D.		Western Technologies	U.S. Games; Carrere^{PAL}	February 1983	Q4 1983	
Malagai			Answer Software	Q2 1983	Unknown	
Mangia'		Spectravision	Spectravision	March 1983	1984	
Marauder	Rorke Weigandt	On-Line Systems	Tigervision	October 1982	1984	
Marine Wars		Digivision	Konami; Gakken^{PAL}	1983	Unknown	
Mario Bros.	Dan Hitchens	Atari	Atari, Inc.	December 1983	1984	
M*A*S*H	Doug Neubauer	Doug Neubauer	Fox Video Games	April 1983	Q1 1984	
Master Builder		Spectravision	Spectravision	March 1983	1984	
Masters of the Universe: The Power of He-Man	Mike Sanders; Jossef Wagner	Mattel	M Network	December 1983	Unknown	
Math Gran Prix	Suki Lee	Atari	Atari, Inc./Sears	July 1982	Q3 1982	
Maze Craze: A Game of Cops 'n Robbers; Maze Mania_{Sears}	Rick Maurer	Atari	Atari, Inc./Sears	September 1980	Q1 1981	
Mega Force	Doug Neubauer	Doug Neubauer	Fox Video Games	December 1982	Q1 1984	
Megamania	Steve Cartwright	Activision	Activision	September 1982	Q4 1982	
Midnight Magic	Glenn Axworthy	Atari	Atari Corp.	November 1986	Unknown	
Millipede	Dave Staugas	GCC	Atari, Inc.	March 1984	Unknown	
Miner 2049er		Big Five Software	Tigervision	May 1983	1984	
Miner 2049er Volume II		Big Five Software	Tigervision	December 1983	Unknown	
Mines of Minos	Irwin Gaines	CommaVid	CommaVid	October 1982	Unknown	
Miniature Golf; Arcade Golf_{Sears}	Tom Reuterdahl	Atari	Atari, Inc./Sears	March 1979	Unknown	
Missile Control			Video Gems	Unreleased	Q2 1983	
Mission Survive			Video Gems	Unreleased	1983	
Missile Command	Rob Fulop	Atari	Atari, Inc./Sears	April 1981	Q2 1981	
Mogul Maniac (Note: Pack-in title for the Joyboard, a foot control pad.)			Amiga	August 1983	Unknown	
Montezuma's Revenge: Starring Panama Joe		JWDA	Parker Brothers	October 1984	Unknown	
Moon Patrol	Mark Ackerman, Noelie Alito	GCC	Atari, Inc. (Note: Licensed by Williams Electronics, US distributor for Irem.)	October 1983	Q1 1984	
Moonsweeper	Bob Smith	Imagic	Imagic	July 1983	1984	
MotoRodeo	Steve DeFrisco	Axlon	Atari Corp.	July 1990	Unknown	
Motocross Racer		Product Guild	Xonox	October 1984	Unknown	
Mountain King	Ed Salvo	VSS	CBS Electronics	December 1983	Unknown	
Mouse Trap	Sylvia Day	JWDA	Coleco; Atari Corp.	October 1982	Q3 1983	
Mr. Do!	Ed English	Individeo	Coleco (Note: Licensed by Universal Entertainment.)	September 1983	Unknown	
Mr. Do's Castle		Parker Bros.	Parker Brothers	December 1984	Unknown	
Ms. Pac-Man	Mike Horowitz, Josh Littlefield	GCC	Atari, Inc.	February 1983	Q2 1983	
My Golf	David Lubar	Imagineering	HES	Unreleased	1990	
Name This Game; Octopus^{PAL}	Sylvia Day; Rob Dubren	JWDA	U.S. Games; Carrere^{PAL}	January 1983	Q4 1983	
Night Driver	Rob Fulop	Atari	Atari, Inc./Sears	July 1980	Unknown	
No Escape!	Michael Greene	Imagic	Imagic	April 1983	Q2 1983	
Nuts			TechnoVision	Unreleased	Q4 1983	
Obelix	Suki Lee	Atari	Atari, Inc.	March 1985	1984	
Off the Wall	John Vifian	Axlon	Atari Corp.	August 1989	Unknown	
The Official Frogger (cassette)		Starpath	Starpath	September 1983	1984	
Oink!	Mike Lorenzen	Activision	Activision	April 1983	Unknown	
Omega Race		CBS Electronics	CBS Electronics	December 1983	Unknown	
Oscar's Trash Race	Christopher Omarzu	Atari	Atari, Inc.	March 1984	Unknown	
Othello	Ed Logg	Atari	Atari, Inc./Sears	March 1981	Unknown	
Outlaw; Gunslinger_{Sears}	David Crane	Atari	Atari, Inc./Sears	October 1978	Q4 1979	
Out of Control	Jim Jacob	Avalon Hill	Avalon Hill	March 1984	Unknown	
Pac-Man	Tod Frye	Atari	Atari, Inc./Sears	March 16, 1982	Q1 1982	
Party Mix (cassette)		Starpath	Starpath	October 1983	1984	
Pelé's Soccer; Championship Soccer; Soccer_{Sears}	Steve Wright	Atari	Atari, Inc./Sears	February 1981	Q1 1981	
Pengo	Mark R. Hahn	Atari	Atari, Inc. (Note: Licensed by Sega.)	May 1984	Unknown	
Pete Rose Baseball		Imagineering	Absolute Entertainment	February 1989	Unknown	
Pharaoh's Curse			TechnoVision	Unreleased	Q4 1983	
Phaser Patrol (cassette)		Starpath	Starpath	August 1982	Q2 1983	
Phoenix	Mike Feinstein, John Mracek	GCC	Atari, Inc. (Note: Licensed by Centuri, US distributor for Taito.)	February 1983	Q1 1983	
Pick 'n Pile (Note: Pick 'n' Pile on the title screen. Pick & Pile on the cartridge.)	Dennis Kiss	Salu Ltd	Salu Ltd (Note: Licensed by Ubisoft.)	Unreleased	1990	
Picnic		Western Technologies	U.S. Games	January 1983	Unknown	
Piece o' Cake		Western Technologies	U.S. Games	March 1983	Unknown	
Pigs in Space	Rob Zdybel, John Russell, Bill Aspromonte, Michael Sierchio	Atari	Atari, Inc.	November 1983	Unknown	
Pitfall!	David Crane	Activision	Activision	September 1982	Q4 1982	
Pitfall II: Lost Caverns	David Crane	Activision	Activision	March 1984	1984	
Planet Patrol		Spectravision	Spectravision	June 1982	Q1 1983	
Plaque Attack	Steve Cartwright	Activision	Activision	May 1983	Q3 1983	
Polaris		Tigervision	Tigervision	April 1983	Unknown	
Pole Position	Doug Macrae; John Allred	GCC	Atari, Inc.	August 1983	Q4 1983	
Pooyan		Konami	Konami; Gakken^{PAL}	1983	Unknown	
Popeye		Parker Bros.	Parker Brothers	September 1983	1984	
Porky's	John Simonds, Mark V. Rhoads, Randy Hyde, Winston Hendrickson	Dunhill Electronics; Lazer Microsystems	Fox Video Games	July 1983	Unknown	
Pressure Cooker	Garry Kitchen	Activision	Activision	October 1983	Unknown	
Private Eye	Bob Whitehead	Activision	Activision	March 1984	Unknown	
Q*bert		Parker Bros.	Parker Brothers (Note: Licensed by Gottlieb.); Atari Corp.	July 1983	1984	
Q*bert's Qubes		JWDA	Parker Brothers	December 1984	Unknown	
Quest for Quintana Roo		VSS	Sunrise; Telegames	1984	Unknown	
Quick Step	Dave Johnson	Imagic	Imagic	September 1983	Q4 1983	
Rabbit Transit (cassette)	Brian McGhie	Starpath	Starpath	July 1983	1984	
Racquetball	Ed Salvo	Apollo	Apollo	June 1982	Q4 1982	
Radar Lock	Doug Neubauer	Atari	Atari Corp.	August 1989	Unknown	
Raft Rider		Western Technologies	U.S. Games	1983	Unknown	
Raiders of the Lost Ark	Howard Scott Warshaw	Atari	Atari, Inc.	November 1982	Q4 1982	
Ram It	Jim Rupp	Telesys	Telesys	January 1983	Q3 1983	
Rampage	Bob Polaro	Bobco	Activision	May 1989	Unknown	
Reactor	Charlie Heath	Parker Bros.	Parker Brothers	February 1983	Q1 1983	
RealSports Baseball	Joseph Tung	Atari	Atari, Inc.	October 1982	Unknown	
RealSports Boxing	Alex DeMeo	Atari	Atari Corp.	December 1987	Unknown	
RealSports Football	Rob Zdybel	Atari	Atari, Inc.	December 1982	Unknown	
RealSports Soccer	Michael Sierchio	Atari	Atari, Inc.	April 1983	Q2 1983	
RealSports Tennis	Alan Hodgkinson	GCC	Atari, Inc.	April 1983	Q2 1983	
RealSports Volleyball	Bob Polaro	Atari	Atari, Inc.	October 1982	Q4 1982	
Rescue Terra I	Dan Oliver	VentureVision	VentureVision	December 1982	Unknown	
Revenge of the Beefsteak Tomatoes	John Russell	Fox Video Games	Fox Video Games	February 1983	Unknown	
Riddle of the Sphinx	Bob Smith	Imagic	Imagic	August 1982	Q3 1982	
River Patrol		Tigervision	Tigervision	May 1984	Unknown	
River Raid	Carol Shaw	Activision	Activision	December 1982	Q1 1983	
River Raid II	David Lubar	Imagineering	Activision	November 1988	Unknown	
Road Runner	Bob Polaro	Bobco	Atari Corp.	August 1989	Unknown	
Robin Hood		Computer Magic	Xonox	Q1 1984	1984	
Robot Tank	Alan Miller	Activision	Activision	June 1983	1984	
Roc'n Rope	Ed English	Individeo	Coleco	June 1984	Unknown	
Room of Doom	Irwin Gaines	CommaVid	CommaVid	July 1982	Q2 1983	
Save Our Ship			TechnoVision	Unreleased	Q4 1983	
Secret Quest	Steve DeFrisco	Axlon	Atari Corp.	May 1989	Unknown	
Seaquest	Steve Cartwright	Activision	Activision	February 1983	Q2 1983	
Sentinel	David Lubar	Imagineering	Atari Corp.	July 1990	Unknown	
Shootin' Gallery	Dennis Koble	Imagic	Imagic	March 1983	Unknown	
Shuttle Orbiter	Bill Hood	Avalon Hill	Avalon Hill	March 1984	Unknown	
Sir Lancelot		Product Guild	Xonox	Q1 1984	1984	
Skate Boardin': A Radical Adventure		Imagineering	Absolute Entertainment	January 1988	Unknown	
Skeet Shoot	Ed Salvo	Apollo	Apollo	December 7, 1981	Q4 1982	
Skiing	Bob Whitehead	Activision	Activision	December 1980	Q4 1981	
Sky Diver; Dare Diver_{Sears}	Jim Huether	Atari	Atari, Inc./Sears	March 1979	Unknown	
Sky Jinks	Bob Whitehead	Activision	Activision	November 1982	Unknown	
Sky Skipper		Parker Bros.	Parker Brothers	April 1983	Q2 1983	
Slot Machine; Slots_{Sears}	David Crane	Atari	Atari, Inc./Sears	March 1979	Unknown	
Slot Racers; Maze_{Sears}	Warren Robinett	Atari	Atari, Inc./Sears	October 1978	Unknown	
Smurf: Rescue in Gargamel's Castle	Henry Will IV	JWDA	Coleco	April 1983	Q3 1983	
Smurfs Save the Day (Note: Came with the Kid Vid Voice Module and three "story" cassette tapes.)			Coleco	November 1983	Unknown	
Snoopy and the Red Baron	Richard Dobbis	Atari	Atari, Inc.	November 1983	Unknown	
Sneak 'n Peek	Garry Kitchen; Paul Wilson	JWDA	U.S. Games	August 1982	Unknown	
Solar Fox	Bob Curtiss	Bally Midway	CBS Electronics	July 1983	Unknown	
Solar Storm	Dennis Koble	Imagic	Imagic	June 1983	Q2 1983	
Solaris	Doug Neubauer	Doug Neubauer	Atari Corp.	November 1986	Unknown	
Sorcerer	Bruce de Graaf	Mythicon	Mythicon	September 1983	Unknown	
Sorcerer's Apprentice	Peter C. Niday	Atari	Atari, Inc.	December 1983	Q3 1983	
Space Attack (Space Battle)	Hal Finney, Bruce Pederson	APh	M Network; Telegames	July 1982	Unknown	
Space Cavern	Dan Oliver	Apollo	Apollo	June 1982	Q4 1982	
Spacechase	Ed Salvo	Apollo	Apollo	January 1982	Q4 1982	
Space Invaders	Rick Maurer	Atari	Atari, Inc./Sears	March 1980	Q3 1980	
Space Jockey	Garry Kitchen	JWDA	U.S. Games; Carrere^{PAL}	March 1982	Q4 1983	
SpaceMaster X-7	David Lubar	Sirius Software	Fox Video Games	June 1983	Unknown	
Space Shuttle: A Journey into Space	Jessica Stevens	Woodside Design Associates	Activision	November 1983	1984	
Space War; Space Combat_{Sears}	Ian Shepard	Atari	Atari, Inc./Sears	October 1978	Q3 1978	
Spider Fighter	Larry Miller	Activision	Activision	January 1983	Q1 1983	
Spider-Man	Laura Nikolich	Parker Bros.	Parker Brothers	November 1982	Q1 1983	
Spike's Peak		Beck-Tech	Xonox	September 1983	Q4 1983	
Spitfire Attack (Note: Pack-in title for Milton Bradley's Flight Commander controller.)		Video Soft	Milton Bradley	1983	Unknown	
Springer		Tigervision	Tigervision	October 1983	Unknown	
Sprintmaster	Bob Polaro	Bobco	Atari Corp.	March 1989	Unknown	
Spy Hunter		Sega	Sega	October 1984	Unknown	
Squeeze Box		JWDA	U.S. Games	January 1983	Unknown	
Sssnake		Data Age	Data Age	October 1982	Unreleased	
Stampede	Bob Whitehead	Activision	Activision	December 1981	Q2 1982	
Star Fox	Bruce de Graaf	Mythicon	Mythicon	September 1983	Unknown	
Stargate; Defender II	Bill Aspromonte	Atari	Atari, Inc.	June 1984	Unknown	
Stargunner	Alex Leavens	Alex Leavens	Telesys	January 1983	Q3 1983	
Starmaster	Alan Miller	Activision	Activision	June 1982	Q3 1982	
Star Raiders	Carla Meninsky	Atari	Atari, Inc./Sears	September 1982	Q3 1982	
Star Ship; Outer Space_{Sears}	Bob Whitehead	Atari	Atari, Inc./Sears	September 1977	Unknown	
Star Strike	David Akers	Mattel	M Network; Telegames	June 1983	Unknown	
Star Trek: Strategic Operations Simulator		Sega	Sega	October 1983	1984	
Star Voyager	Bob Smith	Imagic	Imagic	April 1982	Q3 1982	
Star Wars: The Arcade Game		Parker Bros.	Parker Brothers	July 1984	Unknown	
Star Wars: Jedi Arena	Rex Bradford	Parker Bros.	Parker Brothers	February 1983	Q2 1983	
Star Wars Return of the Jedi: Death Star Battle		JWDA	Parker Brothers	October 1983	1984	
Star Wars: The Empire Strikes Back	Rex Bradford, Sam Kjellman	Parker Bros.	Parker Brothers	July 1982	Q4 1982	
Steeplechase	Jim Huether	Atari	Sears	March 1981	Unknown	
Steeplechase (Note: Not to be confused with the first-party game of the same name.)			Video Gems	Unreleased	1983	
Stellar Track	Rob Zdybel	Atari	Sears	March 1981	Unknown	
Strategy X		Konami	Konami; Gakken^{PAL}	1983	Unknown	
Strawberry Shortcake: Musical Match-ups	Dawn Stockbridge	Parker Bros.	Parker Brothers	April 1983	Unknown	
Street Racer; Speedway II_{Sears}	Larry Kaplan	Atari	Atari, Inc./Sears	September 1977	Q3 1978	
Stronghold	Joseph Biel	CommaVid	CommaVid	July 1983	Unknown	
Submarine Commander	Matthew Hubbard	Atari	Sears	September 1982	Unknown	
Sub-Scan		Sega	Sega	March 1983	Unknown	
Subterranea	Mark Klein	Imagic	Imagic	December 1983	Unknown	
Suicide Mission (cassette)		Starpath	Starpath	August 1982	Q2 1983	
Summer Games	Steve Baker; Tod Frye	Epyx	Epyx	October 1987	Unknown	
Super Baseball		Atari	Atari Corp.	March 1989	Unknown	
Super Breakout	Nick Turner	Atari	Atari, Inc./Sears	October 1981	Q3 1981	
Super Challenge Baseball (MLB Baseball)	David Rolfe	APh	M Network; Telegames	July 1982	Unknown	
Super Challenge Football (NFL Football)	Ken Smith	APh	M Network; Telegames	July 1982	Unknown	
Super Cobra	Mike Brodie, Bob Curtiss, Paul Crowley	Roklan Software	Parker Brothers	September 1983	1984	
Super Football	Doug Neubauer	Atari	Atari Corp.	March 1989	Unknown	
Superman	John Dunn	Atari	Atari, Inc./Sears	September 1979	Unknown	
Surfer's Paradise: But Danger Below!			Video Gems	Unreleased	Q3 1983	
Surround; Chase_{Sears}	Alan Miller	Atari	Atari, Inc./Sears	September 1977	Q3 1978	
Survival Run (Note: Pack-in title for Milton Bradley's Cosmic Commander controller.)		Renaissance Technology	Milton Bradley	1983	Unknown	
Survival Island (cassette)		Starpath	Starpath	November 1983 (Note: Only available in North America by mail order and without packaging.)	1984	
Sword of Saros (cassette)		Starpath	Starpath	November 1983	1984	
Swordquest: Earthworld	Dan Hitchens	Atari	Atari, Inc.	October 1982	Unknown	
Swordquest: Fireworld	Tod Frye	Atari	Atari, Inc.	February 1983	Unknown	
Tac-Scan		Sega	Sega	March 1983	Unknown	
Tapeworm		Spectravision	Spectravision	September 1982	Q1 1983	
Tapper		Beck-Tech	Sega	October 1984	Unknown	
Tax Avoiders	John Simonds	Dunhill Electronics	American Videogame	December 1986	Unknown	
Taz; Asterix^{PAL}	Steve Woita	Atari	Atari, Inc.	April 1984	1984	
Tennis	Alan Miller	Activision	Activision	March 1981	Q3 1981	
The Texas Chainsaw Massacre	Ed Salvo	VSS	Wizard Video	September 1983	Unknown	
Threshold	Warren Schwader	On-Line Systems	Tigervision	July 1982	Unknown	
Thunderground		Sega	Sega	September 1983	Unknown	
Time Pilot		Woodside Design Associates	Coleco	October 1983	Unknown	
Title Match Pro Wrestling		Imagineering	Absolute Entertainment	October 1987	Unknown	
Tomarc the Barbarian		Product Guild	Xonox	Q1 1984	Unknown	
Tomcat: The F-14 Fighter Simulator; Fighter Pilot^{PAL}	Dan Kitchen	Imagineering	Absolute Entertainment	February 1989	Unknown	
Towering Inferno; Infernal Tower^{PAL}	Paul Allen Newell, Jeff Corsiglia	Western Technologies	U.S. Games; Carrere^{PAL}	October 1982	1984	
Track & Field	Seth Lipkin, Jacques Hugon	GCC	Atari Corp.	July 1986	Unknown	
Treasure Below			Video Gems	Unreleased	1983	
Trick Shot	Dennis Koble	Imagic	Imagic	April 1982	Q3 1982	
Tron: Deadly Discs; Deadly Discs	Jeff Ronne, Brett Stutz	APh	M Network; Telegames	January 1983	Q1 1984	
Tunnel Runner	Dick Balaska	CBS Electronics	CBS Electronics	December 1983	Unknown	
Turmoil	Mark Turmell	Sirius Software	Fox Video Games	November 1982	Unknown	
Tutankham		Parker Bros.	Parker Brothers	June 1983	Q3 1983	
Universal Chaos			Telegames	Q3 1989	Unknown	
Up'n Down		Sega	Sega	October 1984	Unknown	
Vanguard	Dave Payne	GCC	Atari, Inc. (Note: Licensed by Centuri, US distributor for SNK.)	December 1982	Q2 1983	
Venture	Joseph Biel	CommaVid	Coleco; Atari Corp.	October 1982	Q4 1983	
Video Checkers; Checkers_{Sears}	Carol Shaw	Atari	Atari, Inc./Sears	September 1980	Q1 1982	
Video Chess	Larry Wagner, Bob Whitehead	Atari	Atari, Inc./Sears	November 1979	Unknown	
Video Jogger (Note: Pack-in title for the Foot Craz Activity Pad, a floor mat controller.)		Exus Corporation	Exus Corporation	1984	Unknown	
Video Olympics; Pong Sports_{Sears}	Joe Decuir	Atari	Atari, Inc./Sears	September 1977	Q4 1979	
Video Pinball; Arcade Pinball_{Sears}	Bob Smith	Atari	Atari, Inc./Sears	April 1981	Q3 1980	
Video Reflex		Exus Corporation	Exus Corporation	1984	Unknown	
Wabbit	Van Mai	Apollo	Apollo	October 1982	Unknown	
Wall Ball	Duncan Scott	Avalon Hill	Avalon Hill	June 1983	Unknown	
Warlords	Carla Meninsky	Atari	Atari, Inc./Sears	May 1981	Q3 1981	
Warplock		Data Age	Data Age	October 1982	Unreleased	
Wing War	Michael Greene	Imagic	Imagic	Unreleased	1984	
Winter Games	Steve Baker	Epyx	Epyx	October 1987	Unknown	
Wizard of Wor		Roklan Software	CBS Electronics	December 1982	Q2 1983	
Word Zapper	Henry Will IV	JWDA	U.S. Games	July 1982	Unknown	
Worm War I	David Lubar	Sirius Software	Fox Video Games	October 1982	Unknown	
X-Man (Note: An adult themed game unrelated to the X-Men group of superheroes.)	H.K. Poon	Universal Gamex	Universal Gamex	June 1983	Unknown	
Xenophobe		Atari	Atari Corp.	July 1990	Unknown	
Yars' Revenge	Howard Scott Warshaw	Atari	Atari, Inc./Sears	May 1982	Q2 1983	
Zaxxon			Coleco	April 1983	Q4 1983	

== Mail-order games and other limited releases ==
Game released only by special order through the mail were generally printed in extremely low numbers. In some cases, less than a dozen copies are known to exist. Other games were sold door to door, offered as a contest prize, or later rediscovered as a prototype and sold secondhand. These games are of interest to collectors but would have been generally unknown to most console owners at the time of their release.

Title	Developer (Designer)	Publisher	Release Date	Estimated No. of Copies	Notes
Air Raid	MenAVision	MenAVision	1982	12	Seemingly related to Mena Toys, a defunct toy store previously in Los Angeles.
Atari Video Cube; Rubik's Cube	GCC	Atari, Inc.	June 1983		Originally released as mail-order exclusive through the Atari Club. Later re-released as Rubik's Cube.
Atlantis II	Imagic	Imagic	October 1982	1-4	The winners of an Atlantis high score competition earned a special harder version of the game with a sticker that said Atlantis II.
Birthday Mania	Robert Anthony Tokar	Personal Games Company	August 1984	10-15	Advertised exclusively in the Newark Star-Ledger. Each copy was personalized to show the customers name.
Chase the Chuck Wagon	TMQ Software	Spectravision	October 1983		A promotion for Ralston Purina dog food sold exclusively through mail-order.
Confrontation	Answer Software	Answer Software	1983		Only originally available directly from Answer Software for a short time.
Crazy Climber	Alex Leavens	Atari, Inc.	March 1983		Mail-order exclusive through the Atari Club. Licensed by Nichibutsu.
Eli's Ladder	Simage	Simage	August 1984		An educational game released exclusively through mail order
Extra Terrestrials	Herman Quast	Skill Screen Games	Q1 1984	100	Only a handful of copies are known to exist.
Gamma-Attack	Robert L. Esken Jr.	Gammation	December 1982	1	Special order alongside the FP-1, a hardware addon to the 2600 controller that added an autofire. It was only advertised in one issue of Electronic Games.
Gauntlet	Answer Software	Answer Software	Q3 1983		Only available through mail-order.
Gravitar		Atari, Inc.	October 1983		Mail-order exclusive through the Atari Club.
MagiCard	Dr. John Bronstein	CommaVid	May 1981	50-100	A tool for teaching 6502 programming for the Atari 2600. Came with a 128 page manual.
MegaBoy		Dynacom	1986		The pack-in title to a portable clone of the Atari 2600 from Brazil, also called the MegaBoy. The cartridge is the only known 64 KB Atari 2600 game. The unlicensed console was never released nationally in Brazil, and is very rare as a result.
The Music Machine	Christian Software Development	Sparrow, HomeComputer Software	December 1983		Released exclusively through Christian bookstores.
Pepsi Invaders	Christopher Omarzu	Atari, Inc.	1983	125	A reskinned version of Space Invaders commissioned by Coca-Cola to be handed out to executives at their 1983 sales convention.
Quadrun	Steve Woita	Atari, Inc.	November 1983		Mail-order exclusive through the Atari Club.
Red Sea Crossing	Steve Schustack	Inspirational Video Concepts	October 1983	100	Only available through mail order from a magazine. 100 copies were apparently produced, but only two have been found.
Swordquest: Waterworld	Tod Frye	Atari, Inc.	October 1983		The third entry in the SwordQuest series and part of the SwordQuest competition. Due to the crash of 1983 was only initially sold via mail-order through the Atari Club. The competition never finished before Atari was sold in 1984. Copies were found on sale in toy stores in 1986.
Tooth Protectors	DSD	Camelot	August 1983		Only available to Johnson & Johnson customers who mailed in proof of purchase stamps.
Video Life	Dr. John Bronstein	CommaVid	June 1984	20	A version of Conway's Game of Life. Only available through mail-order.

=== Non-game cartridges ===
Title	Developer (Designer)	Publisher	Year	Notes
Color Bar Generator	Videosoft (Jerry Lawson)	Videosoft	December 1983	
Venetian Blinds	Activision	Activision	1982/2003	Developed in 1982, released publicly in 2003

== Games with unclear origins ==
A number of games were released by many different international publishers, often selling the same games under completely different names. Some games are graphical hacks of popular retail games, though many are unique. These were generally released outside the United States, though some were released domestically through Zimag, Panda, Ultravision, and later Froggo. In many cases the exact development details, including the original developer and publisher, remain uncertain. Those with copyright attributions generally list a date of 1983. Some Bit Corporation games list 1982, and Froggo games list 1987. This list is abridged and does not include all relevant companies.

Common Title	Region:	Western Europe						North America
Common Title	Publisher:	Goliath / Hot Shot	Home Vision		ITT Family Games	Suntek / Rainbow Vision		North America
Common Title	Also by	Ref:		Ref:	Ref:		Ref:	Ref:
Assault	Bomb	Space Raider	12	Sky Alien	Firebirds	29	Asteroid Belt	
Astrowar	Dimax	Astrowar; Missile War	2	War 2000	Meteor Defense			
Bermuda (Note: A graphical hack of Activision's River Raid.)		Ground Zero				9	Bermuda	
Bobby is Going Home	Bit Corp. (1983)	Felix Return	17	Jacky Jump; Lilly Adventure	Wilma Wanderer			
Boom Bang (Note: A graphical hack of Activision's Crackpots.)						16	Boom Bang	
Catch Time (Note: A graphical hack of Activision's Plaque Attack.)						15	Catch Time	
Challenge	Funvision							
Chase Robber			40	Chase Robber		36	Criminal Persuit	A Mysterious Thief (Zimag) (Note: Unreleased and later sold by Pleasant Valley Video as a prototype.)
Colour Fight			39	Colour Fight		25	Spectracube Invasion	Immies and Aggies (Zimag)
Condor Attack	Funvision	Galactic; Condor Attack				8	The Year 1999	Condor Attack (Ultravision)
Crazy Ski			33	Crazy Ski				
Curtiss (Note: A graphical hack of Imagic's Atlantis.)						19	Curtiss	
Dancing Plate	Bit Corp. (1982)		34	Plate Mania				Dishaster (Zimag)
Dice Puzzle	Sancho	Magic Puzzle						Dice Puzzle (Panda)
Dragon Power			16	Dragon Power		21	Dragon Defender	
The End of the World	Dimax		8	World End	Laser Base	18	Mid-Time	
Exocet	Sancho	Space Eagle						Exocet (Panda, Froggo) (Note: A game with a matching name was listed by Ultravision but never released.)
Fire Spinner			41	Fire Spinner		28	Firebug	Spinning Fireball (Zimag)
Forest	Sancho	Forest						
Frisco			4	Frisco	Peter Penguin		Suntek	
Galactic (Note: A graphical hack of Spectravision's The Challenge of Nexar.)		Black Hole				2	Galactic	
Go Go Home	Dimax		3	Go Go Home Monster	Alien's Return			
Great Escape	Bomb	Time Machine	11	Asteroid Fire				
Guignol			29	Guignol		32	Walker	
Harbor Escape								Harbor Escape (Panda)
Hey! Stop! (Note: A graphical hack of Activision's Keystone Kapers.)						12	Hey! Stop!	
Inca Gold	Funvision	Spider Kong; Pac Kong				3	Pac-Kong (Note: A graphical hack with the monster replaced with a bird.)	
IQ 180			28	IQ 180		33	I.Q. Memory Tester	
Karate	Funvision							Karate (Ultravision, Froggo)
Madcycle			38	Madcycle		22	Motocross	
Mafia (Note: A graphical hack of Spectravision's Gangster Alley.)		Mafia				10	Mafia	Task Force (Froggo)
Magic Carpet			21	Magic Carpet				
Mariana (Note: A graphical hack of Activision's Seaquest.)						17	Mariana	
Mazy Match	Datatech (Note: Included without a title on a Mexican hardware clone called the Screen Search.)							
Mission 3000 A.D.	Bit Corp. (1983)							
Mr. Postman	Bit Corp. (1983)							
Netmaker (Note: A graphical hack of Parker Brothers' Amidar.)						6	Netmaker	Spiderdroid (Froggo)
Nightmare	Sancho	Dream Flight						Stuntman (Panda)
Open Sesame	Bit Corp. (1982)	Tom Boy	37	Teddy Apple				I Want My Mommy (Zimag)
Panda Chase			5	Panda Chase		35	Panda (Quest)	
Parachute			23	Parachute		30	Skydiver	
Phantom Tank	Bit Corp. (1982)	Labrinth	35	Tanks War				Tanks but no Tanks (Zimag); Tank Brigade (Panda)
Pumuckl at the Farm House			22	Pumuckl at the Farm House	Pmucki I	31	Farmyard Fun	
Pumuckl at the Zoo			31	Pumuckl at the Zoo		27	Zoo Fun	
Pyramid War (Note: A graphical hack of Activision's Chopper Command.)						4	Pyramid War	
Racing Car			24	Racing Car	Hell Driver			
Robin			10	Robin				
Sea Monster	Bit Corp. (1982)	Sea Master						
Seahawk	Sancho	Overkill						Sea Hawk (Panda, Froggo)
Ski Hunt			6	Ski Hunt	Mountain Man	24	Ski Run	
Skindiver	Sancho	Skin Diver				13	Bi! Bi!	Scuba Diver (Panda); Sea Hunt (Froggo)
Snail Against Squirrel	Bit Corp. (1983)	Squirrel & Snail						
Space Canyon (Note: A graphical hack of Apollo's Space Cavern.)								Space Canyon (Panda)
Space Raid (Note: A graphical hack of Activision's Megamania.)						7	Space Raid	
Space Robot	Dimax	Space Robot	1	Robot Fight				
Space Tunnel	Bit Corp. (1982)	Space Tunnel	36	Cosmic War				Cosmic Corridor (Zimag)
Super Ferrari (Note: A graphical hack of Activision's Enduro.)						11	Super Ferrari	
Tennis (Note: A graphical hack of Activision's Tennis)			7	Tennis				
Time Race (Note: A graphical hack of U.S. Games' Space Jockey.)		Time Race				1	Time Race	
Time Warp	Funvision	Astro Attack						
Tom Boy (Note: A graphical hack of Activision's Pitfall!.)						5	Tom Boy	
Topy			26	Topy		23	Mole Hunter	
Treasure Discovery			20	Treasure Discovery		26	Treasure Island	
Tuby Bird (Note: A graphical hack of Activision's Dolphin.)						20	Tuby Bird	
Wall-Defender	Bomb	Capture	14	Wall Break				
Whales			25	Whales				
Words Attack	Sancho							
X'Mission			18	X'Mission		31	UFO Patrol	
Z-Tack	Bomb	Sky Scraper	13	Base Attack	Cosmic Town			

== Multi-game cartridges ==
Atari released one official multicart for the Atari 2600 in the 1980s in PAL regions only. They have also released several multicarts starting in the 2020s, primarily consisting of reissued games.

Title	Games included	Year	Notes	CX Number
4 Games in 1	Breakout, Canyon Bomber, Night Driver, Video Olympics	November 2023	A compilation included with the CX30+ Paddle Controller Bundle released in 2023. Two paddle controllers are also included with the cartridge.	CX 26501
10 Games in 1	Adventure, Combat, Dodge 'Em, Haunted House, Maze Craze, Missile Command, RealSports Volleyball, Surround, Video Pinball, Yars' Revenge	November 2023	A compilation included as the pack-in game for the Atari 2600+.	CX 26500
32 in 1	3-D Tic-Tac-Toe, Air-Sea Battle, Ant Party (Cosmic Swarm), Blackjack, Basketball, Bowling, Boxing, Combat, Checkers, Flag Capture, Fishing (Fishing Derby), Fishing Derby, Football, Freeway, Freeway Chicken (Freeway), Freeway Rabbit (Freeway), Fun with Numbers, Golf, Home Run, Human Cannonball, Laser Blast, Miniature Golf, Outlaw, Reversi (Othello), Slot Machine, Slot Racers, Skiing, Sky Diver, Space War, Stampede, Surround, Tennis, UFO (Space Jockey)	1988	A PAL-only compilation compatible with the Atari 7800. 32 games are included, including games by Atari, Inc., Activision, CommaVid, and U.S. Games.	CX 26163
Epyx Games Collection	Summer Games, Winter Games, California Games	August 2024	A compilation of sports games from Epyx.	CX 26504
M Network Collection	Astroblast, Armor Ambush, Frogs & Flies, Star Strike	August 2024	A compilation of M Network games.	CX 26506
RealSports Collection	RealSports Baseball, RealSports Football, RealSports Volleyball, RealSports Tennis, RealSports Boxing, RealSports Basketball	August 2024	A compilation of the RealSports games including the initially unreleased RealSports Basketball.	CX 26505

=== Xonox double-sided cartridges ===
Xonox released many of their games as "2-in-1" cartridges, with one game on each side. All such games were also available individually.

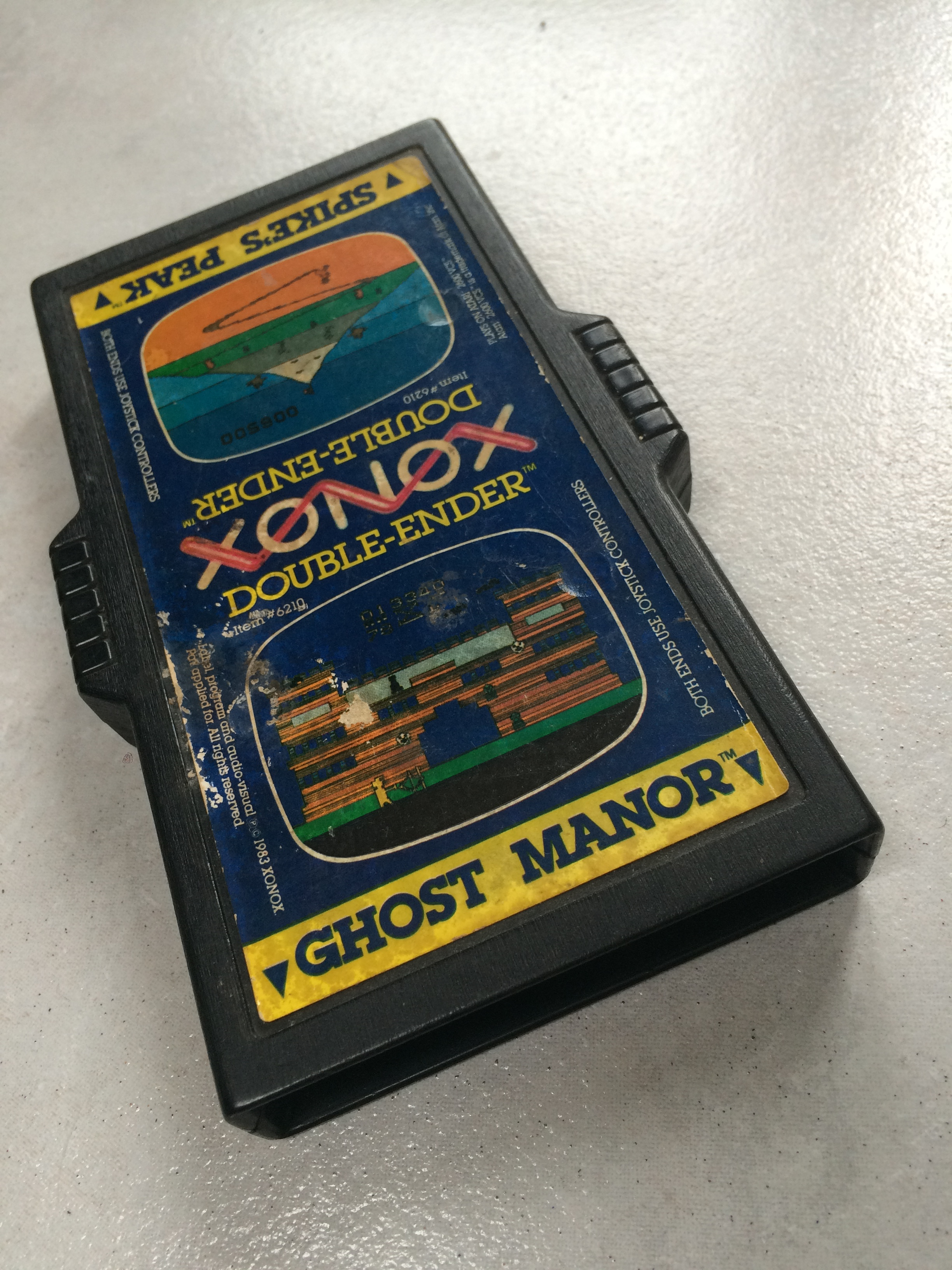
A double ender cartridge of Ghost Manor/Spike's Peak

Title	Developer (Designer)	Publisher	Year	Genre
Artillery Duel/Chuck Norris Superkicks	Xonox	Xonox	November 1983	Strategy
Artillery Duel/Ghost Manor	Xonox	Xonox	1983	Strategy
Artillery Duel/Spike's Peak	Xonox	Xonox	1983	Strategy
Chuck Norris Superkicks/Ghost Manor	Xonox	Xonox	1983	Action
Chuck Norris Superkicks/Spike's Peak	Xonox	Xonox	1983	Action
Ghost Manor/Spike's Peak	Xonox	Xonox	September 1983	Action
Robin Hood/Sir Lancelot - The Joust	Computer Magic, Ltd.	Xonox	Q2 1984	Action

=== PlayAround double-sided cartridges ===
PlayAround was an American company formed to republish pornographic games previously released under the Mystique label, also known as the "Swedish Erotica" series. These games were released on double ended cartridges, similar to the ones sold by Xonox. Each of the six Mystique games has a gender swapped equivalent, with each character swapped to one of the opposite gender. These are mixed and matched with each other to form six pairs of twelve games. The General Re-Treat/Westward Ho cartridge (Custer's Revenge and it's gender swapped equivalent) was never released in the United States, possibly due to large public outcry over the game's themes.

Title	Developer	Publisher	Year	Gender-swapped titles	
Title	Developer	Publisher	Year	A	B
Bachelor Party/Gigolo	JHM Ltd.	PlayAround	1983	Bachelorette Party	Cathouse Blues
Beat 'Em & Eat 'Em/Lady in Wading	JHM Ltd.	PlayAround	1983	Philly Flasher	Knight on the Town
Burning Desire/Bachelorette Party	JHM Ltd.	PlayAround	1983	Jungle Fever	Bachelor Party
General Re-Treat/Westward Ho	JHM Ltd.	PlayAround	1983	Westward Ho	General Re-Treat
Jungle Fever/Knight on the Town	JHM Ltd.	PlayAround	1983	Burning Desire	Lady in Wading
Philly Flasher/Cathouse Blues	JHM Ltd.	PlayAround	1983	Beat 'Em & Eat 'Em	Gigolo

== Prototypes ==
Games that were completed to some degree but never commercially released by their publisher are referred to as prototypes. Some were rediscovered and given limited public releases by their developers, collectors, or other third-parties. Others were officially released for the Atari Flashback consoles.

Title	Developer	Intended Publisher	Copyright year	Released by	Release Date	Notes
Actionauts	Rob Fulop	Imagic	1983	Rob Fulop	2007	The last game Fulop worked on before leaving Atari for Imagic. After leaving Imagic, he continued developing the idea but never released it. It was later sold by Fulop on his website.
Aquaventure		Atari, Inc.	1983	AtGames	August 2005	Included in Atari Flashback 2 and beyond. Also released as part of a free update for Atari 50: The Anniversary Celebration.
Bugs Bunny	Bob Polaro	Atari, Inc.	1983	Atari2600.com	April 2002	The developer sold signed copies at the game expo PhillyClassic 3.
Cat Trax	UA Limited	UA Limited	1983	RGA International; AtariAge	2003	Port of a maze chase game for the Arcadia 2001. Found included inside special marked versions of a cart selector called the Video Game Brain peripheral Later published by AtariAge in 2003.
Combat Two	GCC	Atari, Inc.	1982	Retrodesign; AtGames	August 2001	Sold in limited quantities at Classic Gaming Expo 2001. Included in Atari Flashback 2 and beyond.
Crack'ed		Atari Corp.	1988	GCE Services	August 2002	Released for the Atari ST and 7800. Sold in limited quantities at Classic Gaming Expo 2002.
Cubicolor	Rob Fulop	Imagic	1982	Rob Fulop	December 1986	Fulop sold 10 in December 1986 through The Video Game Update, and 50 more c. 1994 through 2600 Connection.
Donald Duck's Speedboat	Suki Lee	Atari, Inc.	1983		Unknown	Based on a license from Disney. Review copies were sent out but the game was never released by Atari. Versions of the game have been found in Brazil.
Elevator Action	Dan Hitchens	Atari, Inc.	1983	GCE Services	August 2001	Based on the Taito arcade game. Sold in limited quantities at Classic Gaming Expo 2001.
Frog Pond		Atari, Inc.	1982	Best Electronics; AtGames	August 2005	Similar to Frog Bog, review copies were sent out but the game was never shipped. It was at one time sold by Best Electronics. Included in Atari Flashback 2 and beyond.
Funky Fish	UA Limited	UA Limited	1983	AtariAge	2003	Port of an arcade game by Sunsoft, also released for the Arcadia 2001. Released by AtariAge in 2003.
Holey Moley	Bob Polaro	Atari, Inc.	1983	Atari2600.com	August 2002	A version of Whac-A-Mole built to work with an oversized controller called the Kid's Controller. Sold in limited quantities at Classic Gaming Expo 2002.
Off Your Rocker	Video Soft	Amiga	1983	Pleasant Valley Video	1991	Simon-style game that was completed shortly before Amiga abandoned the Atari 2600 market. Developed by Jerry Lawson's Video Soft along with other unreleased Amiga games. Eventually sold by Pleasant Valley Video, who created packaging and labels and released them to the public.
Pick-Up	Mark Klien	Fox Video Games	1983	GCE Services	August 2002	A softcore adult game. Sold in limited quantities at Classic Gaming Expo 2002.
Pizza Chef		Zimag	1983	Pleasant Valley Video	1991	Sold by CCE in Brazil, a company that mainly sold pirated cartridges. Also sold by Pleasant Valley Video in the US.
Pleiades	UA Limited	UA Limited	1983	AtariAge	2003	Port of the Tecmo arcade game, also released for the Arcadia 2001. Released by AtariAge in 2003.
Polo	Carol Shaw	Atari, Inc.	1978	Carol Shaw	April 2002	Created to promote a cologne named "Polo" by Ralph Lauren. The developer released a version at the game expo PhillyClassic 3.
RealSports Basketball	Joe Gaucher	Atari, Inc.	1983	Retrodesign; AtGames	August 2002	Part of the RealSports series. Sold in limited quantities at Classic Gaming Expo 2002. Included in Atari Flashback 3 and beyond.
Revenge of the Apes		Fox Video Games	1983	Retrodesign	2003	Inspired by the Planet of the Apes movies. Finished and released in 2003.
Saboteur	Howard Scott Warshaw	Atari, Inc.	1983	Howard Scott Warshaw; AtGames	March 2004	A multi-screen game with three different gameplay modes. The developer released a version the game expo PhillyClassic 5. Included in the original Atari Flashback and beyond.
Save Mary	Tod Frye (Axlon)	Atari Corp.	1990	AtGames	August 2005	Included in Atari Flashback 2 and beyond. Also released as part of a free update for Atari 50: The Anniversary Celebration.
Save the Whales	Steve Beck	Fox Video Games	1983	GCE Services	August 2002	Intended to benefit Greenpeace. Sold in limited quantities at Classic Gaming Expo 2002.
Sea Battle	APh	M Network	1983	Intellivision Productions; AtGames	July 2000	Originally released for the Intellivision. Sold in limited quantities at Classic Gaming Expo 2000. Included in Atari Flashback 5 through 8.
Secret Agent		Data Age	1983	Atari2600.com	August 2001	A game similar to Kaboom! designed to use the paddle controllers. Sold in limited quantities at Classic Gaming Expo 2001.
Snow White and the Seven Dwarfs		Atari, Inc.	1983	Retrodesign	August 2002	Developed based on Disney's Snow White and the Seven Dwarfs. Sold incomplete and in limited quantities at Classic Gaming Expo 2002.
Stone Age		TechnoVision	1983	CCE		Sold by CCE in Brazil, a company that mainly sold pirated cartridges.
Sword Fight		M Network	1983	Intellivision Productions; Sword Fight	July 2000	A sword fighting game with a side-on perspective. Sold in limited quantities at Classic Gaming Expo 2000. Included in Atari Flashback 5 through 8.
Tempest		Atari, Inc.	1984	AtGames	November 2012	Based on the arcade game. Included in Atari Flashback 4 and beyond.
Wizard	Chris Crawford	Atari, Inc.	1984	AtGames	August 2005	Included in Atari Flashback 2 and beyond.

== Homebrew games ==
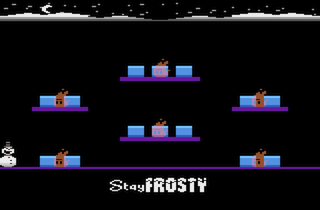
Stay Frosty by Darrell Spice Jr.

The Atari 2600 has been a popular platform for homebrew projects. Unlike later systems, the Atari 2600 does not require a modchip to run cartridges. Many games are clones of existing games written as programming challenges, often borrowing the name of the original.

In 2003, Activision selected several games for inclusion in the Game Boy Advance version of their Activision Anthology, as indicated below. Homebrew games have also been published by licensed divisions of Atari SA including: AtGames (the manufacturers of the Atari Flashback consoles), AtariAge (which started out as an independent fansite but has been owned by Atari SA since 2023), and Atari themselves in support of the Atari 2600+.

Title	Developer(s)	Publisher(s)	Release Date	Notes
2005 Minigame Multicart	Chris Walton, Fred Quimby, Bob Montgomery, and Zach Matley	AtariAge	2005	
2048 2600	Carlos Duarte do Nascimento (chesterbr)	Self-published	2014	Clone of 2048
A-VCS-tec Challenge	Simon Quernhorst (Programmer), Paul Slocum (Music)	AtariAge	2006	Clone of Aztec Challenge
Aardvark	Óscar Toledo G. and Thomas Jentzsch and Nathan Strum	AtariAge	2019	Variation of Anteater
Adventure II	Curt Vendel	AtGames	2005	Released for the Atari Flashback 2 and beyond. Also released as part of a free update for Atari 50: The Anniversary Celebration.
Alfred Challenge	Eric Bacher	Ebivision	1998	Platform-and-ladder game
Allia Quest	Igor Barzilai	Ebivision	2001	Fixed shooter
Alien Greed	Chris Read	Self-Published	2007	
Alien Greed 2	Scott Dayton	Neo Games	2008	
Alien Greed 3	Chris Read	Neo Games	2010	
Alien Greed 4	Chris Read	2600Connection	2012	
Alien Holocaust	Fernando Rodrigues Salvio	Bitnamic	2022	Based on the short film Alien Holocaust by Marcus Garrett and the developer, as the character Bruce. It has a cartridge version and another sold with the DVD of the short film.
Alien Holocaust 2: Invasion Earth	Fernando Rodrigues Salvio	Bitnamic	2023	Sequel to Alien Holocaust. In command of flying saucers, the player can destroy cities all over the world, being the first Atari game to graphically represent cities in Brazil, North America, Europe, Asia, and Egypt. With soundtrack by Pedro Pimenta. It has a special version with a flying saucer-shaped packaging.
Arcade Pong		AtGames	2005	A rendition of the arcade game, included in the Atari Flashback 2. Not to be confused with Video Olympics.
Asteroids Deluxe	Curt Vendel	AtGames	2005	Released for the Atari Flashback 2. Later included in Atari Flashback 9 and beyond.
Astronomer	Alex Pietrow	Packrat	2018	An astronomy simulator where the player can use a telescope to observe stars. It is a pack in-game for the Retron 77.
Avalanche	John Champeau	Champ Games	2007	Released by Atari for the Atari 2600+ in 2025.
Bee-Ball	Ivan Machado	AtariAge	2007	
Bell Hopper	Tomas Härdin	Self-published	2011	A demake of Winterbells. Placed fifth in the game development competition at Assembly Summer 2011.
Berzerk (Enhanced Edition)	Mike Mika	Atari	November 2023	An enhanced version of the 2600 original, released for the Atari 2600+, with voices and more accurate level design.
Bigfoot Family Search	Jason Santuci and Bobby Alexander		2016	
Boulder Dash	Thomas Jentzsch and Andrew Davie	AtariAge	2011	
Caverns of Mars		AtGames	2005	A rendition of the Atari 8-bit computer game, included in the Atari Flashback 2. Removed from later editions for legal reasons.
Caverns of Mars	John Champeau	Atari	2024	Released for the Atari 2600+. According to Atari, the "first-ever release of Caverns of Mars on the 2600 platform"
Chase It!	Alan W. Smith	AtGames	2010	Included in Atari Flashback 5 and beyond.
Chetiry	Chris Walton, Zach Matley, Fred Quimby	AtariAge	2012	Tetris clone. Melody Enhanced.
Circus Convoy	Audacity Games	Audacity Games	2021	First game from publisher founded by David Crane, Garry Kitchen and Dan Kitchen.
Climber 5	Dennis Debro	XYPE	2003	Based on a computer game printed in Compute! magazine. Included in the Activision Anthology. Included in the Atari Flashback 2 as Atari Climber. Later included in Atari Flashback 6 and beyond.
Conquest of Mars	Champ Games (John W. Champeau)	AtariAge	2006	Clone of the Atari 8-bit computer game Caverns of Mars.
Dark Mage	Greg Troutman	AtariAge	1997	
Draconian	SpiceWare (Darrell Spice, Jr.) Additional programming by Chris Walton. Music, Speech, Sound Effects by Michael Haas	AtariAge	2017	Clone of Arcade game Bosconian, Draconian includes levels from both arcade versions (Namco and Midway), plus original levels.
Dungeon	David Weavil	AtariAge	2009	
Dungeon II: Solstice	David Weavil	AtariAge	2019	
Duck Attack!	Will Nicholes	AtariAge	2010	Loosely based on Adventure.
Edtris 2600	Ed Federmeyer	Hozer Video Games	1995	Clone of Tetris.
Escape It!	Alan W. Smith	AtGames	2009	Included in Atari Flashback 5 and beyond.
Euchre	Erik Eid	Self-published	2002	Included in the Activision Anthology as Video Euchre
Fall Down	Aaron Curtis	AtariAge	2005	
FlapPing	Kirk Israel	AtariAge	2004	
Four-Play	Zach Matley	AtariAge	2006	
Galactopus!	Ric Pryor	AtariAge	2015	
Galagon	John W. Champeau, Nathan Strum, Ross Keenum	AtariAge	2019	Supports AtariVox/Savekey for saving high scores.
Grizzards	Bruce-Robert Pocock, Zephyr Salz	AtariAge	2022	Supports AtariVox for voice. Contains save-to-cartridge circuitry on physical release, or uses AtariVox/Savekey for demo/download version.
Go Fish!	Bob Montgomery	AtariAge	2005	
Gunfight	Manuel Rotschkar	XYPE	2001	
Halo 2600	Ed Fries	AtariAge	2010	Based on Bungie's Halo series, Fries was involved in Microsoft's acquisition of Bungie.
Heist	Timothy Marsh	Self-published	2019	
High Score Screen Burn Slow Burn	BJ Best	8bitclassics.com	2010	High Score Screen Burn Slow Burn: The game that’s maybe not a game!
Hunchy II	Chris Walton	AtariAge	2005	
Jammed	Thomas Jentzsch	XYPE	2001	
Juno First	Chris Walton	AtariAge	2009	Clone of arcade game of the same name.
Jatai the Bee	Fernando Rodrigues Salvio	Bitnamic	2024	The Jataí is a bee native to the Atlantic Forest and must fulfill its duty of pollinating flowers and collecting pollen and nectar to feed the hive. During the mission, some enemies will appear: spiders, which hang from the web; lemon bees, which raid the hive; and also a large spider, the Queen, who must be stopped. The game has a box with a 3D printed bee that serves as a key to open it.
K.O. Cruiser	Devin Cook	AtariAge	2010	
Kovi Kovi	Mashdy Games	AtariAge	2024	
L.E.M. Lunar Excursion Module	Filippo Santellocco	AtariAge	2010	Inspired by arcade game Lunar Lander.
Lady Bug	Champ Games (John W. Champeau)	AtariAge	2006	Clone of arcade game of the same name.
Lunar Lander		AtGames	2005	A rendition of the arcade game, included in the Atari Flashback 2.
Mappy	John W. Champeau, Mike Haas, Thomas Jentzsch	AtariAge	2019	Clone of arcade game of the same name, AtariVox Enhanced.
Marble Craze	Paul Slocum	XYPE	2002	
Mean Santa	John K. Harvey	2600 Connection	2009	
Medieval Mayhem	SpiceWare (Darrell Spice Jr.)	AtariAge	2006	Remake of Warlords that adds arcade features missing from the original home version.
Miss It!	Alan W. Smith	AtGames	2009	Included in Atari Flashback 5 and beyond.
Monkey King	Alex Pietrow		2018	Strategic endless runner.
Mr. Run and Jump	John Mikula (Graphite Lab)	Atari	November 2023	Also released for PC, PS4, PS5, Xbox Series X, and Nintendo Switch.
Okie Dokie	Bob Colbert	Retroware	1996	Included in the Activision Anthology.
Oystron	Piero Cavina	XYPE	1997/1998	Included in the Activision Anthology.
Pesco	Eric Bacher	Ebivision	1999	
PitKat	Mashdy Games	AtariAge	2020	Clone of Pitman
Pressure Gauge	John K. Harvey	Self-published	1999	
Princess Rescue	Chris Spry	AtariAge	2013	Clone of Super Mario Bros.
Return to Haunted House	Anthony Wong	AtGames	2005	A sequel to Haunted House. Included in Atari Flashback 2 and beyond. Also released as part of a free update for Atari 50: The Anniversary Celebration.
Qb	Andrew Davie	XYPE	2001	
Scramble	John W. Champeau (Champ Games)	AtariAge	2016	Clone of arcade game of the same name.
Seawolf	Manuel Rotschkar	XYPE	2004	
Shield Shifter	John Reder	Good Deal Games	2009	Included in Atari Flashback 5 and beyond.
Skeleton+	Eric Ball	AtariAge	2003	Included in the Activision Anthology.
Snappy	Sebastian Mihai	Self-published	2012	
Sound X	Ed Federmeyer	Hozer Video Games	1994	
Space Duel		AtGames	2005	A rendition of the arcade game, included in the Atari Flashback 2.
Space Game	Karl Garrison, Maggie Vogel	AtariAge	2018	AtariVox Enhanced.
Space Raid	Óscar Toledo Gutiérrez	CollectorVision	2014	Included in Atari Flashback 9 Gold and beyond.
Space Rocks	Darrell Spice, Jr.	AtariAge	2013	AtariVox Enhanced.
Space Treat Deluxe	Fabrizio Zavagli	AtariAge	2003	Included in the Activision Anthology
Space Instigators	Christopher Tumber	XYPE	2002	
Squish 'Em	Bob Montgomery	AtariAge	2007	Clone of Atari 8-bit computer game of the same name.
The Stacks	Mike Mika and Kevin Wilson	Parzavision	2011	Pitfall!-like game based on a fictional homebrew mentioned in the novel Ready Player One and made downloadable at Stacks as part of a contest to win a DMC DeLorean
Star Fire	Manuel Rotschkar, Thomas Jentzsch	XYPE	2003	Clone of arcade game of the same name.
Stay Frosty	SpiceWare (Darrell Spice Jr.)	AtariAge	2007	Also included on 2007 AtariAge Holiday Cart: Stella's Stocking
Stay Frosty 2	SpiceWare (Darrell Spice Jr.)	AtariAge	2014	
Stell-A-Sketch/Okie Dokie	Bob Colbert	Retroware	1997	
Strat-O-Gems Deluxe	John Payson	AtariAge	2005	
Strip Off	John Reder	Good Deal Games	2009	Inspired by the arcade game Rip Off. Included in Atari Flashback 5 and beyond.
Super Cobra Arcade	Champ Games (John W. Champeau)	AtariAge	2017	Clone of arcade game Super Cobra
SWOOPS!	Thomas Jentzsch	AtariAge	2005	
Synthcart	Paul Slocum	AtariAge	2002	Keyboard controllers are used to create sound loops
Thrust	Thomas Jentzsch	XYPE	2000	Clone of computer game of same name. Re-released with enhancements in 2002 as Thrust+ DC Edition and in 2003 as Thrust+ Platinum
Toyshop Trouble	John Payson, Zach Matley, Bob Montgomery, Thomas Jentzsch, Nathan Strum	AtariAge	2007	Also released in 2006 as 2006 AtariAge Holiday Cart: Toyshop Trouble
Turbo	AtariAge	AtariAge	2010	Clone of arcade game of the same name.
Vault Assault	Brian Prescott	Self-published	2001	Included in the Activision Anthology
Vong	Rick Skrbina	Self-published	2008	
Wall Jump Ninja	Walaber	AtariAge	2015	Supports the AtariVox
Warring Worms	Baroque Gaming (Billy Eno)	AtariAge	2002	Expanded and re-released in 2005 as Warring Worms: The Worm (Re)Turns
The Wicked Father	Juno (Jamie Hamshere)	Self-published	2011	
Yars' Return	Dennis Debro	AtGames	2005	Initially released for the Atari Flashback 2, and intended as a sequel to Yars' Revenge. Later released through the Atari XP label.
Zippy the Porcupine	Chris Spry	AtariAge	2015	Game based on Sonic the Hedgehog
Zoo Keeper	Champ Games (John W. Champeau)	AtariAge	2021	Clone of arcade game of the same name.

== See also ==
- Atari Flashback
- List of best-selling Atari 2600 video games
- Lists of video games
- List of GameLine games for the Atari 2600
- Category:Cancelled Atari 2600 games
