= Knight on the Town =

1983 adult video game for the Atari 2600

- Publisher: PlayAround
- Platform: Atari 2600
- Release: 1983
- Genre: Action

Knight on the Town is a pornographic video game for the Atari 2600, published by PlayAround in 1983. It was one of several games released by the company following the restructuring of J.H.M., the parent company of the adult developer Mystique.

The game was released on a "double-ended" cartridge, a hardware format where a different game was playable on each side of the physical unit; Knight on the Town was specifically paired with the title Jungle Fever. The game was a part of PlayAround's line of adult titles, and as a counterpart to the gender-swapped Lady in Wading.

== Gameplay ==
Atari 2600 screenshot

Knight on the Town is an action video game. The object is to rescue a princess held captive in a castle tower as quickly as possible. The player controls a knight who builds a bridge across a moat while avoiding hazards including a beast, a crocodile, and, in the more difficult variation, a dragon that drops fireballs. The manual notes that the player has unlimited turns, because the game is played against the clock. Once the bridge is completed, the knight reaches the balcony to receive a reward, after which the player moves the joystick vertically to accumulate points and stop the timer.

== Release and legacy ==
In late 1983, Personal Computer World advertised Knight on the Town and Jungle Fever as one of six PlayAround 2-in-1 cartridges then available. In a 1999 retrospective on erotic Atari games, Salon described Knight on the Town as a "bawdy medieval romp" and noted its bridge-building premise.

In 2007, Flow discussed Knight on the Town and its counterpart Lady in Wading as examples of PlayAround's strategy to reuse game assets. While released on different physical cartridges, the two titles featured nearly identical gameplay mechanics with swapped character sprites to target male and female audiences respectively. Kotaku later summarized the game as a rescue scenario built around constructing a bridge across a moat while dodging hazards. Modern critics note the game for its primitive graphics, and the absurdity of the "adult" rewards presented in such a low-resolution graphic format.

== See also ==
- Bachelor Party
- Beat 'Em & Eat 'Em
- Custer's Revenge
- Gigolo
