= Gigolo (video game) =

1982 Atari 2600 adult video game

- Developer: American Multiple Industries
- Publishers: American Multiple Industries (Mystique); PlayAround
- Programmer: Joel H. Martin
- Platform: Atari 2600
- Release: 1982
- Genres: Adult, memory
- Mode: Single-player

Gigolo on the Atari 2600

Gigolo is a pornographic video game released in 1982 for the Atari 2600. It was published by American Multiple Industries under its Mystique label, and was later distributed by PlayAround. In North America, the game was issued on a "2-in-1" cartridge paired with Bachelor Party. A gender swapped version was released by PlayAround titled Cathouse Blues, it was packaged as a double ended cartridge with Philly Flasher.

== Gameplay ==
Gigolo is a memory game in which the player controls a woman navigating a neighborhood of twelve houses. At the start of the game, seven men leave the jail and enter separate houses, and the player must remember which locations are occupied. To enter a house, the player must first collect money from an instant teller, which pays out in $55 increments, up to a maximum of $220. Entering a "den" costs $20. If the player carries more than $100, a mugger emerges from the jail and begins pursuing her.

Entering an occupied house shifts the game to a bedroom scene, where points are scored by moving the joystick up and down. Entering an empty house, re-entering a previously used house, or failing to have enough money leaves the player temporarily vulnerable while police can chase. The player can run by pressing the joystick button, though police begin chasing again after a short delay. Remaining turns are indicated by symbols at the top of the screen, and one is lost each time the player is busted.

== Development ==
Joel H. Martin is credited as the programmer. After American Multiple Industries exited the video game business, the remaining Mystique titles were folded into the PlayAround line. In retrospective coverage, Kotaku described Gigolo and Cathouse Blues as sharing the same core gameplay as gender-swapped counterparts within that expanded line.

== Reception ==
In retrospective coverage, Gigolo has generally been noted as part of PlayAround's broader line of adult Atari 2600 games, rather than as a major standalone release. Kotaku described it as a "stealthy game of memory", while the Houston Press discussed it as one of PlayAround's gender-swapped counterparts to its male-led adult games, comparing it directly to Cathouse Blues.

== See also ==
- Bachelor Party
- Beat 'Em & Eat 'Em
- Custer's Revenge
