= Bachelor party (disambiguation) =

A bachelor party is a party held for a man who is about to be married (for woman, see bachelorette party).

Bachelor party may also refer to:

- The Bachelor Party, a 1957 film
- Bachelor Party (1984 film), an American comedy film
- Bachelor Party 2: The Last Temptation, a 2008 American comedy film, sequel to the 1984 film
- Bachelor Party (2012 film), an Indian Malayalam-language film
- Bachelor Party (2024 film), an Indian Kannada-language comedy film
- "Bachelor Party" (Angel), an episode of the TV series Angel
- "Bachelor Party" (How I Met Your Mother), an episode of the TV series How I Met Your Mother
- Bachelor Party (video game), a 1983 adult-themed video game for the Atari 2600
