= Slot Machine (video game) =

1979 video game

- Cover art by John Enright
- Developer(s): Atari, Inc.
- Publisher(s): Atari, Inc.
- Programmer(s): David Crane
- Platform(s): Atari 2600
- Release: NA: March 1979
- Genre(s): Slot machine
- Mode(s): Single-player, multiplayer

Slot Machine is a 1979 video game written by David Crane for the Atari VCS (renamed to the Atari 2600 in 1982) and published by Atari, Inc. Along with Star Ship and Miniature Golf, it was one of the first Atari VCS games to be discontinued.

== Gameplay ==
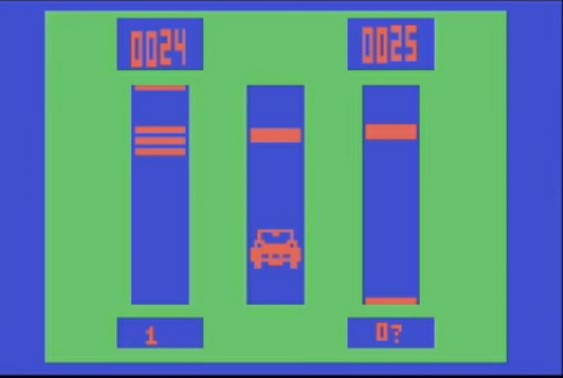
Gameplay screenshot

The game has one-player and two-player modes. Gameplay options include Jackpot and Payoff modes. The game continues until the player runs out of tokens.

== Development ==
The game was written by David Crane, who went on to develop Pitfall!. Crane developed the game for his mother, who was a lover of slot-machine games. Programming the game to represent the different symbols of a traditional fruit-machine proved difficult given that the Atari 2600 could only render 8 monochrome pixels for each sprite, so Crane made use of differing shapes that were easily distinguishable, such as cacti.

== Reception ==
In a July 1983 review in Electronic Games magazine, Joyce Worley and Tracie Forman described the graphics as "workman-like if unspectacular".

A December 2000 review of the game in Classic Gamer Magazine written by Leonard Herman was highly critical of the game, including it in a list of games that he "loved to hate" and criticising the lack of tension in the gameplay and the poor graphics.

== See also ==
- List of Atari 2600 games
