= Flight commander (disambiguation) =

A flight commander is the leader of a flight of military aircraft or the commander of a ground-based flight.

Flight commander may also refer to:

- In the Royal Naval Air Service, the appointment held by a lieutenant commanding a flight.
- The Flight Commander (film), a 1927 silent feature from Gaumont British
- "The Flight Commander", a 1928 short story by John Monk Saunders
- The Dawn Patrol (1930 film), retitled Flight Commander in 1938
- Flight Commander, an amusement park ride that ran from 1990 to 1995 at Kings Island
- Flight Commander, an Atari 2600 controller in the Power Arcade series from Milton Bradley
