= Star Fox (disambiguation) =

Star Fox is a video game series by Nintendo.

Star Fox may also refer to:

== Video games ==
=== Star Fox series ===
- Star Fox (1993 video game), also known as Starwing in Europe and Australia, the first game in the series, released on the Super Nintendo Entertainment System
- Star Fox (2026 video game), Nintendo Switch 2 game
- Star Fox team, the game series' titular fictional mercenary team
- Fox McCloud, the main character of the series, sometimes colloquially referred to as "Star Fox"

=== Other games ===
- Star Fox (1983 video game), a 1983 video game for the Atari 2600
- Starfox (1987 video game), a home computer game also known as The Rubicon Alliance, by Reaktor Software

== Other uses ==
- Starfox (character), a Marvel Comics superhero
- The Star Fox, a 1965 science fiction novel by author Poul Anderson
- Xingxing Fox (translated as Star Fox), a Chinese children's animated television show
