= Tax Avoiders =

1986 video game

- Cover art
- Developer: Dunhill Electronics
- Publisher: American Videogame
- Designer: John Simonds
- Platform: Atari 2600
- Release: NA: December 1986
- Genre: Platform
- Mode: Single-player

Tax Avoiders is a platformer video game for the Atari 2600. Players are tasked with becoming a millionaire by collecting sources of income and avoiding red tape and IRS agents. The game was designed through Dunhill Electronics by John Simonds, who had also worked on the Atari 2600 game Porky's. It was published by American Videogame. According to Randall Hyde, a Porky's programmer, it was conceived as part of a tax avoidance scheme by Simonds. It bears a 1982 copyright date but only released years later.

== Gameplay ==
The object of Tax Avoiders is to help John Q become a millionaire within one game year by collecting income and avoiding taxes. There are two alternating game phases. In one, the player moves around the screen, collecting dollar bills and avoiding red tape; this represents maximizing income for the quarter. At the end of the quarter, the other phase has the player move around to manage his investments while another sprite oscillates between an Internal Revenue Service (IRS) agent, a certified public accountant (CPA), and an investment advisor. If the player is caught by the IRS agent, he is audited, and always loses the audit, which takes 50% of his income. If he encounters the CPA, he is charged a fee but gains new tax-sheltered investment options. If he encounters an investment advisor, he can maximize his tax-sheltered investment returns.

John Q on the right stands next to a source of income. On the left, red tape lies on the ground as an obstacle.

== Development ==
On the packaging, Tax Avoiders is credited to Darrell Wagner a "Licensed Tax Consultant and former IRS Revenue Agent" and Todd Clark Holm "an independent investment advisor, registered with the S.E.C.". It was developed by Dunhill Electronics and designed by John Simonds. It was published by American Videogame.

Dunhill Electronics is also credited as a developer on Porky's, an Atari 2600 game published by Fox Video Games, for which John Simonds was also credited. According to Randall Hyde, one of Porky's programmers, Dunhill Electronics was a tax write-off scheme conceived of by Simonds. Dunhill produced many cheap games with a lot of shared code. Most games were never intended for release but, according to Hyde, games would occasionally need to be shipped to keep up appearances. The U.S. Copyright Office lists almost 300 items attributed to Dunhill Electronics registered between 1983 and 1984, many of them video games. Tax Avoiders bears a copyright year of 1982 and was registered on February 6, 1984. Only Porky's and Tax Avoiders are known to have shipped. Computer Entertainer reported on Tax Avoiders as a "new" Atari 2600 game in their January 1987 issue.

== Reception ==
Computer Entertainer called it "cleverly conceived but primitively implemented." They considered the graphics "barely acceptable" and the controls "less than smooth", ultimately deciding it was mostly only valuable for collectors. Ian Bogost wrote that Tax Avoiders "mounts an interesting and relatively complex procedural rhetoric about tax avoidance strategies." He thought the process of tax avoidance being mapped to physical movement was not ideal but still somewhat persuasive, "the player must run around to collect income, literally avoiding red tape." Brett Weiss called the gameplay "redundant" and lacking in difficulty, but "more fun than doing actual taxes."

== See also ==
- List of Atari 2600 games
