= Video Olympics =

1977 video game

- Box art by Cliff Spohn
- Developer(s): Atari, Inc.
- Publisher(s): Atari, Inc.
- Designer(s): Joe Decuir
- Platform(s): Atari 2600
- Release: September 1977
- Genre(s): Sports
- Mode(s): Single-player, multiplayer

Video Olympics is a sports video game programmed by Joe Decuir for the Atari 2600. It is one of the nine 2600 launch titles Atari, Inc. published when the 2600 system was released in September 1977. The cartridge is a collection of games from Atari's popular arcade Pong series. A similar collection in arcade machine form called Tournament Table was published by Atari in 1978.

Video Olympics was rebranded by Sears as Pong Sports.

== Gameplay ==
The games are a collection of bat-and-ball style games, including several previously released by Atari, Inc. as arcade games. The games use the Video Computer System's paddle controllers, and are for one to four players (three or four players requires a second set of paddles).

=== Games ===
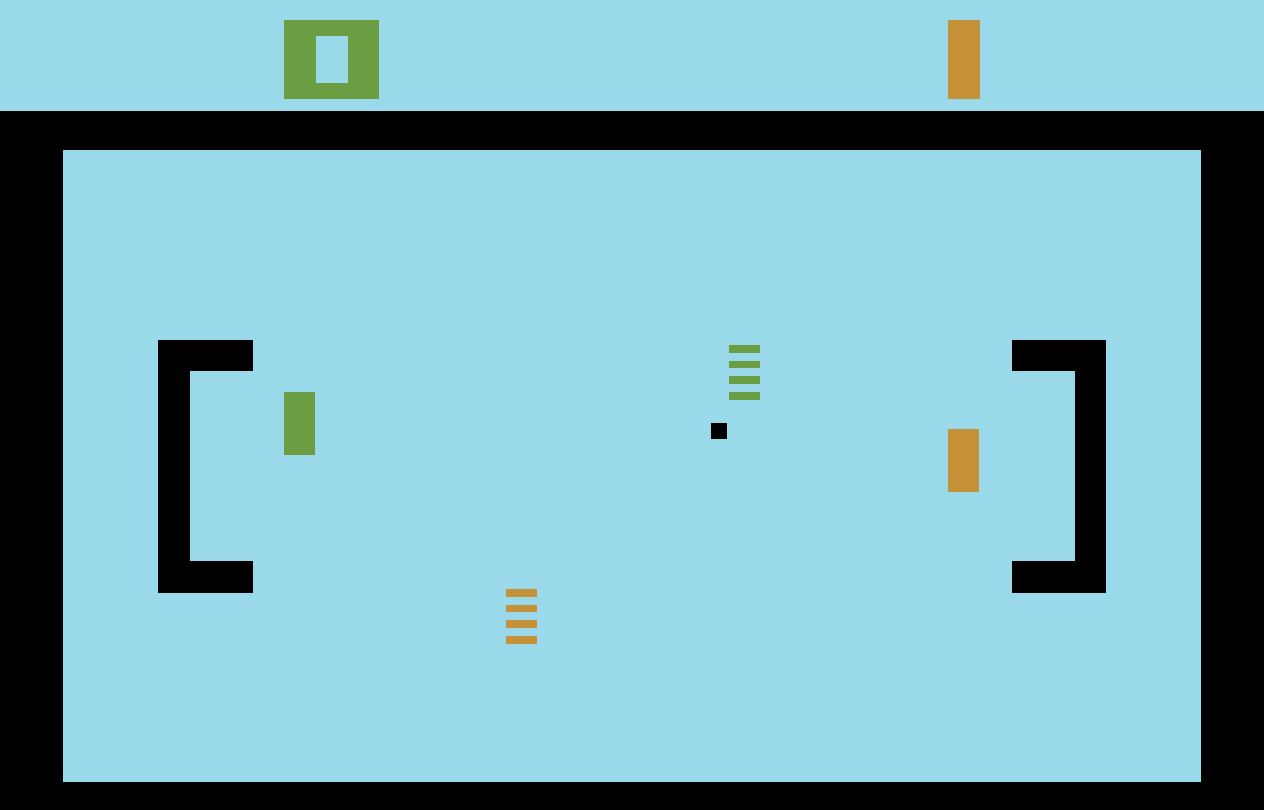
The Hockey variation

Video Olympics includes 50 games and variations:

- Pong - The classic table tennis simulation.
- Super Pong - A Pong variation where each player has two paddles.
- Robot Pong - A solitaire Pong variation.
- Pong Doubles
- Quadrapong - A four-player, four-wall Pong variation.
- Foozpong - Based on Foozball, this Pong variant has the players control a vertical three-paddle column.
- Soccer
- Handball - A handball simulation.
- Ice hockey
- Hockey III - An ice hockey simulation where players can catch and shoot the puck at the opposing goal.
- Basketball - A basketball simulation.
- Volleyball - A volleyball simulation where the traditional (Pong-style) left-right volley is swapped for a top-bottom volley. Players can volley or spike.

== Reception ==
The cartridge and its individual games were reviewed twice in Video magazine. In the Winter 1979 issue of Video, the cartridge was reviewed as part of a general review of the Atari VCS where it received a review score of 8.5 out of 10, and its constituent games were characterized as "old standbys" but "still lots of fun". A more thorough review appeared in Video's "Arcade Alley" column in the Summer 1979 issue where the release was generally praised for "tak[ing] Atari's Pong concept and explor[ing] it to the limit." Individual games were singled out as well, with praise for Volleyball and Robot Pong (described as "astonishingly good"), and criticism for Handball (for its use of a visually disturbing blinking paddle rather than an absent paddle to indicate inactive players), and Basketball (described as primitive compared to Atari's own 1978 version of Basketball).

== See also ==
- List of Atari 2600 games
