= Tournament Table =

1978 video game

- Developer: Atari, Inc.
- Publishers: Atari, Inc.
- Platforms: Arcade, Atari 2600
- Release: NA: March 1978
- Genre: Sports
- Modes: Single-player, multiplayer

Tournament Table is a 1978 arcade video game released by Atari, Inc. The Atari VCS version is called Video Olympics.

== Gameplay ==
Tournament Table is basically a multi-game arcade with several Pong variations. After inserting a coin, the player is prompted to choose one of the several games available. Those games are:

- Breakout
- Soccer (2 variations)
- Foozpong
- Hockey (3 variations)
- Quadra Pong
- Handball
- Basketball (2 variations)

Breakout is the only one-player game, the other being for two, three, or four players.
