= PlatterMania =

1982 video game

- Publisher: Epyx
- Designer: Michael Farren
- Platform: Atari 8-bit
- Release: 1982
- Genre: Action

PlatterMania is a video game written by Michael Farren for Atari 8-bit computers and published by Epyx in 1982. The player is a uses long poles like a juggler to balance spinning plates on top of them.

== Reception ==
Allen Doum reviewed the game for Computer Gaming World, and stated that "Since the same circus tune plays during each interlude, with no way to turn it off, this game seems aimed at children, but the children who played it for us got bored nearly as fast as the adults."

== See also ==
- Dishaster
