= Video Pinball (1981 video game) =

1981 video game

- Developer: Atari, Inc.
- Publishers: Atari, Inc.
- Programmer: Bob Smith
- Platform: Atari 2600
- Release: April 1981
- Genre: Pinball
- Modes: Single-player, multiplayer

Video Pinball is a 1981 pinball video game developed and published by Atari, Inc. for the Atari Video Computer System (renamed to the Atari 2600 in 1982). Sears re-released the game as Arcade Pinball.

== Gameplay ==
A game in progress

Video Pinball is a loose simulation of an arcade pinball machine: ball launcher, flippers, bumpers, and spinners. Hitting the Atari logo on the playfield four times awards an extra ball.

Pulling down on the joystick pulls the pinball machine plunger back while pressing the joystick button shoots the ball into the playfield. The left and right flippers are activated by moving the joystick controller left or right. The ball can be nudged (as in nudging a table gently in real life) by holding down the joystick button and moving the controller in a particular direction. Nudging too much results in a tilt, forcing the ball to drain.

== Development ==
Bob Smith applied to work for Atari, Inc. at the end of the 1970s and was hired on the spot. Smith shared an office Brad Stewart who had worked on the Atari VCS version of Asteroids. After a week in the office, Smith was offered a list of possible games to work on from his boss Dennis Koble and opted to work on Video Pinball. While he did play the original Video Pinball arcade game in Atari headquarters, he played the Superman pinball game by Atari for inspiration.

== Reception ==
Two million cartridges were sold, which earned Atari revenues of about $40 million. The programmer received a bonus of $6,000.

Retro Gamer described it more as Breakout with bumpers than pinball, but played well.

In a contemporary book the game was compared unfavorably to the 1979 arcade version of Video Pinball, with the quality of play similar to the least creative pinball machines, and lacking the "essence of pinball".

== See also ==
- List of Atari 2600 games
