= Joseph C. Decuir =

American fellow of IEEE

- Born: 1950 (age 75–76); Pasadena, California, United States
- Education: University of California, Berkeley (MA)
- Known for: Atari 2600; ITU-T V-series modem standards ITU-T T-series facsimile standards AT Command Set for GSM; Bluetooth Core Specifications
- Notable work: Video Olympics
- Spouse(s): Elizabeth C. Strauss (1982-1997); Deborah L.R. Freng (2001-2022)
- Children: 4

Joseph C. Decuir (born 1950) is an American fellow of the Institute of Electrical and Electronics Engineers (IEEE) who was nominated in 2015 for contributions to computer graphics and early video game systems. One of his fellow nomination sponsors was Ralph Baer. He is a fellow of the IEEE Consumer Electronics Society, IEEE Computer Society, and the IEEE Communications Society.

== Early video game systems ==
- Atari Video Computer System, aka Atari 2600
- Atari 8-bit computers - including work on the Atari SIO universal serial interface.
- Amiga - Design of the MOS Technology Agnus DMA chip, awarded four US patents.

== Engineering standards ==
Decuir made substantial technical and editorial contributions to wired and wireless communications engineering standards, including:

- ITU-T V-series modem standards: V.8, V.8bis, V.32bis V.34, V.80, V.90, V.250, V.251 and V.253
- ITU-T T-series facsimile standards: T.30, T.31 and T.32
- European Telecommunications Standard Institute (ETSI): ETS 300 642: AT Command Set for GSM Mobile Equipment (ME)
- USB Communications Device Class, Wireless Mobile Communications and Network Control Model; awarded a US patent for the bus termination.
- European Computer Manufacturers Association (ECMA International): ECMA-368, High Rate Ultra Wideband MAC and PHY Standard
- Wireless USB v1.1
- Bluetooth Core Specifications: v3.0, v4.0, v4.1 and v4.2
- Bluetooth Profiles and Services: RESTful API, Internet Protocol Support v1.0, HTTP Proxy Services v1.0

=== Current engineering related activities ===
- Lecturer at University of Washington Bothell in Electronics Engineering: https://www.uwb.edu/
- Secretary of IEEE Region 6 - Western United States: http://ieee-region6.org/
- Editor of draft IEEE Standard 2030.10, DC Microgrids:
- IEEE Consumer Electronics Society Board of Governors, 2015-2017: https://ctsoc.ieee.org/

== Personal life ==
Decuir is a resident of Issaquah, Washington. He has four children and four grandchildren.

Decuir volunteers his time to IEEE Global Humanitarian Conferences.
