= Ultravision Video Arcade System =

Unrealeased Games System

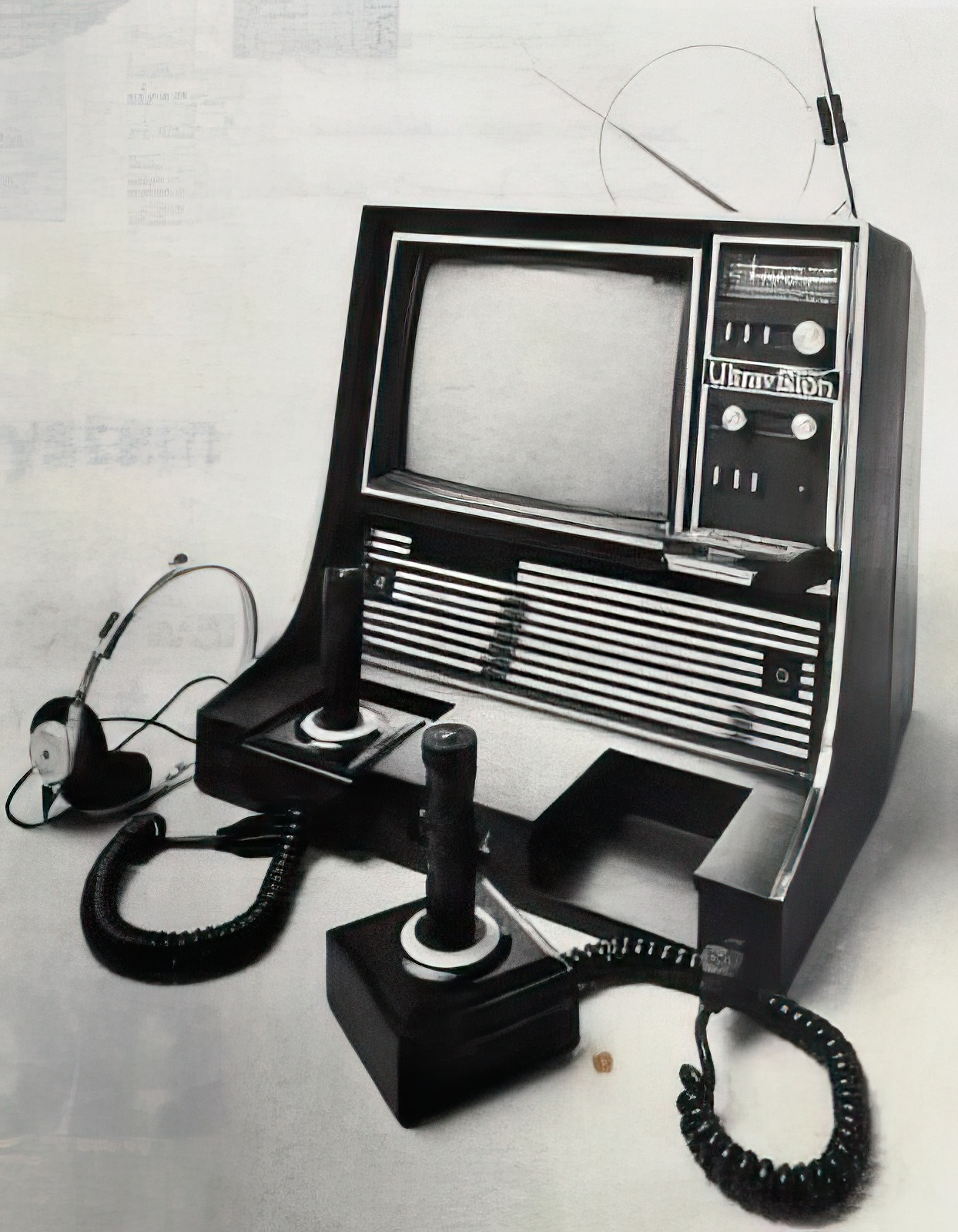
- Prototype Ultravision arcade system
- Also known as: VAS
- CPU: Zilog Z80
- Memory: 64 KB
- Display: 10" color CRT
- Input: Keyboard
- Controller input: Joystick

The Ultravision Video Arcade System (VAS) was an unreleased gaming console announced at the 1983 Consumer Electronics Show. The slogan provided by the company, "It's a COMPUTER, It's a COLOR TV, It's an ARCADE.", was intended to demonstrate that the console combines a game system, a colour TV and a personal computer system.

However, the system never went further than the prototype stage. After the initial announcement no further information was released. It is supposed that the company did not have the appropriate financial basis to release such an advanced multimedia machine.

== Design ==
The system was composed of a standard 10" color television integrated with the game console, and controlled by two 16-direction joysticks with top-mounted buttons and came with a headphone jack. It could run off either AC or DC power, making it portable by allowing it to run off a car battery. The home computer system had 64k of RAM which could be activated with an optional master keyboard, and a Zilog Z80 microprocessor.

In addition to supporting its own line of game cartridges, the console was intended to have plugin modules that would have supported the ColecoVision and Atari 2600 game libraries.

The list price was given as $595 USD ($1,923 in 2025).
