= Pick 'n Pile =

1990 video game

- Developer: Ubi Soft
- Publisher: Ubi Soft
- Platforms: Amiga, Amstrad CPC, Apple II, Apple IIGS, Atari 2600, Atari ST, Commodore 64, MS-DOS, ZX Spectrum
- Release: 1990

Pick 'n Pile is a video game published by Ubisoft in 1990.

== Gameplay ==
Pick 'n Pile on the Atari 2600

Pick 'n Pile is a game in which colored shapes crash to the ground and collide, and the player must organize whichever pieces did not explode.

== Reception ==
Allen Greenberg reviewed the game for Computer Gaming World, and stated that "Pick 'n Pile will probably never reach the obsessive heights enjoyed by Tetris or Lemmings. However, it has an original flavor and charm to it which should earn it a following. For those who enjoy fast-moving, non-shoot-'em-up arcade exercises, Pick 'n Pile is worth checking out."

Tom Malcom for Info rated the game 5 stars and said "I absolutely love these games that let me turn off my brain and veg out in front of my Amiga; pixel Zen, I like to call it. If you like mindless pursuits as much as I do, don't miss Pick 'N Pile."

Your Sinclair said "apart from the extra colour and the balls instead of blocks it's almost identical to Puzznic. The graphics are perhaps better - colourful and clear for the most part. It's not often that things get hard to make out. Yep, Pick 'n' Pile is a very pretty game."

Crash! rated the game 56% and said "With so many good puzzle games around at the moment Pick 'n' Pile is not going to make my Christmas list this year."

Atari ST User rated the game 73% overall and said "Its long term appeal still remains to be seen, but for now it's definitely good fun."

Mark Higham for ST Format rated the game 46% overall and said "Pick 'n' Pile is certainly fun to play for a while, but where it falls short of its nearest rivals like Plotting and Manix is in its simplicity."
