= I Want My Mommy =

1983 video game

- Developer: Zimag
- Publisher: Zimag
- Platform: Atari 2600
- Release: NA: 1983
- Genre: Platform
- Modes: Single-player, multiplayer

I Want My Mommy is a video game for the Atari 2600 released in North America by Zimag in 1983. It is a platform game (then called climbing games by the US press). The game was given the KidStuff logo on the cover art; meaning it was aimed at children under the age of nine.

Bootleg versions of the game were sold under three different names: Apples and Dolls by CCE, Teddy Apple by Home Vision, and Ursinho Esperto by CCE.

== Gameplay ==
Gameplay screenshot

The player controls Teddy, and must guide him up a six-story structure to the goal at the top. The goal of the first stage is to collect the Apple at the top, and the goal of the second is to get to the mommy at the top. After completing the two stages, the game ends. Your goal is to complete both stages with the lowest time on the score counter.

Attempting to stop Teddy from reaching the top are monsters that patrol the floors of the structure. Since Teddy can't jump, he has to use teleportation beams to connect upward on the playing field. Monsters can be faked out by partially going up a teleporter then coming back down again.

When a player starts or completes the game, the music played is Little Brown Jug written by Joseph Winner.

== Reception ==
The August/September 1983 issue of Video Games Player called the game "great for little kids, but bad for everyone else."
