= Miniature Golf (video game) =

1979 video game

- Cover art by Cliff Spohn
- Developer: Atari, Inc.
- Publishers: Atari, Inc.
- Designer: Tom Reuterdahl
- Platform: Atari 2600
- Release: March 1979
- Genre: Sports (miniature golf)
- Modes: Single-player, 2 players alternating

Miniature Golf is a golf video game developed for the Atari VCS (later called the Atari 2600) by Tom Reuterdahl and published by Atari, Inc. in 1979.

== Gameplay ==
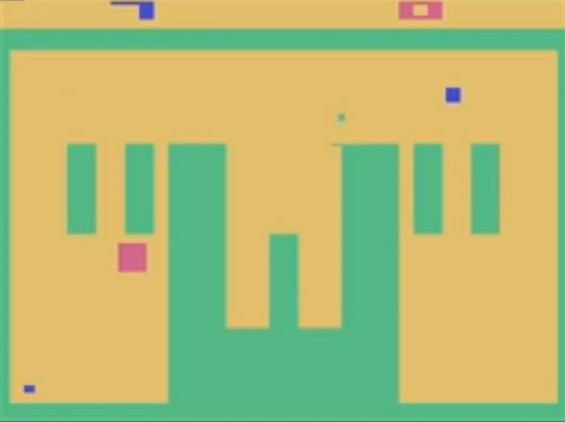
Gameplay screenshot

There are nine playable holes in Miniature Golf. The goal of each hole is to get the ball into the cup. Each time the player hits the ball, a stroke is added to their score. The number of strokes the player may take are unlimited. A par represents the number to strokes the player ideally must take to complete the hole.

== Release ==
Miniature Golf was released in 1979 and published by Atari, Inc. For the Sears Tele-Games release of the game published by Sears, the game was re-titled Arcade Golf.

The cover art of Miniature Golf was done by Cliff Spohn. Spohn started working as a freelancer for Atari in 1977 through Palo Alto-based agency called Steven Jacobs Design. Spohn recalled that he went out to a local miniature golf course and took photographs of everything around him to get images for the cover.

== Reception ==
From retrospective reviews, Brett Weiss in his book Classic Home Video Games 1972-1984 wrote that the game had unimaginatively laid out courses and that it had "some of the worst graphics in the history of video games", specifically noting the simple squares for objects and holes.

== See also ==
- List of Atari 2600 games
