= Dishaster =

1983 video game for the Atari 2600

- Box cover
- Developer: Zimag
- Publisher: Zimag
- Platform: Atari 2600
- Release: 1983
- Genre: Action
- Mode: Single-player

Dishaster is an action game released for the Atari 2600 in 1983 by Zimag. Another version of the game was released by Bit Corporation under the name Dancing Plates which features oriental-themed graphics and adds eight game variations.

Dishaster was inspired by the circus tradition of keeping spinning plates suspended on poles. The player controls a girl attempting to keep a group of several spinning plates balanced on poles from falling. The game received negative reviews; criticism focused on the game's repetition and monotony.

== Gameplay ==
Four plates are in play.

The girl can stabilize wobbling dishes by pressing the button on the controller. If a plate falls, the player is able to capture it if the girl touches it before it hits the ground, and a new one appears at the top of the pole. The number of poles to spin varies between the selected skill level; there are six on the easiest setting, and ten on the hardest. The player loses if they let four dishes hit the ground.

== Reception ==
The reviewer for TV Gamer magazine wrote, in 1983, "Dishaster may be enjoyed by very young gamers, but it is not sophisticated enough for any battle-hardened arcade gamers."

Non-contemporary reviews were negative. Author Brett Weiss stated that Dishaster was "as bad as its unfunny title implies" and that it was "a hopelessly repetitive game". While Weiss found the graphics "convincing," he remarked that "the plate-spinning action gets old in a hurry". Al Backiel, a reviewer for the newsletter and website Digital Press, wrote:

Dishaster gets to be so monotonous so quickly because if you play in a systematic manner it's too easy: I move sequentially from left to right and repeat. Yep, really tough pattern. I was able to max out the easy version without dropping a plate after several hours. I was hoping something interesting would happen, but the score just resets to zero after passing 999,999.

Another Digital Press writer, Kevin Oleniacz, included the game in his "The Worst of the Atari 2600" list, writing: "The lack of sound effects, details or any background whatsoever while maneuvering around one unchanging screen would surely claim this as a DISASTER".

== See also ==
- PlatterMania
