= Beat 'Em & Eat 'Em =

1982 pornographic video game by Mystique

- Developer: JHM Ltd.
- Publisher: American Multiple Industries
- Platform: Atari 2600
- Release: NA: November 1982
- Genre: Adult
- Mode: Single-player

Beat 'Em and Eat 'Em (Note: Also known as Mystique Presents Swedish Erotica: Beat 'Em and Eat 'Em) is a pornographic video game for the Atari 2600 made by American Multiple Industries in 1982. Players control two nude women; the goal is to catch semen in their mouths, which is falling from a masturbating man on a rooftop, without missing. Its gameplay has been compared to the Atari game Kaboom!. There is also a gender-reversed version of the game titled Philly Flasher that features identical gameplay. Beat 'Em & Eat 'Em has received negative reviews since its release and is an oft-cited example of pornographic Atari 2600 games.

== Gameplay ==
Gameplay screenshot

Players control two nude women on the street who must catch semen in their mouths that comes from a masturbating man on a rooftop without missing. This can be accomplished merely by semen touching the women's bodies before it hits the ground. A more difficult setting requires players to catch the semen before it goes past the women's shoulders. If the player successfully catches all the semen in one round, the two women lick their lips and the game progresses to the next round. If any semen hits the ground, the first turn is over. Players are allowed to miss four times before the game is over. They can gain a turn every 69 points scored (up to two extra turns). Players move both women using the controller's paddle and the game allows each player to control one woman. The game plays similarly to the Atari game Kaboom! (1981).

== Release ==
Beat 'Em & Eat 'Em was published and developed by American Multiple Industries and JHM Ltd. in 1982.

== Reception ==
Beat 'Em & Eat 'Em has received negative reviews since its release. It is often cited as an example of pornographic Atari 2600 games. The developer had received criticism for this game. Atari HQ identified both the Beat 'Em & Eat 'Em and the PlayAround cartridge a rarity level of 5 out of 10. AllGame rated it two stars out of five. Seanbaby included it in his list of the 10 naughtiest games of all time; he mocked a quote in the manual that chastises players who fail to catch sperm as the sperm "could have been a famous doctor or lawyer" due to the fact that swallowing sperm has the same effect as letting it hit the ground — namely, it cannot result in conception either way. He also criticized the level of eroticism stating, "There's something non-erotic about skipping past the courting, past the foreplay, past the actual sex, and getting straight to the sperm-swallowing. They might as well have skipped directly to sleeping on the wet spot."

Destructoid founder Niero Gonzalez listed it as the second most sexual Atari 2600 game ever made. Brett Elston criticized early Beat 'Em & Eat 'Em for its depiction of women as "crudely designed slamholes." GamesTM used it as an example of Atari 2600 games that feature masturbation as its core gameplay mechanic. Luke Plunkett noted that Beat 'Em & Eat 'Em was a "relatively harmless" adult game for the Atari, in contrast with Custer's Revenge. Daemon Hatfield expressed amazement that Beat 'Em & Eat 'Em was made 20 years before the controversial Hot Coffee minigame from Grand Theft Auto: San Andreas. PJ Hruschak wrote that games like Beat 'Em & Eat 'Em were more "silly than sexy." Luke of PALGN commented that Beat 'Em & Eat 'Em was "tasteless" and "inappropriate." Steven Poole satirized the News International phone hacking scandal using Beat 'Em & Eat 'Em called Whack 'Em & Hack 'Em in a commentary on the Supreme Court of the United States' ruling that video games are protected by the First Amendment to the United States Constitution and America's "'obscenity' exception" to free speech.

== Legacy ==
A gender-reversed version of the game was later released in a "double-ender" cartridge along with Cathouse Blues as Philly Flasher, in which the player is tasked with controlling two male prisoners with visibly erect penises as they attempt to catch drops of breast milk lactated by a witch. All gameplay mechanics are identical to the original, save for the fact that when the men catch all the milk, they masturbate and ejaculate. The rights for sales and distribution were taken over by GameSource, which changed the line of adult video games (which included Beat 'Em & Eat 'Em) to PlayAround. The company created multiple "double-ender" cartridges which included two of these adult games in one. One of these was a compilation of Beat 'Em & Eat 'Em and Lady in Wading.

== See also ==
- Bachelor Party
- Custer's Revenge
- Gigolo
- PlayAround
