= Zimag =

8-bit video game developer

- Product type: Video games Magnetic media
- Current owner: Magnetic Tape International

Zimag (stylized as ZiMAG) was the name used by Magnetic Tape International to market consumer products, including video games and blank audio cassettes, VHS tapes, and floppy disks. Magnetic Tape International was a wholly owned subsidiary of Intermagnetic Corporation. The company released games for the Atari 2600 and Atari 8-bit computers in 1982 and 1983. The 2600 games are from Bit Corporation ported from PAL to NTSC and with different names. The Atari 8-bit games were developed by Syncro, Inc.

Zimag's four Atari 2600 releases received more promotion than the relatively obscure computer games, but they were released during the video game crash of 1983.

== Games ==
Atari 2600

- Cosmic Corridor (1983)
- Dishaster (1983)
- I Want My Mommy (1983)
- Tanks But No Tanks (1983)

Atari 8-bit computers

- Cat Nap (1983)
- Collision Course (1982, originally promoted as Space Mines)
- Moon Beam Arcade (1983)
- Nineball (1982)
- River Rat (1982)
- A Mysterious Thief (2600)
- Bail Out
- Caverns of Oz
- Kerplop (Atari 8-bit)
- Pizza Chef (2600)
- Quest for Inca Gold (Atari 8-bit)

The Zimag catalog lists the following games beneath a "Spring '83" heading: Outpost, Meltdown, Moving Day, Car Jockey, Tally Ho, Immies and Aggies, Conrad, Dinograms, Cake Bake, and Evac. None of these were released.
