= X-Man (video game) =

1983 pornographic video game

- Developer: Universal Gamex
- Publisher: Universal Gamex
- Designer: Alan Roberts
- Programmer: H.K. Poon
- Platform: Atari 2600
- Release: NA: 1983
- Genres: Adult, Action
- Mode: Single-player

X-Man is a pornographic video game made for the Atari 2600 by Universal Gamex, designed by Alan Roberts and programmed by H. K. Poon. It was released in 1983. The game is unrelated to the similarly named Marvel comic book series entitled X-Men.

It is the only title made by Universal Gamex. It had faced protest from women's groups when it was first released, and most retailers declined to carry the game or if they did, buyers had to be at least 18 years old to purchase the game, or it was kept under-the-counter. It could also be purchased via mail order, and an advertisement inviting such purchases appeared in at least one gaming magazine; a full-page example can be found in the July 1983 issue of Videogaming Illustrated.

== Gameplay ==
X-Man on Atari 2600

In the game, the player controls a naked man in a labyrinth. The objective is to reach the door at the center of the labyrinth avoiding scissors, crabs or teeth. The player then enters a bonus stage simulating sexual intercourse between the man and a woman upon completing said objective.
