= Star Fox (1983 video game) =

1983 Atari 2600 video game

- Developer: Bruce de Graaf
- Publisher: Mythicon
- Designer: Bruce de Graaf
- Platform: Atari 2600
- Release: 1983 (USA)
- Genre: Shooter
- Modes: Single-player, multiplayer

Star Fox on Atari 2600

Star Fox is a video game written by Bruce de Graaf for the Atari 2600 console and published by Mythicon in 1983.

The game has no connection to Nintendo's Star Fox franchise which debuted a decade later.

== Gameplay ==
The game takes place in the year AD 4024. The story begins as a robot freighter carrying a cargo of extremely valuable trimetalisium energy crystals crash lands on the planetoid Beta-7. An enemy star cruiser, escorted by a squadron of fighter drones, is en route to the planetoid to seize the crystals.

The player's objective is to recover the crystals before the enemy while doing battle with the fighter drones.

== Reception ==
The game is widely considered to be one of the worst games on the Atari 2600.

In a Digital Press article on the worst games for the Atari 2600, Star Fox was ranked nineteenth:

[...] you control a spaceship on a mission to extract gems beneath the ocean depths. Your ship is defenseless at the bottom of the screen, and amazingly the gems become intelligent and avoid your efforts while taking advantage of the fact that your ship cannot move sideways while at the bottom. Only one enemy and one gem per screen. The playfield and difficulty never change.

— Kevin Oleniacz, Digital Press
