= Power Arcade =

Atari 2600 novelty controllers

- The Cosmic Commander (left) and Flight Commander (right)
- Manufacturer: Milton Bradley
- Type: Game controllers
- Generation: Second generation
- Released: 1983
- Introductory price: $39 ($126 in 2026)

The Power Arcade is a series of video game controllers designed for the Atari 2600 and manufactured by Milton Bradley. Two controllers were released in 1983, the Cosmic Commander and Flight Commander. Each was packaged with an original Atari 2600 game, Survival Run and Spitfire Attack respectively. A third controller titled the Armored Commander, packaged with a game titled Tank Blitz, never released.

Both controllers simulate the controls of an Atari joystick with two handles which move the body of the controller relative to its base. Four D batteries power flashing lights and controller vibration, which activate every time the action button is pressed. The vibration feature predates the DualShock and Rumble pak controllers by 14 years. The controllers are compatible with the Atari joystick port and are usable with other platforms such as the Atari 8-bit computers and Commodore VIC-20.

Survival Run is a first-person rail shooter set in a science fiction maze. It received poor reception from critics who consider it to have "basic" and "choppy" gameplay and "uninspired" graphics. Spitfire Attack is a first-person flight simulation video game where players shoot down enemy planes while avoiding the ground. Critics consider it to be "sparse" and "basic" but marginally better than Survival Run. Reviewers appreciated the aesthetic effort of the controllers and thought they worked well with their included games, but had numerous criticisms about the execution. Cheap materials, difficulty keeping the controllers still, and confusing controls are common criticisms. Some critics consider the included games to be easier to play using a regular joystick.

== Design ==
Both controllers have a flat base meant to be placed on a table-like surface and two handles on either side. These handles allow the player to move the controller in four directions to replicate the complete functionality of a standard Atari 2600 joystick. The Cosmic Commander resembles a space ship control panel and the Flight Commander is resembles an airplane machine gun. The body of the controllers can move relative to their base. Players push the body forward or backward to produce up and down inputs and turn the body clockwise or counter-clockwise to produce left and right inputs. A single action button is placed at the top left of both controllers. Both use a standard Atari joystick port, allowing compatibility with games for the Atari 2600, Atari 8-bit computers, Commodore VIC-20, Commodore 64 and more.

The Flight Commander features World War I-esque decals,a large sight with a reticle, and a fake radar and fuel gauge with a backlight. The Cosmic Commander features an upright rectangular panel and a backlight four color radar display. In addition to power from the joystick port, both controllers take four D batteries. These batteries are optional but power the controllers lights and vibration. Whenever the players presses the action button, lights on the decals flash and the controller vibrates, similar to the rumble paks later used for the PlayStation and Nintendo 64.

== Release ==
Milton Bradley had previously manufactured a number of video game products, including the Microvision, Vectrex, and the MBX voice module compatible with the TI-99/4A home computer. The two Power Arcade controllers were the first and only products for the Atari 2600 the company released. They were first announced at the Consumer Electronics Show in June 1983, planned to release later in the summer. Each was planned for a suggested retail price of $40. Video Games magazine speculated that the novelty controllers were an attempt to catch consumers attention amidst the ongoing video game crash of 1983. According to The Video Game Update, the two controllers shipped sometime after October 1983. A third controller called the Armored Commander paired with the video game Tank Blitz was planned, though both never released. Milton Bradley left the video game business on January 27, 1984 following heavy losses on the Vectrex.

== Games ==
Both games are playable without their respective pack-in controllers using a standard joystick.

=== Survival Run ===
Survival Run is a first person rail shooter published by Milton Bradley and included alongside the Cosmic Commander controller. According to Ty Roberts, the former CTO of Universal Music Group, he developed the game at Renaissance Technology along with Vic Ivashin and Dusty Duistermars. Players navigate a space ship through a maze while shooting alien guards and force fields. The entirety of the maze is displayed at the top of the screen. When the player reaches a fork, a divider appears and they must move their reticle to one side or the other to avoid hitting it. At the end of each maze is an alien command ship which must be defeated to finish the current maze and progress to a harder level. The spaceship has a limited amount of energy which depletes when taking damage or firing a shot. Electronic Fun with Computers & Games called it "one of the most basic and terrible first-person contests ever made." AtariHQ thought "its uninspired graphics and choppy gameplay will immediately turn most gamers off." Video Games magazine thought it was a "suitable macho game" and well suited to the Power Arcade controller.

=== Spitfire Attack ===
Spitfire Attack is a first-person flight simulation video game based around dogfighting, published by Milton Bradley and included alongside the Flight Commander controller. It was developed by Video Soft, a company founded by Jerry Lawson, the former lead designer for the Fairchild Channel F. Players pilot a fighter plane shooting down enemy planes, anti-aircraft guns, and ammo dumps. No altimeter is included to inform players about their height but a warning buzzer does sound if they go too low. If the player goes low enough they crash. Six skill levels and two difficulty levels are included. Brett Weiss considered it graphically "sparse and basic" but aided by the Flight Commander controller. AtariHQ thought it was "boring" and added nothing new. Video Games magazine thought it featured slightly more varied gameplay and better graphics than Survival Run.

== Reception ==
Electronic Games described the grinding noises and vibration as "reminiscent of a souped-up electric toothbrush." They recommended the controllers only for young children saying "older home arcaders might have little use for [them]." Electronic Fun with Computers & Games gave Survival Run two and a half joysticks out of four, but claimed it "doesn't even deserve the appellation of 'game'" and would get "half a joystick" if not for the utility of the Cosmic Commander for other first person games. They compared the vibration to being shocked by a "practical joker". In the next issue, they gave Spitfire Attack a more positive review and called the controller fun "especially with the batteries" but that the game might be easier to control without it. AtariHQ considers the controllers to be cheap gimmick that add nothing to the games they were included with. They also criticize the fragility of the controllers due to the "cheap plastic" used.

Video Games magazine editor Dan Persons criticized many aspects of the controllers, including the fact that clockwise turns on the Cosmic Commander cause the in-game reticle to move left (and vice-versa) and frequent occasions when button presses produced real life effects but did nothing in-game. He also noted difficultly keeping the controllers still even despite rubber feet and heavy batteries. He also experienced an occasion where the internal electronics seemed to melt the plastic. Persons saw the fact the gunsights, flashing lights, and vibrations had no coordination with the gameplay itself to be an aesthetic disappointment. He thought it wouldn't be good replacement for a standard joystick but fit well with the included games. He said "the look is right, and the games aren't bad, but the unity isn't there."
