= Bachelor Party (video game) =

1982 adult-themed video game by Mystique

- Developer: JHM Ltd.
- Publishers: American Multiple Industries; GameSource; PlayAround
- Platform: Atari 2600
- Release: 1982
- Genres: Adult, action
- Modes: Single player, multiplayer

Bachelor Party (also released as Mystique Presents Swedish Erotica: Bachelor Party) is a pornographic video game video game for the Atari 2600 published by American Multiple Industries under its Mystique label in 1982. A gender swapped version, titled Bachelorette Party was later released by PlayAround on a double ended cartridge with Burning Desire.

== Gameplay ==
Gameplay screenshot

The game is a simplified version of Breakout where the "ball" is made to look like a nude man and the "bricks" are made to look like nude women and the man bounces back and forth horizontally rather than vertically. On the left, he is repelled by a woman with whom he collides and subsequently eliminates from play, or by the opposing wall. On the right, a paddle (said to be a container of aphrodisiac "Spanish Fly" in the manual) returns the depleted bachelor to the room full of women. The paddle is controlled by the player using a paddle controller.

The premise is that of an unnamed bachelor having his final fling with a room full of inexplicably nude women. The equally unclothed bachelor is propelled repeatedly into the room of women by a container of "Spanish Fly" used as the player's paddle. When entering the fray, the bachelor's exaggerated and pixelated penis is seen to be erect. When he returns from having collided with (and presumably had sexual intercourse with) a woman or after hitting the opposing wall, his penis sags. It returns to erect when the bachelor is successfully set moving again toward the left.

== Release history ==
Steven L. Kent lists Bachelor Party as one of three X-rated Atari VCS titles released in 1982. According to Willaert, after the controversy over Custer's Revenge, the remaining Mystique titles, including Bachelor Party, were folded into the PlayAround line, which also introduced gender-swapped companion titles. Bachelor Party's companion title was Bachelorette Party, which uses the same basic gameplay with the male and female sprites reversed. The player uses the paddle to bounce a naked woman toward naked men.

== See also ==
- Beat 'Em & Eat 'Em
- Custer's Revenge
- Gigolo
