= Porky's (video game) =

1983 video game

- Publishers: 20th Century Fox (2600); Romox (Atari 8-bit)
- Platforms: Atari 2600, Atari 8-bit
- Release: 1983
- Genre: Action
- Mode: Single-player

Porky's is an action game released for the Atari 2600 in 1983 by 20th Century Fox. It is based on the 1981 comedy film. A version for Atari 8-bit computers was published on cartridge by Romox.

== Gameplay ==
Atari 8-bit opening scene

The player controls the film's character Pee Wee Morris as he attempts to blow up Porky's Bar, by collecting a series of objects hidden in a shower room.

To access the shower room, the player must first try to get Pee Wee across a five-lane highway without getting hit, similar to the game mechanic in Frogger. If something touches Pee Wee before he can cross the street, he is dropped into the swamp below Porky's. From there, he must build a ladder by retrieving blocks atop two platforms. Pee Wee hoists himself upon the platforms using a pole. Once he gets enough blocks, he can climb into the shower room from below.

Atari 8-bit shower room

The shower room has a series of ladders for Pee Wee to climb to retrieve the objects while a woman showers. If Pee Wee crosses into the woman's line of sight at any time, the film character Ms. Beulah Balbricker will appear and chase him. Pee Wee must move the object from atop the shower down through a hole in the floor and climb out of the room through the top. If Ms. Balbricker "latches onto" him, or if Pee Wee steps into the hole in the floor, he falls back into the swamp and must try again. However, this time he is only allowed to vault onto the leftmost platform while Porky Mitchell's brother, the local sheriff, is standing on the right platform and will remain there for each subsequent time Pee Wee falls.

The process repeats until he has found enough objects. For each object he retrieves, one lane of the highway is cleared and he cannot be harmed by anything in it. After all the objects have been dropped into the hole, play moves to a scaffold where Pee Wee tries to reach the roof of the bar while Porky waits for him down below. The scaffold must be climbed in a specific manner and resets every time Pee Wee makes a mistake. If he misses a step, Pee Wee falls onto the ground where Porky catches him and tosses him back into the swamp.

To win, Pee Wee must find the correct path up the scaffold and avoid Porky. If he does, he is taken to an area with a plunger. Pee Wee must jump on the plunger, which creates an explosion and Porky's sinks into the swamp.

== Reception ==
In a 1983 review, Dan Persons introduced the Atari 2600 version of Porky's as "tasteless, sexist, and sophomoric", then concluded, "The game is so original and entertaining that I can't help loving it. If it is as popular as the movie upon which it was based, and it should be, then Fox has a winner on its hands."

Yahoo Entertainment derided the game in 2015, saying "Good god, there was even a Porky's game. ... But it sure is fun to look back at which games [based on movies] actually worked and which games were Porky's."
