= Custer's Revenge =

1982 pornographic video game

- Developer: JHM Ltd.
- Publisher: American Multiple Industries
- Designer: Joel Martin
- Platform: Atari 2600
- Release: NA: November 1982
- Genre: Action
- Modes: Single-player, multiplayer

Custer's Revenge (also known as Mystique Presents Swedish Erotica: Custer's Revenge) is an adult action game published by American Multiple Industries for the Atari 2600, first released in November 1982. The game gained notoriety owing to its goal of raping a Native American woman who is tied to a post.

The titular player character is based on Lieutenant Colonel and Brevet Major General George Armstrong Custer, a famous American cavalry commander who is most well known for his major defeat and death at the Battle of Little Bighorn.

Following the Christmas season of 1982, the rights to American Multiple Industries' games, including Custer's Revenge, were sold off to GameSource. Under PlayAround's parent company, Castlespring Enterprises, Custer's Revenge was rebranded as Westward Ho for the European market and given slight modifications to its original gameplay. These alterations included simple aesthetic changes such as the darkening in color of the Native American woman's skin tone. PlayAround also made a gender-reversed version of Custer's Revenge named General Re-Treat, which was packaged on a double-ended cartridge with Westward Ho.

The game was universally panned by critics due to its offensive content and has been described as one of the worst video games ever made.

== Gameplay ==
An example of gameplay in Custer's Revenge

Custer's Revenge is an action video game in which the player controls a mostly nude General Custer, who must advance through the playing field and avoid arrows to rape the fully nude Native American woman Revenge, who is tied to a pole on the other side. The game consists of four numbered modes of play; modes 1 and 3 are single-player campaigns, while modes 2 and 4 are hotseat multiplayer modes. In modes 1 and 2, the player(s) must only avoid arrows, while in modes 3 and 4, cacti that appear and disappear at random intervals are added as obstacles.

Custer begins the game with three lives, which are represented by small cacti on a black stripe at the bottom of the screen. If an arrow touches Custer's hat or if he comes into contact with a cactus, he loses a life to the tune of "Taps". It is possible for Custer to stand in between two arrows and not get hit. If Custer successfully reaches Revenge, the player must repeatedly press the fire button for Custer to rape her, which occurs to the "Charge" fanfare. Each penetration awards one point, and the player earns an extra life for every 50 points. The player(s) can accumulate no more than six lives at any given time. For every 50 points scored, Custer returns to his original position on the field, and the speed of the arrows increases. The arrow speed can also be increased by flipping the difficulty switch on the Atari console.

== Development and release ==
The design of Custer's Revenge was led by Joel Martin, co-founder of American Multiple Industries (operating as Mystique), who served as the primary creator and designer of the game. It was developed as part of the "Swedish Erotica" series to capitalize on the lack of pornography available in the medium of video games. The development was deliberately sloppy and rushed because quality did not matter—they only needed a product on store shelves. The overtly racist and sexist themes were chosen to maximize outrage and generate free publicity.

Custer's Revenge quickly gained notoriety upon its release. Sold in a sealed package labeled "NOT FOR SALE TO MINORS" and selling for $49.95 (equivalent to $167 in 2025), it acknowledged that children might nonetheless see the game. The game's literature stated "if the kids catch you and should ask, tell them Custer and the maiden are just dancing." The makers elected to preview the game for women's and Native American groups, an act that many thought was a publicity stunt.

== Controversy ==
Women's rights groups such as the National Organization for Women criticized the game as "degrading, offensive and a blatant statement of racism and sexism [...] NOW cannot ignore any company which seeks to so blatantly portray acts of violence against women as a form of entertainment." Native Americans also protested the game, with the executive director of the Tulsa Native American Coalition saying "It is very degrading to the Indian woman as well as all women in general," and "There's no other way we can take it other than a racial slur." Other groups that opposed the game included the Native American Political Action Committee, United National Indian Youth Inc., the Oklahoma Human Rights Commission, the American Indian Training and Employment Program, the NAACP, the Urban League, and the YWCA. American Multiple Industries president Stuart Kesten responded to criticism of the game by saying "There is a sexual act, but it is not rape. It never has been."

Los Angeles County voted 3–1 to ban Custer's Revenge alongside American Multiple Industries' other adult-only games Bachelor Party and Beat 'Em & Eat 'Em. Suffolk County, New York voted to ban all "X-rated" games within their jurisdiction. Multiple Industries subsequently pursued an $11 million lawsuit against Suffolk County and legislator Philip Nolan "because of a resolution authorizing the county executive to take action to halt sales and distribution" of the game. Oklahoma City, home to a large Native American population, also unanimously passed a resolution condemning the game as "distasteful" and "not in the best interests of the community". While both Ward 1 Councilman Bob McCoy and city attorney Walter Powell sought to block distribution within the city, and Multiple Industries did briefly halt distribution there, it was never officially banned by the city as is sometimes erroneously reported.

The number of copies sold is not well-established, with GameSource claiming 75,000 copies while Stuart Kesten reported 200,000. Atari received numerous complaints about the game, however, and responded by trying to sue the game's makers. Stuart Kesten, President of American Multiple Industries, stated "our object is not to arouse, our object is to entertain [...] When people play our games, we want them smiling, we want them laughing." The game's designer, Joel Martin, said Custer was "seducing" the maiden and that she was a "willing participant". By April 1983, the game was withdrawn from circulation.

== Reception ==
Videogaming & Computergaming Illustrated criticized the game, calling it “as boring as boring can be, consisting of simply running from screen left to screen right". Electronic Gaming Monthly's Seanbaby pointed out the crude graphics, stating that "there really was no point in trying to make erotic games" with the Atari 2600. They also called attention to the minimal gameplay and the outlandish premise. Overall, the game was ranked nine in their "20 worst games of all time" list.

In 1988, computer gaming magazine Ahoy! called Custer's Revenge "an [affront] to common decency", in contrast to more modern and 'tasteful' adult games. In 2008, the University of Calgary professor Tom Keenan cited "the hideous Custer's Revenge game", 26 years after its release, in an op-ed piece about current video game violence issues for the Calgary Herald. That same year, the game was credited by Australian PC Magazine as being one of the worst games ever made, while Games.net ranked Custer's victim as fifth on the list of top ten "disturbingly sexual" game characters. In 2010, Custer placed eighth on machinima.com's list of the top perverts in gaming. UGO.com ranked it as tenth on the list of the most racist video games in history in 2010, also ranking the game's General Custer as the second most unsexy video game character of all time in 2012.

== See also ==
- Cultural depictions of George Armstrong Custer
- RapeLay
- X-Man
- List of video games notable for negative reception
