= American Multiple Industries =

Former pornographic video game company

American Multiple Industries, doing business as Mystique, was a company that produced a line of pornographic video games for the Atari 2600 called Mystique Presents Swedish Erotica, which included the games Beat 'Em & Eat 'Em, Bachelor Party and Custer's Revenge. It was one of several video game companies that tried to use sexual content to sell its games.

== History ==
The brand name Swedish Erotica was licensed from a series of pornographic films by Caballero Control Corporation, although they were programmed in the U.S., manufactured in Hong Kong, and unrelated to Sweden. All Swedish Erotica games were developed by Joel H. Martin.

"I just don't believe adults want to shoot down rocket ships", AMI president Stuart Kesten said. According to industry watchers and critics, AMI's game designs were generally simple, with crude graphics typical for the time and unexceptional gameplay, most resembling already-existing non-pornographic games that were successful in their initial form.

== Controversy ==
AMI's most notorious title Custer's Revenge gained particular infamy for its plot. In the game, the player controls a caricature of George Armstrong Custer with a visible erection, wearing only a cowboy hat and boots. Custer has to overcome various obstacles in order to rape a crudely depicted, large-breasted Native American woman tied to a pole. The game prompted complaints from many activist groups — women's rights, anti-pornography, and Native American — alongside video game critics.

AMI exited the video game industry just before the video game crash of 1983. Its rights to the games were sold to the PlayAround spin-off company, which continued the pornographic game line.

== See also ==
- List of video games notable for negative reception
- Video game controversies
- Sexism in video gaming
- Gender representation in video games
