= PlayAround =

American video game company

- Industry: Video games
- Founder: Joel H. Martin
- Products: Beat 'Em and Eat 'Em / Philly Flasher; Burning Desire / Jungle Fever; Knight on the Town / Lady in Wading; Cathouse Blues / Gigolo; Bachelor Party / Bachelorette Party; General Retreat / Westward Ho!

PlayAround was an American video game developer founded by Joel H. Martin, co-founder of American Multiple Industries, (Note: Formal name, the company did business under the more familiar name Mystique) the first distinctly pornographic video game company.

PlayAround purchased the rights to American Multiple Industries' titles through the latter's bankruptcy during the video game crash of 1983, and re-released them as extra-long cartridges that had a different game on each end, named "double-enders". PlayAround's game development strategy was identical to that of its predecessor, which involved the creation of unlicensed pornographic Atari 2600 games. However, the majority of their new releases were graphical modifications that reversed the gender traits of its characters' sprites.

== List of PlayAround games ==
=== Beat 'Em and Eat 'Em/Philly Flasher ===
- In Beat 'Em and Eat 'Em, a man ejaculates from the top of a building, and the player controls two nude women on the ground to catch the man's semen in their mouths. The gameplay of Philly Flasher is identical, though the player controls two men catching breast milk from a lactating witch.

=== Burning Desire/Jungle Fever ===
- In Burning Desire, the player assumes the role of a nude man hovering over on a helicopter trying to save a woman from getting consumed by flames, while dodging stones being thrown at him by cannibals. He ejaculates to put out the fire, then he has the woman latch onto his penis and airs her to safety. In Jungle Fever, the roles are reversed and the player controls a woman who lactates the fire out.

=== Knight on the Town/Lady in Wading ===
- In Knight on the Town, one plays a knight who needs to get across the moat to save a buxom princess, but the only way across is for the knight to build a drawbridge, piece by piece. While building the bridge, the knight must dodge a dragon's fire, an alligator swimming in the moat and a little gremlin with a big mouth trying to bite the knight's blade off. To make matters worse, the gremlin moves faster for every piece of bridge placed. The goal of this game is to get across a completed drawbridge and climb to the top of the tower to get the princess in the least amount of time. For Lady in Wading, a studly prince is abducted and an Amazon takes the knight's place.

=== Cathouse Blues/Gigolo ===
- Both games are Memory-style games to test your memory. In Cathouse Blues, the playable character is a man on a mission to find and score with 7 different women in a large neighborhood and the women are paid upon finding the right house. However, there are empty houses with alarms that can stun him temporarily. Also wandering the streets are police officers ready to capture you. Also on hand is a mugger who chases after the man if he is carrying too much money. If the player runs into him, the game is over. In Gigolo, it's a woman who looks for 7 different men.

=== Bachelor/Bachelorette Party ===
- This game is similar to Breakout! and Arkanoid in gameplay, but instead of bricks and Pong balls, there are walls of nude women and a nude man to bounce around with a paddle. The roles are reversed in Bachelorette Party.

== General Re-Treat and Westward Ho! ==
Another double-ended game was released in Europe called General Retreat/Westward Ho!, but due to the multiple complaints, negative impact and protests that Custer's Revenge got, it was never released in the U.S. and stayed on European markets.
