= Solaris (video game) =

1986 video game

- Cover art by Terry Hoff
- Developer: Atari Corporation
- Publisher: Atari Corporation
- Programmer: Doug Neubauer
- Platform: Atari 2600
- Release: November 1986
- Genre: Space combat simulator
- Mode: Single-player

Solaris is a 1986 space combat video game developed and published by Atari Corporation for the Atari 2600. The game involves a player seeking out the planet Solaris via their starship. To accomplish this, the player must navigate the galactic scanner to explore quadrants of a map. Doing so allows them to explore Federation planets to refuel their ship, and engage in combat with hostile aliens known as the Zylons.

The game was programmed by Doug Neubauer, who had previously made Star Raiders (1980) for the Atari 8-bit home computers for Atari and various film tie-in games for the Atari 2600 for Fox Video Games. Neubauer pitched this game to Atari in 1984, who planned to make it a tie-in to the film The Last Starfighter (1984). Following Jack Tramiel's purchase of Atari, Inc.'s assets in 1984, Atari's production of console games was halted and the game languished in development hell. Neubauer was only contacted in 1986 to complete his work on Solaris following the release of a new remodeled Atari 2600.

Contemporary and retrospective reviews of Solaris have seen critics from AllGame, Computer Entertainer and Retro Gamer praise it as having some of the best graphics for an Atari 2600 game. Reviewers in Retro Gamer called it one of the best games for the system.

== Gameplay ==
In Solaris, the goal of the game is to survive battles with enemy aliens called Zylons as they seek out the planet Solaris. The player pilots a starship exploring outer space and visiting the surface of planets. The game contains a map of 16 total quadrants with 48 sectors. It is navigated via the Galactic Scanner map screen, which represents where the player is located within the galaxy. The player can utilize the map to identify sectors they would like to travel to. If the player picks a Zylon-infested sector, they must destroy all the enemy ships, allowing them to return to the map. Other areas feature star clusters, mine fields and traversable wormholes that lead to other quadrants. If the player chooses to travel to a planet, they navigate its surface, allowing them to attack aliens, rescue humans, and dock at refueling stations.

Federation planets appear with docking stations to refuel the spaceship. If a Federation planet is invaded by Zylons, the player must use their ship to shoot all the aliens and rescue the occupied planet. When Zylons attack a federation planet within the current quadrant, the player has 40 seconds to defend the planet before the aliens successfully occupy it. If the player fails to do so, the Galactic Scanner quadrant will become red. Zylon planets feature stranded space cadets, which can be rescued for bonus points. They also feature corridors protected by Zylon guardians. Once inside a corridor, the player must fly over a key to ensure safe passage through, which will result in the destruction of the planet and additional points.

== Development ==
Prior to working on Solaris, Doug Neubauer worked at Atari, Inc., where he made the computer game Star Raiders (1980), and later as an independent contractor for 20th Century Fox's new video game division Fox Video Games, making film tie-in games for the Atari 2600. Among the games he developed for Fox were Alien, Mega Force and M*A*S*H. Neubauer hoped that making several film tie-in games would lead to him developing a game based on Star Wars. He found later that "just because a company makes a movie doesn't mean they have the rights to make a video game of the movie, Case in point, Star Wars. They didn't have the rights to it."

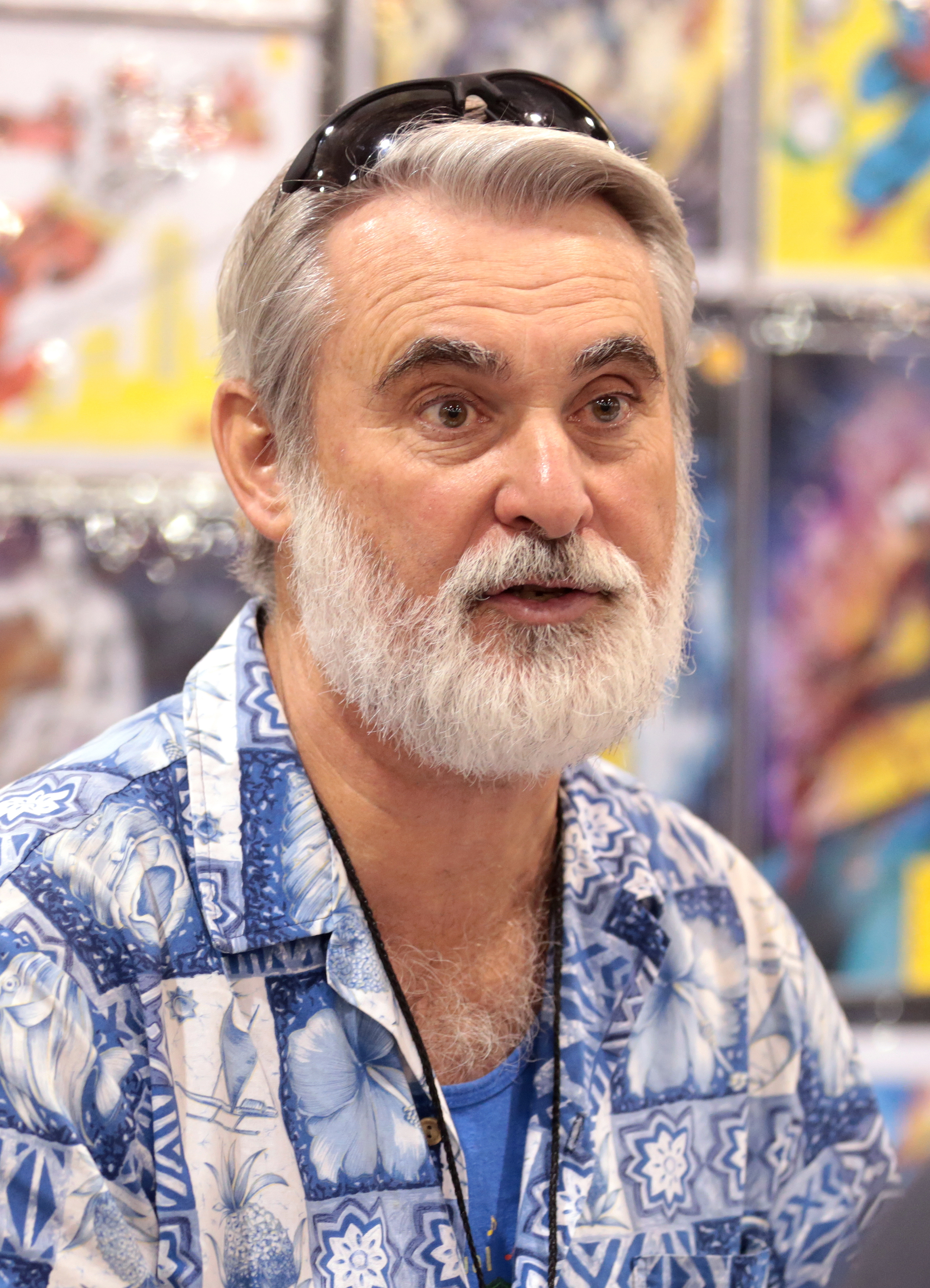
Comic book inker Randy Emberlin (pictured in 2018) assisted his cousin, programmer Doug Neubauer, with the graphics in Solaris.

Douglas Neubauer pitched Solaris to Atari in 1984. The company suggested making it into a video game tie-in for the film The Last Starfighter (1984). Atari flew Neubauer to Los Angeles for a screening of the film, but he soon found out that Jack Tramiel had bought the company and most of the staff was laid off. Neubauer described these lay offs as appearing like "the end of video games for Atari." Upon Tramiel's acquisition of the Atari consumer division and launch of the Atari ST computer line, Tramiel began focusing on reviving the Atari 2600. He hired Michael Katz from Epyx in November 1985 to take on the role of president for Atari's new Entertainment Electronics Division. The Atari 2600 was experiencing what video game historian Brett Weiss described as "a resurgence of sorts" following the video game company Nintendo's financial success with their Nintendo Entertainment System (NES) console. Atari would respond with re-releasing the Atari 2600 as a smaller, budget-priced revision in January 1986. In the same year, Atari would reconnect with Neubauer to revive his game, now titled Solaris.

Mike Bevan wrote in Retro Gamer that fans of Neubauer's game Star Raiders (1980) sometimes considered Solaris to be the "true successor" to that game. Neubauer responded that the game is not a sequel. Solaris was made with 16K of bank-switching ROM and 256 bytes of RAM. Neubauer had his cousin, professional comic artist Randy Emberlin, help him with the graphics for the game. Solaris was completed by October 1986. Neubauer said that he gave Atari the "master EPROM" of the game and his engineering notes. He then found himself surprised that his brief write-ups and what he described as his "primitive little sketches" were taken nearly verbatim for the games manual. Neubauer joked decades later in an interview that "apparently Atari was cash-strapped at the time, but so strapped they couldn't afford a graphics artist?" The cover art of the game also reused illustrations from the Atari 2600 box art of Star Raiders (1982).

== Release ==
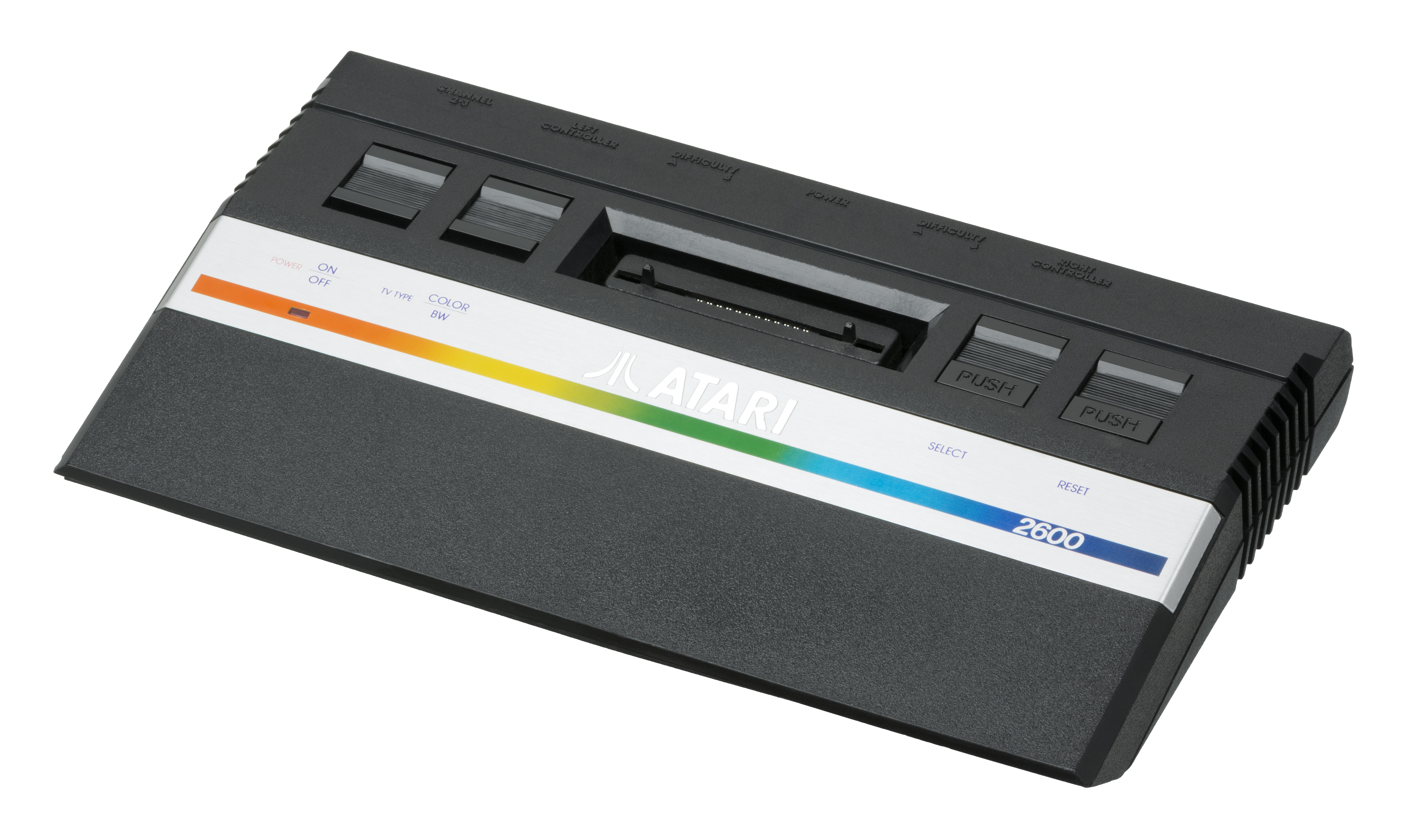
In 1986, Atari released a budget-priced revision of the Atari 2600 (pictured), and began releasing new games such as Solaris.

At the Consumer Electronics Show in June 1986, Atari's promotion booth included console games for both the Atari 7800 and Atari 2600 consoles. Midnight Magic, Pac-Man Jr. and Solaris were showcased in playable form at the event and were set to be available to consumers before the end of the 1986. Solaris was released for the Atari 2600 in November 1986. In June 1989, Electronic Gaming Monthly reported that it was the top-selling available game for either the Atari 2600 or Atari 7800 in the United States during that month.

Solaris was re-released in various Atari-themed compilations years later. These included being on the first release of the Atari Flashback series of dedicated consoles in November 2004. It was later released to other devices and software such as the Nintendo Switch, PlayStation 4, Xbox One, and Steam services as part of video game compilation Atari 50 (2022).

== Reception and legacy ==
From contemporary reviews, a reviewer in The Video Game Update gave Solaris their highest rating of four stars for both graphics and gameplay. The review proclaimed the game was "strong enough to hold its own in an era of game systems far greater capabilities than the modest 2600" and that "Without question Solaris is the best space game ever done for this system." A reviewer in the German magazine Power Play wrote that Solaris surprised them, and while they did not find the gameplay original, they complimented the beautiful and varied graphics, finding it superior to the similarly themed Atari 2600 game Starmaster (1982).

A launch and landing sequence in Solaris. Critics from The Video Game Update, AllGame, and Retro Gamer and others have declared as having some of the best graphics for any game on the Atari 2600.

From retrospective reviews, several reviewers complimented the graphics as being among the best for the Atari 2600. An anonymous reviewer in the British magazine Retro Gamer said that "the real feature of Solaris that will make your jaw drop is the visuals. You would have never thought it was possible for the 2600 to display high-res graphics in so many colours." and that the game was "widely regarded as the console's most technically impressive commercial release." Kieren Hawken, also of Retro Gamer, praised the sound, visuals and gameplay depth, stating that "Solaris is quite simply the best game for the 2600 bar none." In the magazine's list of the top 25 Atari 2600 games, Stuart Hunt and Darran Jones listed Solaris; they noted that, while the gameplay would take some getting used to, the game "can be heralded as one of the finest pieces of code written for the 2600." Weiss wrote in his book Classic Home Video Games 1972-1984 that Solaris was one of the more ambitious games in the Atari 2600 library in terms of graphics and gameplay, specifically noting the multi-colored enemies, beautifully illustrated planets, and variety of sound effects. Jonathan Sutyak, writing for the online game database AllGame, found the graphics were "the Atari 2600 at its best" but disliked the gameplay. Sutyak found it overtly complicated and concluded that "trying to make sense of everything [in Solaris] is not worth your time or effort."

Following its release, Neubauer went on to make other Atari 2600 games, including Super Football and Radar Lock. He had attempted to make a space-oriented game for the NES that was never published, saying that "the days of one programmer doing a complete game were over, and by the time I got the game done, the NES was obsolete." When comparing the game to Star Raiders, Neubauer thought the original Star Raiders had better game play and preferred its cockpit point of view over Solaris. He later summarized his career in video games development, concluding that "the best games I did were the ones I did for fun rather than money. Probably a lesson there."

== See also ==
- List of Atari 2600 games
