= The Last Starfighter (disambiguation) =

The Last Starfighter is a 1984 American space opera film directed by Nick Castle.

The Last Starfighter may also refer to the following, all based on the 1984 film:

- The Last Starfighter (soundtrack), the score and soundtrack album
- The Last Starfighter (Atari video game), a cancelled video game for the Atari VCS, 2600 and 8-bit computers, released in modified form as "Star Raiders II"
- The Last Starfighter (NES video game), a video game for the Nintendo Entertainment System
