= Star Raiders =

1980 video game

- Atari 8-bit cover art
- Developer: Atari, Inc.
- Publishers: Atari, Inc.
- Programmer: Doug Neubauer
- Platforms: Atari 8-bit, Atari 2600, Atari 5200, Atari ST
- Release: March 1980: Atari 400/800; March 1980; Atari 2600; September 1982; Atari 5200; January 1983
- Genre: Space combat simulator
- Mode: Single-player

Star Raiders is a space combat simulator video game created by Doug Neubauer and published in 1980 by Atari, Inc. Originally released for the Atari 400/800 computers, Star Raiders was later ported to the Atari 2600, Atari 5200, and Atari ST. The player assumes the role of a starship fighter pilot, who must protect starbases from invading forces called Zylons. Piloting and combat are shown in the 3D cockpit view, while a 2D galactic map shows the state of the Zylon invasion. Neubauer made the game in his spare time at Atari, inspired by contemporary media such as Battlestar Galactica and Star Wars, as well as the 1971 mainframe game Star Trek.

Star Raiders became one of the most successful games on Atari's 400 and 800 computers, and their first killer app. It influenced space combat games such as Elite (1984) and Wing Commander (1990), as well as spawning an official sequel and a 2011 remake. Star Raiders was included in a list of ten games that were submitted as a game canon to the Library of Congress in 2007.

== Plot and gameplay ==
Gameplay footage of the Atari 5200 version of Star Raiders. This footage shows the galactic map, the hyperwarp, a battle with a Zylon ship and long-range scan.

Star Raiders is a space combat simulator set during a galactic war between the Atarian Federation and the Zylon Empire. The player assumes the role of the captain of the Elite Atarian Starship fleet, fighting the Zylons before they eliminate humanity. To win, the player must destroy the Zylon ships before they destroy the Atarian ship and before their own ship runs out of energy.

Star Raiders is controlled using both a keyboard and a joystick. It is primarily experienced from a first-person, 3D cockpit view and larger, 2D map overviews for long-distance travel. The player can control the speed of travel in space, and the angle of display (rear and front-views), and engage a mini-display called the Attack Computer Display that displays the coordinates of enemy ships and other targets. In action sequences, the player will sometimes avoid or destroy asteroids before they damage their starship, while battling enemy ships using photon torpedoes. In this mode, the control panel displays the player's velocity, energy, number of kills, and remaining targets; Energy is consumed by traversing space, using shields, and firing photon torpedoes; energy can be restored by matching coordinates with a friendly starbase.

The player can activate a long-range scanner, which displays a top-down view of their ship and nearby targets. When the long-range scan is damaged, the player will see the objects in the area and false reflections of them. The player can also view a galactic chart, indicating the player's location, enemy ships, and friendly star bases. The player engages the hyper-warp to visit new sectors. A subspace radio delivers messages through the galactic chart when star bases are surrounded or destroyed. Six types of equipment can be damaged in action, which is tracked using the acronym PESCLR (for photon torpedoes, engines, shields, computer, long-range scan, and radio). Damaged equipment will affect gameplay, engine damage, for example, slows ship's movement.

Star Raiders' skill levels are Novice, Pilot, Warrior, and Commander. On high-difficulty levels, during hyperwarp moments, players must manually navigate their ship using crosshairs while warping. Zylon ships will move faster and strike more deliberately, with less randomness in their attack algorithm.

== Development ==
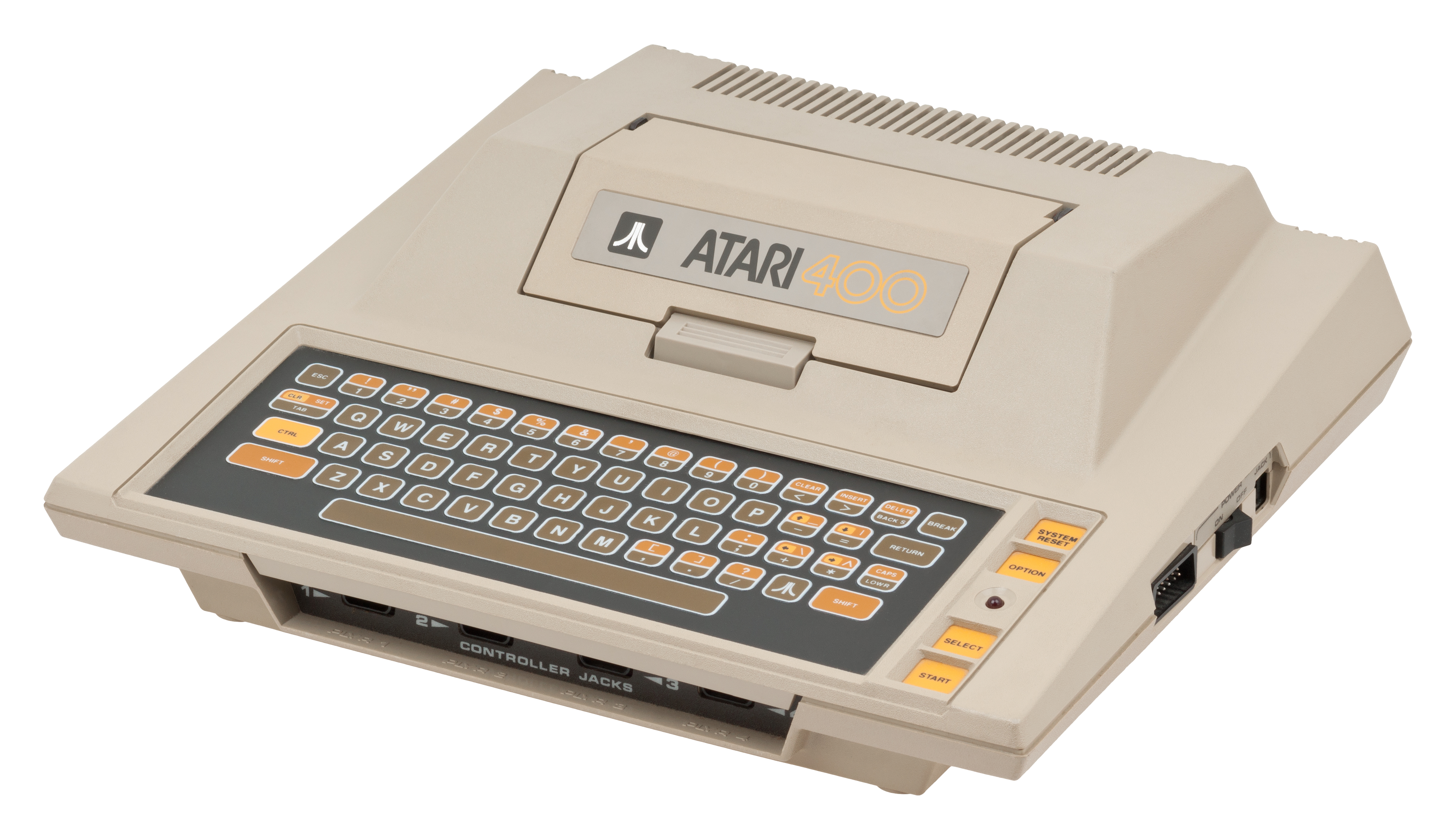
Atari 400

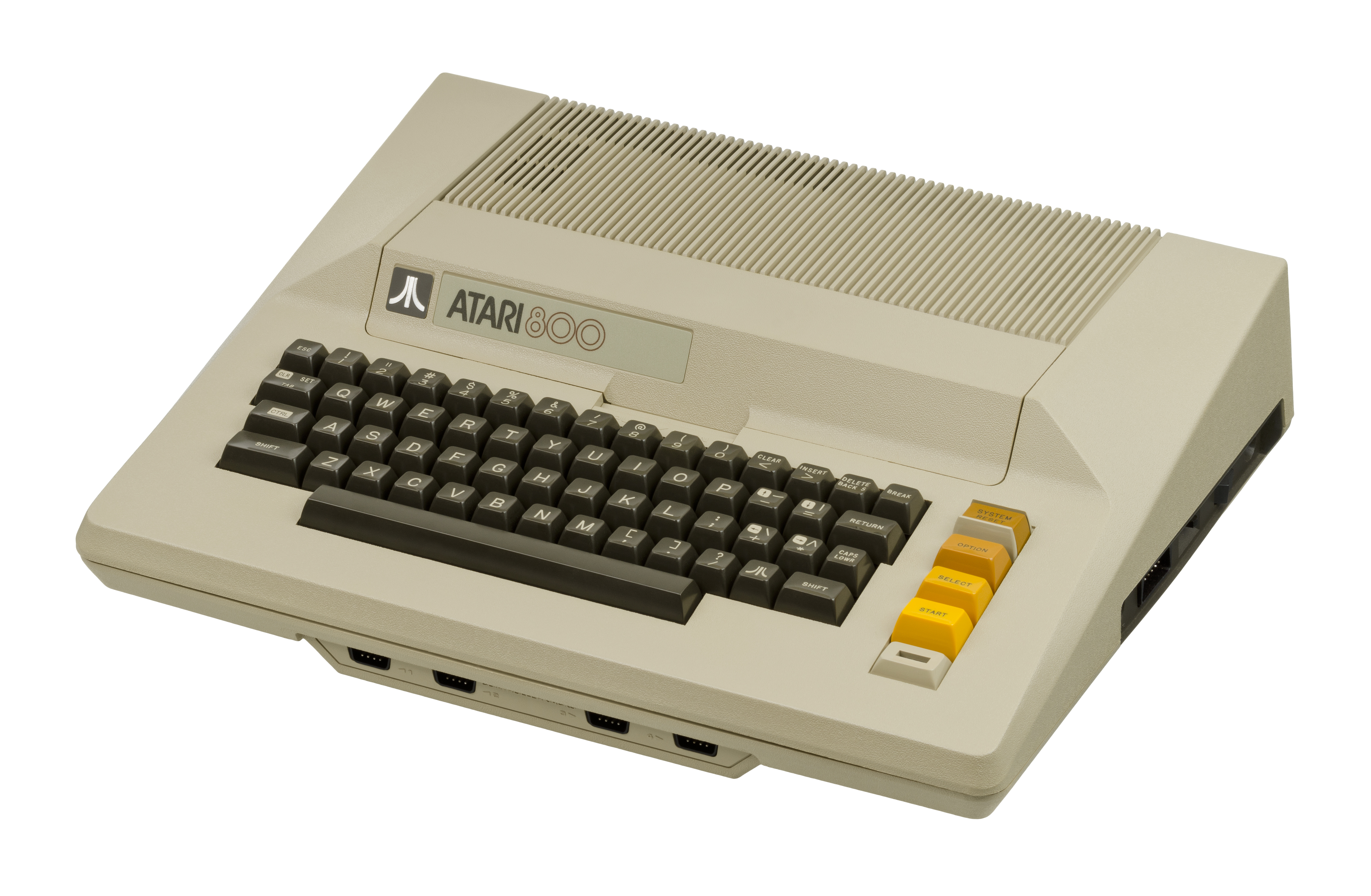
Atari 800

Star Raiders was developed for the Atari 400 and 800, the first Atari 8-bit computers.

Doug Neubauer worked as an electrical engineer before creating Star Raiders. While working at National Semiconductor, Neubauer programmed scenes with star backgrounds.

National canceled its home computer projects, leading Neubauer to move to Atari, where design manager Richard Simone hired him. Neubauer became a key figure in the development of the POKEY sound chip, used in the Atari 400 and 800 computers. Using the sound chip he created, Neubauer tried to emulate the sound effects from Star Trek, such as explosions, engines, and photon torpedoes.

During a period where Atari had fewer hardware design needs, supervisor Jay Miner allowed Neubauer to work on software that eventually developed into Star Raiders. Neubauer said he "just did [Star Raiders] for fun" and that "Atari was pretty laid back...I think Star Raiders, along with other early games, helped in finding any bugs in the Atari 400/800 chips". Development began in early 1979; Neubauer finished the game after eight to ten months.

Neubauer was inspired to make the game after discovering the text-based game Star Trek (1971). He said that it "just didn't look that interesting to play", but liked the idea of the galactic chart within the game. Neubauer wanted to create something that resembled 3D space combat for the system, and was inspired by science-fiction films such as 2001: A Space Odyssey (1968), THX 1138 (1971) and Star Wars (1977). He also cited the television series Battlestar Galactica (1978) as an influence, specifically for the name of the Zylon enemies. Other game visuals such as the 3D cockpit point of view and the hyper warp were influenced by Star Trek and Star Wars.

Neubauer asked fellow employees if they had algorithms for 3D motion, with no success. This led him to spend weeks figuring out the equations without using sine and cosine, which he achieved using pen and paper. After figuring out an algorithm for 3D motion, Neubauer quickly developed a star field and explosions for the game. He described his code for it as "crummy 16-bit multiplier code" that slowed down the game during the explosions. Neubauer did not know how to use the graphics capabilities of the Atari 800 computer, and could only make the screen display two enemies at once. Neubauer initially designed the hyper warp system to involve calculations inspired by Isaac Asimov's The Stars, Like Dust (1951), but decided to abandon it as "a dumb idea in terms of gameplay for an action game". The way enemies attacked star bases was also changed during development because Neubauer's algorithm would sometimes make them adhere to the map while approaching star bases. This led him to add random variations to their paths to stop them adhering to the map. Due to the limited memory in the ROM cartridge, Neubauer also abandoned a feature that would allow players to dock at star bases.

At the end of Star Raiders, the player is ranked using humorous titles such as "Galactic Cook", "Garbage Scow Captain" and "Star Commander (Class 1)". Neubauer did not want a number-score system and instead applied a military ranking with humorous ratings to poorly performing players. One week before the game was to be ported to ROM cartridges, Neubauer was adjusting the difficulty of the game to earn certain rankings; playing at Commander difficulty is necessary for the higher ranks. He stated the game had "a lot of ugly spaghetti code" so Star Raiders could run on less-expensive Atari 400 computers and fit on an eight-kilobyte cartridge.

== Release ==
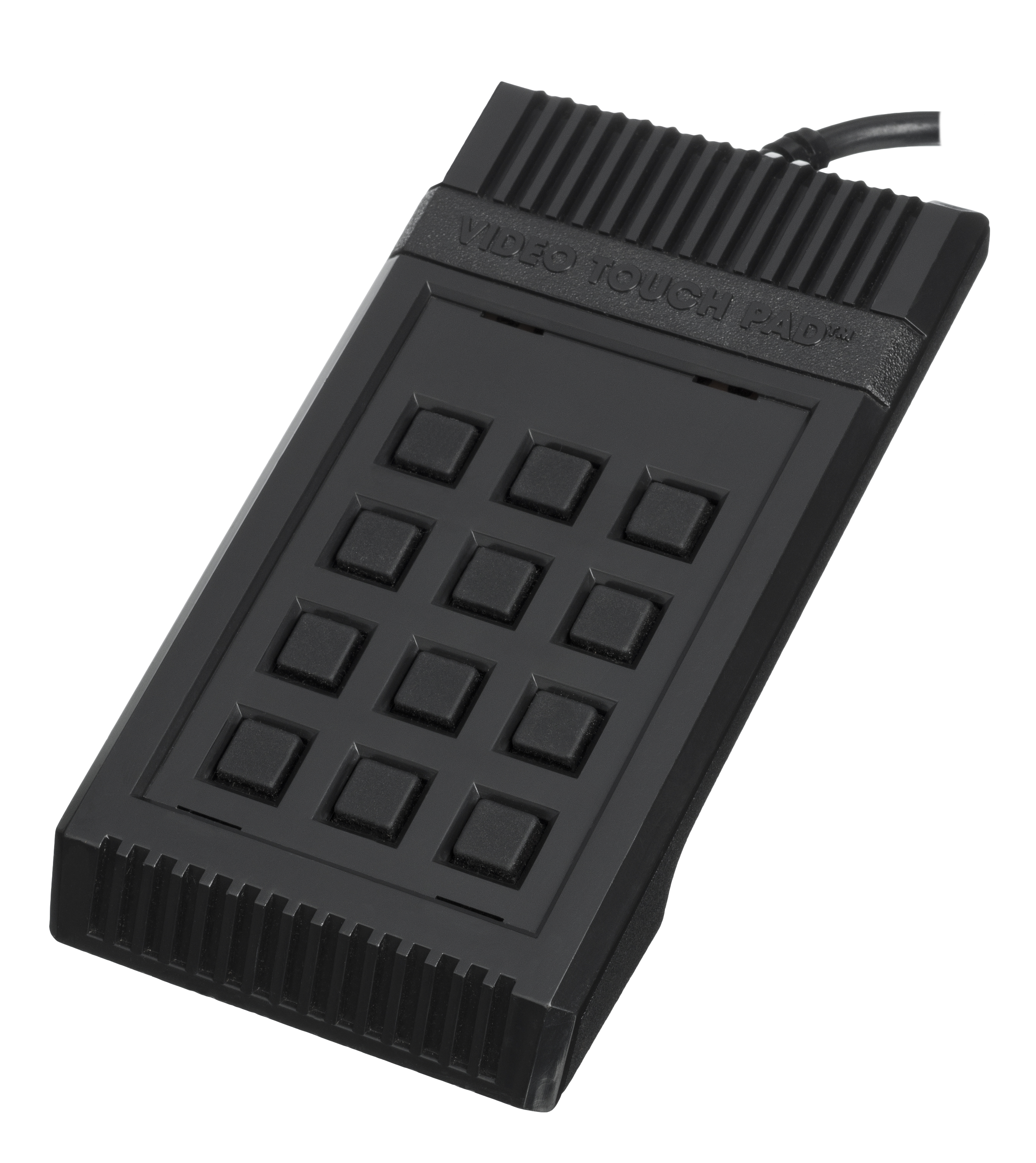
The Atari 2600 version shipped with the Video Touch Pad controller.

Star Raiders was released in March 1980. Stating that the game "drove marketing crazy", Joe Decuir attributed the decision to include a keyboard on the Atari 400 in part to the strong internal reaction to the game. A port was released for the Atari 2600 in 1982, featuring an eight-button touch pad.

The following year, the game was ported to Atari 5200, becoming the first game to use all 12 buttons on the console's gamepad. A 16-bit version of Star Raiders was released for the Atari ST computers.

The Atari 2600 version of the game was re-released in various compilations, such as the Atari 80 in One for Windows in 2003 and the Atari Anthology for PlayStation 2 and Xbox in 2004. The Atari 5200 version was included as part of the Atari 50 (2022) compilation for Nintendo Switch, PlayStation 4, Steam, and Xbox One. This port of the game included additional content such as overlays that show player status and rumble effects when entering hyperspace.

== Reception ==
Atari 400 and 800 Ratings

Review scores
Publication	Score
The Complete Guide to Electronic Games	5/5
Electronic Fun with Computers & Games	4/4

By October 1982, the Atari 2600 port of Star Raiders was among the sixth-best-selling console releases and continued to be a top-ten release in November.

=== Contemporaneous ===
Star Raiders received positive reviews from various computer publications such as InfoWorld, Softline, and Byte. Joretta Klepfer of Compute! did not find the game intuitive, but noted that it was both exciting to play and watch, praising the 3D gameplay, use of color and sound. Jerry Pournelle reported that at the West Coast Computer Faire and National Computer Conference, "the most popular exhibit was Atari's ... boy did they stand in line for Star Raiders".

David C. Cole of InfoWorld said the game is "graphically rich" and noted its addictive qualities and challenge. Cole noted difficulty in the game, stating in more-difficult modes if the ship is damaged it is nearly impossible to locate a base for repairs. An anonymous reviewer in Softline also noted the game's replay ability and challenge, while describing the game as bigger and better than its peers made for the Atari 2600. The review concluded; "the game stands repeat play well and remains quite difficult". Henry Allen echoed the praise in The Washington Post, saying Star Raiders is like "the best possible combination of a shooting gallery and a planetarium".

Greg Williams of Byte proclaimed "no one – I repeat, no one – has created either a home-computer game or a coin-operated video game that is better than Star Raiders"." He praised its 3D gameplay, color, sound, and controls while stating "the feature that gives it life is its real-time animation". Williams concluded, "to all software vendors, this is the game you have to surpass to get our attention". The magazine's Curtis P. Feigel called Star Raiders "the first, and so far the best ... 'sit-in-'em'" game. The author praised the comprehensiveness of its simulation of a one-man combat spacecraft, with plausible equipment, communications, vehicle damage, and flight. In his book The Complete Guide to Electronic Games (1981), Howard J. Blumenthal suggested players that it was worth the time to learn the controls in the game as the game was "not only is it fun-it's fascinating." and "an adventure far more engaging than even the best of the video games." In Electronic Games, Bill Kunkel and Frank Laney found the game similar to previous Star Trek-styled games but said; "it is far superior to all past efforts in this field" and is the game that "best demonstrates the outstanding videogame and computer capabilities of 6502-based machines".

From contemporaneous reviews of the game's ports, The Video Game Update called it a "classic space game", while criticizing the Atari 2600 version's relative quality. Tim Onosko of The Capital Times wrote that the Atari 2600 version was poorly made with inadequate graphics, stating Activision's similar game Starmaster was superior. The Video Game Update later reviewed the Atari 5200 version of Star Raiders, finding it to be essentially the same as the original home-computer game, and calling "unquestionably one of the best space games in existence." Jack Schofield of The Guardian gave a negative review to the Atari ST version, stating the improved graphics do not make Star Raiders a better game and that the original is "still a brilliant game".

=== Retrospective ===
InfoWorld's Essential Guide to Atari Computers cited Star Raiders as "the most famous in the Atari world", but "one of the least realistic". Star Raiders was included in GameSpot's series "The Great Games of All Time"; writer Jeff Gerstmann stated the game has a level of complexity that is usually only found within text adventures of the era and that it launched the space simulation genre.

In the March 1983 issue of Softline, readers voted for Star Raiders as the best program for Atari computers, with 45% more ballots than the second-place contender Jawbreaker (1981). In 1995, Flux magazine ranked the original computer version of Star Raiders 46th on its list of "Top 100 Video Games". Decuir said in 2019 that Star Raiders was the best original Atari 8-bit game.

From retrospective reviews of the game ports, Mike Bevan of Retro Gamer referred to the Atari 2600 version as a "rather weak port" with a smaller galactic chart. The game was more expensive than the average Atari 2600 game because it included a touch-pad controller. Jeff Gerstmann of GameSpot stated the Atari 2600 version "was pretty good on its own, but one look at the Atari 400/800 version of the game was all it took to sour someone on the Atari 2600 version forever". A 16-bit version of Star Raiders was released for the Atari ST computers; according to Bevan, the controls feel "floaty", low-quality graphics, and the game was slower-paced than the original.

== Legacy ==
Star Raiders prompted several clones following its release. These include Phaser Patrol, Starmaster, Space Spartans, Sentinel, and Codename MAT. Schofield stated in 1986 Codename Mat and Sentinel were the better attempts. Phil Garson of Electronic Fun with Computers & Games said in 1982 review of Star Raiders that while there were many similar games on the market, "none has come close to the original."

According to Barton and Loguidice, Star Raiders established many conventions that would be part of the space simulation genre that would rise with later games such as Elite (1984), Star Control (1990), and Wing Commander (1990).

Barton and Loguidice described Star Raiders is one of the best-known games for Atari's 400 and 800 computers. The game remained popular throughout the 1980s; in 1987, readers of The Computer Entertainer voted for Star Raiders as the 14th favorite game of all time. While Byte called it "probably the single greatest contributor to the sales of Atari's 400 and 800 series computers", and Gamasutra retroactively named it as the first killer app computer game, Star Raiders's popularity contributed to the perception that Atari 8-bit were game machines like the Atari 2600, and not serious computers. When asked about the popularity of the game in 1986, Neubauer said: "It's pretty amazing, the way the game caught on. I think it was the first game to combine action with a strategy screen, and, luckily, the concept worked out pretty well." Neubauer also said the game "looks pretty primitive" by 1986 standards.

In 2007, Henry Lowood, the curator of the History of Science and Technology Collections at Stanford University, created a project to preserve video games. Lolwood submitted a list of games to the Library of Congress through a committee that included himself, game designers Warren Spector and Steve Meretzky, Matteo Bittanti, and Joystiq journalist Christopher Grant. Star Raiders was included in their initial game canon of ten submitted video games.

=== Follow-ups ===
Atari did not pay royalties to its developers, including Neubauer. He left the company but later did contract work for it. Atari later released Star Raiders II for several home computer systems. Bevan wrote in Retro Gamer that fans of Star Raiders sometimes considered Neubauer's 1986 Atari 2600 game Solaris to be the "true successor" to the original game. Neubauer explained that Solaris was not a sequel, and that he preferred Star Raiders for its gameplay, cockpit view, and explosion graphics. In 1994, Atari promoted a game called Star Raiders 2000 for the Atari Jaguar that was later retitled Space War 2000. The game was later cancelled.

In 1983, a comic based on the game titled Star Raiders was published by DC Comics. The comic started as part of a cancelled project to adapt various popular Atari games as comic books. The Star Raiders concept survived and was handed to artist José Luis García-López and writer Elliot Maggin who was "eager to do the project" as a fan of the game.

Years later, Incinerator Studios developed a new version of Star Raiders, which was released in 2011. On the game's release, it received "generally unfavorable reviews" according to Metacritic. Carolyn Petit of GameSpot compared the new version of game to the original, stating the original game is complex and ambitious with a sense of humor while the new version "possesses none of the ambition or fun of its namesake".

== See also ==
- List of Atari, Inc. games (1972–1984)
- List of space flight simulation games
- List of Atari 2600 games
