= Doug Neubauer =

American video game designer

- Born: 1953 or 1954 (age 72–73)
- Occupations: Integrated circuit designer Video game designer Programmer
- Notable work: POKEY sound chip Star Raiders (Atari 8-bit); Solaris (Atari 2600)
- Relatives: Randy Emberlin (cousin)
- Website: dougneubauer1.wordpress.com

Doug Neubauer is an American integrated circuit designer, video game designer, and programmer. Following graduation for Oregon State University and working at National Semiconductor, Neubauer worked at Atari, Inc. where he would develop the logic design on Atari's POKEY chip and designing and programming the video game Star Raiders (1980) both for the Atari 8-bit computer line. Star Raiders would go on to become one of the best-known games for Atari's 8-bit computers.

Neubauer left Atari and worked for several companies such as Hewlett-Packard and developing video games for 20th Century Fox based on popular films for the Atari 2600 video game system. He would make more follow-ups for the system for Atari in the later half of the 1980s such as Solaris (1986). After attempting to work on a Nintendo Entertainment System video game, Neubauer left the video game industry stating that "the days of one programmer doing a complete game were over, and by the time I got the game done, the NES was obsolete." He worked at Integrated Information Technology in the early 1990s as a hardware designer.

== Career ==
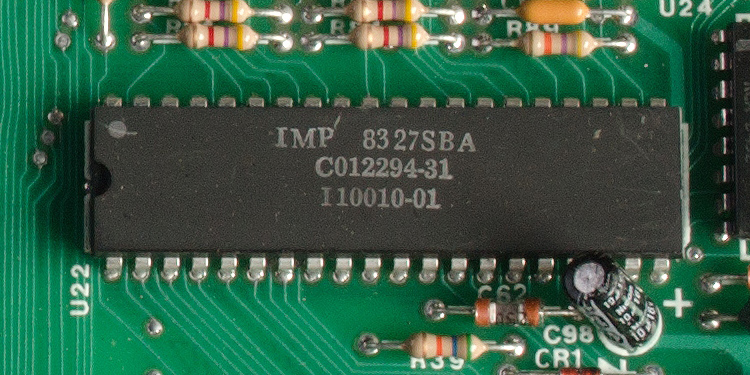
The POKEY chip provides audio generation and keyboard and game controller support for the Atari-8-bit computers.

Neubauer earned a Bachelor of Science in Electrical Engineering from Oregon State University. He worked on coin-op carnival-style games and became interested in video games after seeing the arcade video game Computer Space (1971). After graduation, Neubauer began work at National Semiconductor. At the company, they began work on early video game work with the company attempting to develop a home video game system. The project was cancelled as the company felt they couldn't compete with Atari and their home computer line, which led to Neubauer and many others to leave National Semiconductor to work for Atari.

At Atari, Neuabuer worked on the Potentiometer and Keyboard (POKEY) chip. It had the keyboard interface, paddle controller interface, serial port and audio. Following the completion of the chip, he began working on a game on wire-wrap development systems that would become Star Raiders (1980); a project that Neubauer said he "just did it for fun". The game became a hit, but Neubauer did not receive royalties. He left Atari and worked for Hewlett-Packard and later as an independent contractor for 20th Century Fox's new game division, making Atari 2600 video games based on films, such as Alien (1982) and M*A*S*H (1983). Neubauer hoped to make a Star Wars game but Fox did not have the video game license, and the division closed after the video game crash of 1983.

Neubauer pitched Solaris to Atari in 1984. The company suggested making it into a video game tie-in for the film The Last Starfighter (1984). Neubauer attended a screening of the film, but Jack Tramiel had bought Atari and most of the staff was laid off. Neubauer described these lay offs as appearing like "the end of video games for Atari"; he joined Imagen, an image processing and laser printer company doing chip and system design.

Atari re-released the Atari 2600 as a smaller, budget-priced console in January 1986. The company asked Neubauer revive his game, now titled Solaris; cousin and comic book artist Randy Emberlin provided art. Neubauer made other Atari 2600 games, including Super Football and Radar Lock. He attempted to make a space-oriented game for the Nintendo Entertainment System (NES) that was never published, saying that "the days of one programmer doing a complete game were over, and by the time I got the game done, the NES was obsolete". Neubauer was the video hardware design manager at Integrated Information Technology in 1992.

In 2007, Henry Lowood, the curator of the History of Science and Technology Collections at Stanford University, created a project to preserve video games. Lolwood submitted a list of games to the Library of Congress through a committee that included himself, game designers Warren Spector and Steve Meretzky, Matteo Bittanti, and Joystiq journalist Christopher Grant. Neubauer's Star Raiders was included in their initial game canon of ten submitted video games.
