= Star Raiders (2011 video game) =

2011 video game

- Developer: Incinerator Studios
- Publisher: Atari, Inc.
- Producer: Jonathan Moses
- Platforms: Windows, Xbox 360, PlayStation 3
- Release: Windows, Xbox 360: WW: May 11, 2011; PlayStation 3: NA: June 1, 2011; EU: June 29, 2011
- Genre: Space combat
- Modes: Single-player, multiplayer

Star Raiders is a video game for the Xbox 360, PlayStation 3, and Microsoft Windows. Developed by Incinerator Studios, it was published in May 2011 by Atari, Inc. It is a re-imagining of 1980's Star Raiders which was the killer app for the Atari 8-bit computers. The remake is an action, first-person spaceship combat game in which the player travels through a starfield in pursuit of the enemy Zylons. It adds a new storyline, customizable ships, and multiplayer gameplay with several modes.

== Gameplay ==

Star Raiders features a storyline very similar to that of the 1979 video game. The Zylons, an alien race bent on humanity's destruction, are moving their forces towards Earth, and it is up to the player to repel their assault and save the human race. The player's ship is a small space fighter, but with the capability to transform itself to deal with a variety of situations. The forms include these: a dogfighting ship, capable of close and quick battles with other Zylon dogfighters; an assault form that is good at destroying larger, more powerful enemy ships; and a turret form, for destroying the largest Zylon ships from the inside.

All of these forms are needed, as the Zylons dramatically outnumber the player, both in numbers and size of their ships. Aside from fighters of similar size, the Zylons have cruisers and frigates to confront the player, as well as their largest ship, the Basestar. Players can defeat the other three types of ships with conventional weaponry, but have to travel inside the Basestar and destroy certain key points to finally eliminate it.

The gameplay unfolds along a galactic map, as players choose which missions they want to undertake to defeat the Zylon threat. Missions involve the players dogfighting with Zylon forces in a variety of settings, from an asteroid field to gigantic space elevators, and end when all the Zylon ships are eliminated. Once the mission is completed, players can return to the area if they so choose, to find ore for upgrading their weapons and shields.

== Reception ==
Reception

Review scores
Publication	Score
GameSpot	3.0/10
Official Xbox Magazine (US)	5.5/10
Impulse Gamer	5.0/10

The game received generally poor reviews. Metacritic gave a score of 35 out of 100. GamingXP said, "Star Raiders gets boring way too quickly and fails to motivate you to play on." Multiplayer.it said, "A mediocre, boring space shooter. Some ideas are interesting, but clunky controls and uninspired visuals makes this title a complete waste."

GameSpot says the game has "woefully inadequate tutorials, dull dogfights, bland visuals and annoying sound effects". One of the main actions in the game, which is destroying capital ships, is described as "painfully tedious".
