= Space War 2000 =

- Developer: Atari Corporation
- Publishers: Original release: NA/EU: Atari Corporation; Relaunch: WW: B&C Computervisions
- Designers: Chris Thompson; Lance J. Lewis; Robert Zdybel
- Platform: Atari Jaguar
- Release: Original release: NA/EU: Cancelled; Relaunch: WW: September 2001
- Genres: First-person shooter, space combat simulation
- Modes: Single-player, multiplayer

Space War 2000 is an unreleased first-person space combat simulation video game developed and originally planned to be published by Atari Corporation on a scheduled November 1995 release date exclusively for the Atari Jaguar. It is an update by Robert Zdybel of Ian Shepard's 1978 Atari 2600 game Space War. In the game, players assume the role of a space knight to fight against other opponents.

Space War 2000 was first announced in 1994 under the working title Star Raiders 2000, however it was renamed at one point during its development due to drifting away from its original source material, Star Raiders. Although showcased at various trading shows and nearly completed for launch, the game was ultimately shelved in favor of 4Play's BattleSphere due to poor internal reception from test players. Despite being unreleased, a playable prototype has since been released and sold online by independent groups such as B&C Computervisions.

== Gameplay ==
Beta gameplay screenshot

Space War 2000 is a first-person shooter with space combat simulation elements similar to Star Raiders, Elite and Wing Commander, where players assume the role of a knight in order to face opponents on space dogfights. Though the single-player campaign can be played normally and some of the options in the main menu operate without issues, players cannot access menu screens such as the shop to buy new weapons and the two-player split screen deathmatch mode due to its unfinished nature. In single-player, players battle against other enemies while avoiding asteroids and other hazards during gameplay. Players can also change between multiple viewpoints to see their surroundings.

== History ==
Space War 2000 was first announced in 1994 under the working title Star Raiders 2000 and was also showcased to the public during SCES 1994 in a very early state. However, according to Atari Explorer Online writers Keita Iida and Tal Funke-Bilu, the project drifted away from its original source material (Star Raiders), which led to Atari Corporation change its name to Space War. Though not much information was initially revealed, both Atari Corp. and Atari Explorer Online later revealed that the title was being worked on by Atari veteran Robert Zdybel, who worked on several releases such as Warbirds on Atari Lynx, as well as Atari tester Lance J. Lewis portraying the game's three-eyed character. Lance also revealed in a 2005 interview with The Atari Times website that Chris Thompson also served as artist during development of the project. It was later renamed to Space War 2000 in early 1995 and slated for a summer launch.

Space War 2000 was then showcased in a playable state at Atari's booth during the WCES 1995, with plans for a March/April 1995 release window. German magazine MAN!AC later reported that the game was scheduled for a Q2 1995 release instead. The title was pushed back to a September/Q3 1995 launch, in addition of being kept being advertised in magazines and demonstrated during the Fun 'n' Games Day event hosted by Atari. French publication CD Consoles reported that the title was now scheduled for an October/November 1995 launch window. However, Scott Le Grand and Douglas "Thunderbird" Engel of 4Play claimed that the game was quietly shelved in favor of their project, BattleSphere, due to being panned by testers during an internal focus group session at Atari. Prior to cancellation, the game was reported to be nearly complete by Jeff Minter in the June 23, 1995 issue of online magazine Silicon Times Report and was rated by the ESRB.

== Release ==
In September 2001, a playable build of Space War 2000 was published by B&C Computervisions as a cartridge-only release. Late Atari consultant and historian Curt Vendel stated in the November 30, 2001 issue of Atari Explorer Online that Bruce Carso of B&C Computervisions sent a copy of a HDD bought from Atari in 1996 during their inventory cleaning process to video game collector Glenn Bruner in order to create a playable ROM image from an early build.

== Reception ==
Prior to cancellation, Games World regarded Space War 2000 as "very impressive". During its showcase at WCES 1995, VideoGames regarded the game to be "a bit weak". GamePro noted its side-by-side split-screen view to be "unusual".
