= Randy Emberlin =

American comic book inker

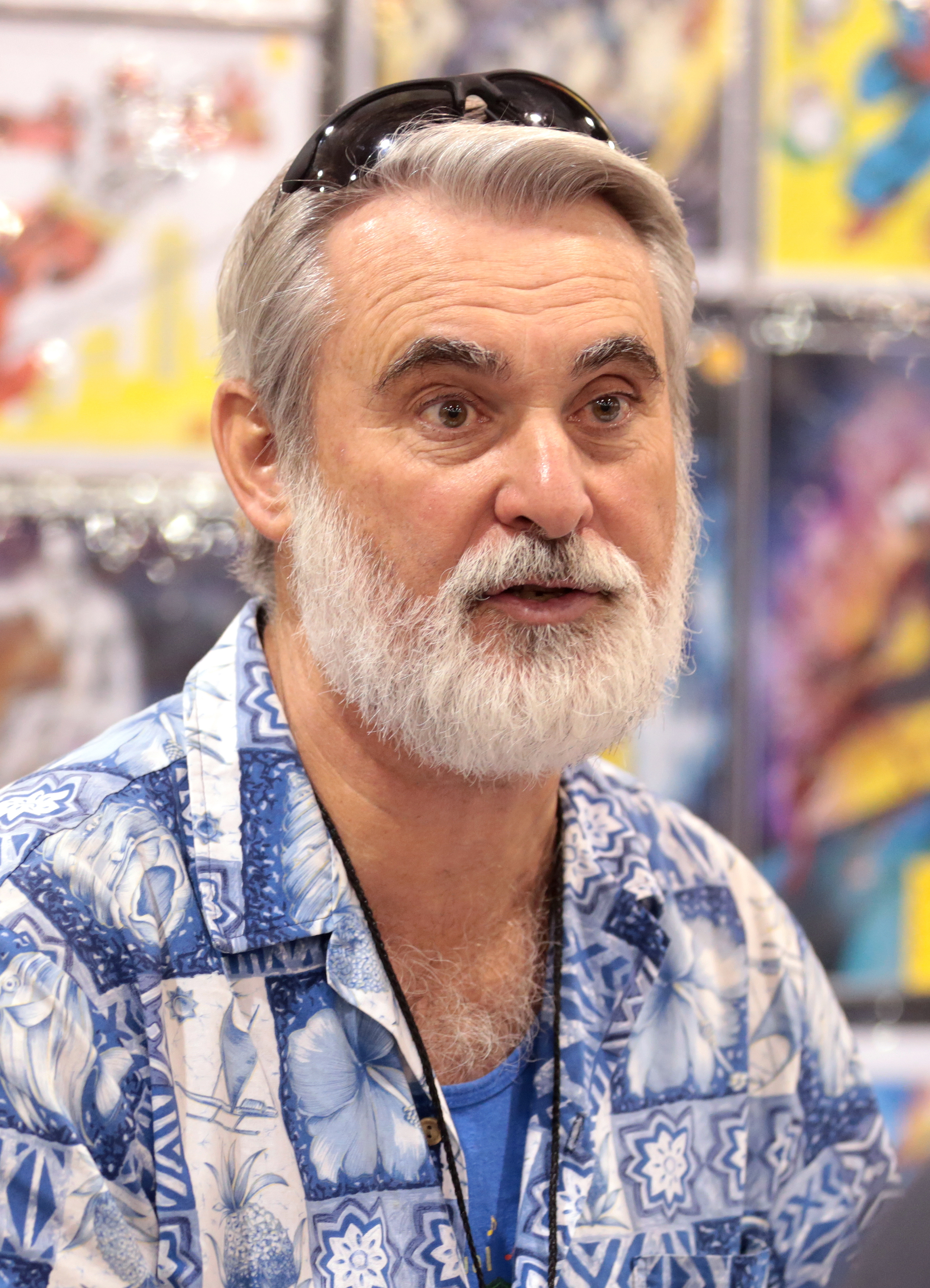
Emberlin at the 2018 Phoenix Comic Fest

Randy Emberlin is a comic book inker best known for his ink work on the Spider-Man comic books. Per the bio on his website, he currently lives in Portland, Oregon. He has spent the past 30 years working in a variety of creative fields, including as an illustrator of educational books and an animator on over fifty television commercials.

Over the last 20 years he is probably best known for his work as an inker in comics, with a résumé that includes long runs on The Amazing Spider-Man, G.I. Joe, Doctor Strange, Alien Legion, Ghost, and recently the Left Behind series for Tyndale House. He has worked with a wide range of pencilers. His cousin is the video game programmer Doug Neubauer; they collaborated over developing the graphics for Neubauer's Solaris (1986).

== Bibliography (selected) ==
=== Marvel Comics ===
- Amazing Spider-Man #339-351, #353-358, #361-375, #377-393, #400, #404, #406, #410 (1990-1996)
- Avengers West Coast #58 (1990)
- New Defenders #150 (1985)
- Doctor Strange (vol. 2) #76-81 (1986-1987)
- Doctor Strange: Sorcerer Supreme #1-3 (1988-1989)
- G.I. Joe: A Real American Hero #65-74, #77, #79, #81-82, #84-109, #111-118, #120-126 (1987-1992)
- Iron Man Annual #11 (1990)
- Marvel Comics Presents #12, #34, #51 (1989-1990)
- Sensational She-Hulk #11 (1990)
- Silver Surfer Annual (vol. 3) #1 (1988), #24 (1989)
- Strange Tales (vol. 2) #1-19 (1987-1988)
- Venom: Along Came A Spider #1-2, #4 (1996)
- Web of Scarlet Spider #1-4 (1995-1996)
- Web of Spider-Man Annual #5 (1989), #117-129 (1994-1995)
- X-Factor #20 (1987)

=== DC Comics ===
- Batman #449 (1990)
- Batman: Legends of the Dark Knight #122 (1999)
- Batman: Shadow of the Bat #90 (1999)
- Who's Who: The Definitive Directory of the DC Universe #22 (1986)

=== Epic Comics ===
- Alien Legion (vol. 1) #8-20 (1985-1987); (vol. 2) #1-2 (1987)

=== Dark Horse Comics ===
- Dark Horse's Ghost (issues 12–16, 18–25, 28–31, 33–36)
