= POKEY =

Atari digital I/O chip

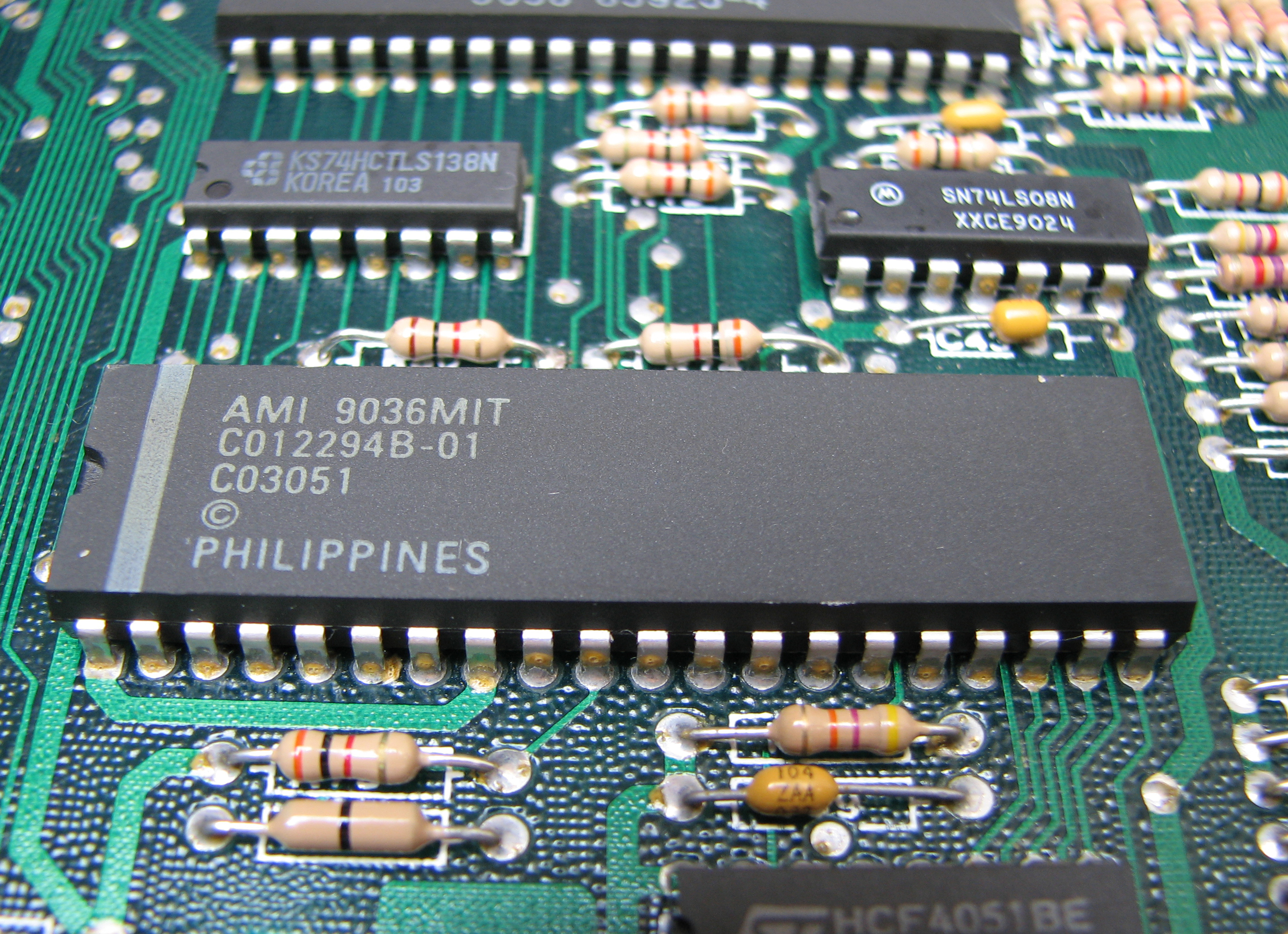
- POKEY in an Atari 130XE
- Component type: input/output
- First produced: 1979

POKEY (Pot Keyboard Integrated Circuit) is a digital I/O chip designed by Doug Neubauer at Atari, Inc. for the Atari 8-bit computers. It was first released with the Atari 400 and Atari 800 in 1979 and is included in all later models and the Atari 5200 console.

POKEY combines functions for reading paddle controllers (potentiometers) and computer keyboards as well as sound generation and a source for pseudorandom numbers. It produces four voices of distinctive square wave audio, either as clear tones or modified with distortion settings. Neubauer also developed the Atari 8-bit killer application Star Raiders which makes use of POKEY features.

POKEY chips are used for audio in many arcade video games of the 1980s including Centipede, Missile Command, Asteroids Deluxe, and Gauntlet. Some of Atari's arcade systems use multi-core versions with 2 or 4 POKEYs in a single package for more audio channels. The Atari 7800 console allows a game cartridge to contain a POKEY, providing better sound than the system's audio chip. Three licensed games make use of this: the ports of Ballblazer, Commando, and Tiger-Heli.

The LSI chip has 40 pins and is identified as C012294. It contains about 5,000 transistors. The USPTO granted U.S. Patent 4,314,236 to Atari on February 2, 1982 for an "Apparatus for producing a plurality of audio sound effects". The inventors listed are Steven T. Mayer and Ronald E. Milner.

== Features ==
- Audio
  - 4 semi-independent audio channels
  - Channels may be configured as one of:
    - Four 8-bit channels
    - Two 16-bit channels
    - One 16-bit channel and two 8-bit channels
  - Per-channel volume, frequency, and waveform (square wave with variable duty cycle or pseudorandom noise)
  - 15 kHz or 64 kHz frequency divider.
  - Two channels may be driven at the CPU clock frequency.
  - High-pass filter
- Keyboard scan (up to 64 keys) + 2 modifier bits (Shift, Control) + Break
- Potentiometer ports (8 independent ports, each with 8-bit resolution)
- High Resolution Timers (audio channels 1, 2, and 4 can be configured to cause timer interrupts when they cross zero)
- Random number generator (8 bits of a 17-bit polynomial counter can be read)
- Serial I/O port
- Eight IRQ interrupts

== Versions ==
By part number:

- C012294 — Used in all Atari 8-bit computers, including the Atari XEGS, and the Atari 5200 console. The suffix on the chip refers to the manufacturer:
  - C012294B-01 — AMI
  - C012294-03 — Signetics
  - C012294-19 — National Semiconductor
  - C012294-22 — OKI Semiconductor
  - C012294-31 — IMP
- 137430-001 — Part number sometimes used in Atari arcade machines for POKEY.
- 137324-1221 — Quad-Core POKEY used in Atari arcade machines Major Havoc, I, Robot, Firefox, and Return of the Jedi.

Atari used several different manufacturers for the chip, however AMI produced most of them in 1983 onward. Early chips were manufactured on a 5 micrometer process, this was later shrunk to 3 micrometers. AMI-produced POKEYs have been reported as having a high failure rate compared with other brands of the chip; the reasons for this are unclear, but speculated to be a fault of the chip packaging or bonding wires. Some limited success in reviving nonfunctional POKEYs by heating them in an oven has been reported. There also exist modern FPGA replacements such as POKEYOne.

== Pinout ==
POKEY (C012294) pin-out

Pin Name	Pin Number(s)	Function	Direction
A0 - A3	36, 35, 34, 33	Address Bus	I
AUDIO	37	Audio Out	O
BCLK	26	Bidirectional Clock	I/O
C̅S̅0̅	30	Chip Select	I
CS1	31	Chip Select	I
D0 - D7	38, 39, 40, 2, 3, 4, 5, 6	Data Bus	I/O
I̅R̅Q̅	29	Interrupt Request	O
K̅0̅ - K̅5̅	23, 22, 21, 20, 19, 18	Keyboard Scan	O
K̅R̅1̅ - K̅R̅2̅	25, 16	Keyboard Scan	I
OCLK	27	Serial Output Clock	O
P0 - P7	14, 15, 12, 13, 10, 11, 8, 9	Pot Scan	I
R/W̅	32	Read/Write Control	I
SID	24	Serial Input Data	I
SOD	28	Serial Output Data	O
V_{DD}	17	5 V Power	I
V_{SS}	1	Ground	I
Φ2	7	Phase 2 Clock	I

== Registers ==
The Atari 8-bit computers map POKEY to the $D2xx_{hex} page and the Atari 5200 console maps it to the $E8xx_{hex} page.

POKEY provides 29 Read/Write registers controlling Sound, Paddle input, keyboard input, serial input/output, and interrupts. Many POKEY register addresses have dual purposes performing different functions as a Read vs a Write register. Therefore, no code should read Hardware registers expecting to retrieve the previously written value.

This problem is solved for some registers by Operating System "Shadow" registers implemented in regular RAM that mirror the values of hardware registers. During the Vertical Blank the Operating System copies the Shadow registers in RAM for Write registers to the corresponding hardware register, and updates Shadow values for Read registers from the hardware accordingly. Therefore, writes to hardware registers which have corresponding shadow registers will be overwritten by the value of the Shadow registers during the next vertical blank.

Reading values directly from hardware at an unknown stage in the display cycle may return inconsistent results (an example: reading potentiometers). Operating System Shadow registers for Read registers would usually be the preferred source of information.

Some Write hardware registers do not have corresponding Shadow registers. They can be safely written by an application without the value being overwritten during the vertical blank. If the application needs to know the last value written to the register then it is the responsibility of the application to implement its own shadow value to remember what it wrote.

Name	Description	Read/Write	Hex Addr	Dec Addr	Shadow Name	Shadow Hex Addr	Shadow Dec Addr
AUDF1	Audio Channel 1 Frequency	Write	$D200	53760			
POT0	Potentiometer (Paddle) 0	Read	$D200	53760	PADDL0	$0270	624
AUDC1	Audio Channel 1 Control	Write	$D201	53761			
POT1	Potentiometer (Paddle) 1	Read	$D201	53761	PADDL1	$0271	625
AUDF2	Audio Channel 2 Frequency	Write	$D202	53762			
POT2	Potentiometer (Paddle) 2	Read	$D202	53762	PADDL2	$0272	626
AUDC2	Audio Channel 2 Control	Write	$D203	53763			
POT3	Potentiometer (Paddle) 3	Read	$D203	53763	PADDL3	$0273	627
AUDF3	Audio Channel 3 Frequency	Write	$D204	53764			
POT4	Potentiometer (Paddle) 4	Read	$D204	53764	PADDL4	$0274	628
AUDC3	Audio Channel 3 Control	Write	$D205	53765			
POT5	Potentiometer (Paddle) 5	Read	$D205	53765	PADDL5	$0275	629
AUDF4	Audio Channel 4 Frequency	Write	$D206	53766			
POT6	Potentiometer (Paddle) 6	Read	$D206	53766	PADDL6	$0276	630
AUDC4	Audio Channel 4 Control	Write	$D207	53767			
POT7	Potentiometer (Paddle) 7	Read	$D207	53767	PADDL7	$0277	631
AUDCTL	Audio Control	Write	$D208	53768			
ALLPOT	Read 8 Line POT Port State	Read	$D208	53768			
STIMER	Start Timers	Write	$D209	53769			
KBCODE	Keyboard Code	Read	$D209	53769	CH	$02FC	764
SKREST	Reset Serial Status (SKSTAT)	Write	$D20A	53770			
RANDOM	Random Number Generator	Read	$D20A	53770			
POTGO	Start POT Scan Sequence	Write	$D20B	53771			
SEROUT	Serial Port Data Output	Write	$D20D	53773			
SERIN	Serial Port Data Input	Read	$D20D	53773			
IRQEN	Interrupt Request Enable	Write	$D20E	53774	POKMSK	$10	16
IRQST	IRQ Status	Read	$D20E	53774			
SKCTL	Serial Port Control	Write	$D20F	53775	SSKCTL	$0232	562
SKSTAT	Serial Port Status	Read	$D20F	53775			

In the individual register listings below the following legend applies:

Bit Value	Description
0	Bit must be 0
1	Bit must be 1
?	Bit may be either 0 or 1, and is used for a purpose.
-	Bit is unused, or should not be expected to be a certain value
label	Refer to a later explanation for the purpose of the bit.

== Audio ==
Pokey contains a programmable sound generator; four audio channels with separate frequency, noise and voice level controls.

Each channel has an 8-bit frequency divider and an 8-bit register to select noise and volume.

- AUDF1 to AUDF4 – frequency register (AUDio Frequency)
- AUDC1 to AUDC4 – volume and noise register (AUDio Control)
- AUDCTL – general register, which controls generators (AUDio ConTroL)

POKEY's sound is distinctive: when the four channels are used independently, there is noticeable detuning of parts of the 12-tone equal temperament scale, due to lack of pitch accuracy. Channels may be paired for higher accuracy; in addition, multiple forms of distortion are available, allowing a thicker sound. The distortion is primarily used in music for bass parts.

=== Audio Channel Frequency ===
The AUDF* registers control the frequency or pitch of the corresponding sound channels. The AUDF* values also control the POKEY hardware timers useful for code that must run in precise intervals more frequent than the vertical blank.

Each AUDF* register is an 8-bit value providing a countdown timer or divisor for the pulses from the POKEY clock. So, smaller values permit more frequent output of pulses from POKEY, and larger values, less frequent. The values $0_{hex}/0_{dec} to $FF_{hex}/255_{dec} are incremented by POKEY to range from $1_{hex}/1_{dec} to $100_{hex}/256_{dec}. The actual audible sound pitch is dependent on the POKEY clock frequency and distortion values chosen. See Audio Channel Control and Audio Control.

==== AUDF1 $D200 Write ====
Audio Channel 1 Frequency

==== AUDF2 $D202 Write ====
Audio Channel 2 Frequency

==== AUDF3 $D204 Write ====
Audio Channel 3 Frequency

==== AUDF4 $D206 Write ====
Audio Channel 4 Frequency

Bit 7	Bit 6	Bit 5	Bit 4	Bit 3	Bit 2	Bit 1	Bit 0
?	?	?	?	?	?	?	?

=== Audio Channel Control ===
The Audio Channel control registers provide volume and distortion control over individual sound channels. Audio may also be generated independently of the POKEY clock by direct volume manipulation of a sound channel which is useful for playing back digital samples.

==== AUDC1 $D201 Write ====
Audio Channel 1 Control

==== AUDC2 $D203 Write ====
Audio Channel 2 Control

==== AUDC3 $D205 Write ====
Audio Channel 3 Control

==== AUDC4 $D207 Write ====
Audio Channel 4 Control

Bit 7	Bit 6	Bit 5	Bit 4	Bit 3	Bit 2	Bit 1	Bit 0
Noise 2	Noise 1	Noise 0	Force Volume	Volume 3	Volume 2	Volume 1	Volume 0

Bit 0-3: Control over volume level, from 0 to F.

Bit 4: Forced volume-only output. When this bit is set the channel ignores the AUDF timer, noise/distortion controls, and high-pass filter. Sound is produced only by setting volume bits 0:3 . This feature was used to create digital audio via pulse-code modulation.

Bit 5-7: Shift register settings for noises/distortion. Bit values described below:

Noise Value	Bits Value	Description
0 0 0	$00	5-bit then 17-bit polynomials
0 0 1	$20	5-bit poly only
0 1 0	$40	5-bit then 4-bit polys
0 1 1	$60	5-bit poly only
1 0 0	$80	17-bit poly only
1 0 1	$A0	no poly (pure tone)
1 1 0	$C0	4-bit poly only
1 1 1	$E0	no poly (pure tone)

Generating random noises is served by reading 8 bits from top of 17-bit shift register. That registers are driven by frequency 1.79 MHz for NTSC or 1.77 MHz for PAL. Its outputs can by used independently by each audio channels' divider rate.

=== AUDCTL $D208 Write ===
Audio Control allows the choice of clock input used for the audio channels, control over the high-pass filter feature, merging two channels together allowing 16-bit frequency accuracy, selecting a high frequency clock for specific channels, and control over the "randomness" of the polynomial input.

Bit 7	Bit 6	Bit 5	Bit 4	Bit 3	Bit 2	Bit 1	Bit 0
17 vs 9 Poly	CH1 1.79	CH3 1.79	CH2 + 1	CH4 + 3	FI1 + 3	FI2 + 4	64 vs 15 kHz

"1" means "on", if not described:

Bit 0
$01: (15 kHz), choice of frequency divider rate "0" - 64 kHz, "1" - 15 kHz
Bit 1
$02: (FI2 + 4), high-pass filter for channel 2 rated by frequency of channel 4
Bit 2
$04: (FI1 + 3), high-pass filter for channel 1 rated by frequency of channel 3
Bit 3
$08: (CH4 + 3), connection of dividers 4+3 to obtain 16-bit accuracy
Bit 4
$10: (CH2 + 1), connection of dividers 2+1 to obtain 16-bit accuracy
Bit 5
$20: (CH3 1.79), set channel 3 frequency "0" is 64 kHz. "1" is 1.79 MHz NTSC or 1.77 MHz PAL
Bit 6
$40: (CH1 1.79), set channel 1 frequency "0" is 64 kHz. "1" is 1.79 MHz NTSC or 1.77 MHz PAL
Bit 7
$80: (POLY 9), switch shift register "0" - 17-bit, "1" – 9-bit

All frequency dividers (AUDF) can be driven at the same time by 64 kHz or 15 kHz rate.

Frequency dividers 1 and 3 can be alternately driven by CPU clock (1.79 MHz NTSC, 1.77 MHz PAL). Frequency dividers 2 and 4 can be alternately driven by output of dividers 1 and 3. In this way, POKEY makes possible connecting of 8-bit channels to create sound with 16-bit accuracy.

Possible channel configurations:

- four 8-bit channels
- two 8-bit channels and one 16-bit channel
- two 16-bit channels

== Potentiometers ==
POKEY has eight analog to digital converter ports most commonly used for potentiometers, also known as Paddle Controllers. The analog inputs are also used for the Touch Tablet controller, and the 12-button, video game Keyboard Controllers. Each input has a drop transistor, which can be set on or off from software. The timers can also be used to support a light pen, by connecting a photodiode to the drop transistor, which captures the timer when the electron beam in the television passes by the pen. The vertical position of the pen had to be read separately.

=== POT0 $D200 Read ===
SHADOW: PADDL0 $0270

Paddle Controller 0 Input

=== POT1 $D201 Read ===
SHADOW: PADDL1 $0271

Paddle Controller 1 Input

=== POT2 $D202 Read ===
SHADOW: PADDL2 $0272

Paddle Controller 2 Input

=== POT3 $D203 Read ===
SHADOW: PADDL3 $0273

Paddle Controller 3 Input

=== POT4 $D204 Read ===
SHADOW: PADDL4 $02704

Paddle Controller 4 Input

=== POT5 $D205 Read ===
SHADOW: PADDL5 $0275

Paddle Controller 5 Input

=== POT6 $D206 Read ===
SHADOW: PADDL6 $0276

Paddle Controller 6 Input

=== POT7 $D207 Read ===
SHADOW: PADDL7 $0277

Paddle Controller 7 Input

Bit 7	Bit 6	Bit 5	Bit 4	Bit 3	Bit 2	Bit 1	Bit 0
?	?	?	?	?	?	?	?

Each input has 8-bit timer, counting time when each TV line is being displayed. This had the added advantage of allowing the value read out to be fed directly into screen coordinates of objects being driven by the paddles. The Atari Paddle values range from 0 to 228, though the maximum possible is 244. The Paddle controller reads 0 when turned to its maximum clockwise position, and returns increasing values as it is turned counter-clockwise ending at its maximum value.

The Paddle reading process begins by writing to POTGO which resets the POT* values to 0, the ALLPOT value to $FF, and discharges the potentiometer read capacitors. The POT* values increment as they are being scanned until reaching the resistance value of the potentiometer. When the Paddle reading is complete the corresponding bit in ALLPOT is reset to 0.

The Paddle scanning process can take the majority of a video frame to complete. The Atari Operating System takes care of Paddle reading automatically. The Paddles are read and paddle scanning initiated during the stage 2 vertical blank. Paddle values are copied to shadow registers. (Note that Paddle triggers are actually joystick direction input read from PIA.)

A faster mode of scanning the Paddles is possible by setting a bit in SKCTL. The reading sequence completes in only a couple scan lines, but the value is less accurate.

=== ALLPOT $D208 Read ===
Potentiometer Scanning Status

Bit 7	Bit 6	Bit 5	Bit 4	Bit 3	Bit 2	Bit 1	Bit 0
Paddle 7	Paddle 6	Paddle 5	Paddle 4	Paddle 3	Paddle 2	Paddle 1	Paddle 0

Each bit corresponds to one potentiometer input (the POT* registers). When paddle scanning is started by writing to POTGO each paddle's bit in ALLPOT is set to 1. When a paddle's scan is complete the corresponding bit in ALLPOT is reset to 0 indicating the value in the associated POT* register is now valid to read.

=== POTGO $D20B Write ===
Start Potentiometer Scan

Bit 7	Bit 6	Bit 5	Bit 4	Bit 3	Bit 2	Bit 1	Bit 0
-	-	-	-	-	-	-	-

Writing to POTGO initiates the potentiometer (Paddle) scanning process. This resets the POT* values to 0, the ALLPOT value to $FF, and discharges the potentiometer read capacitors. As each potentiometer scan completes the bit corresponding to the potentiometer in ALLPOT is cleared indicating the value of the associated POT* register is valid for reading.

== Serial input output port ==
Contains:

- serial input line
- serial output line
- serial clock output line
- two-way serial clock data line
- registers SKREST, SEROUT, SERIN, SKCTL, SKSTAT

POKEY is a sort of UART. Usually one of the doubled audio channels is used as baud rate generator. The standard baud rate is 19.2 kbit/s, the maximum possible baud rate is 127 kbit/s. A byte put into the SEROUT register is automatically sent over the serial bus. The data frame contains 10 bits: 1 start bit, 8 data bits, 1 stop bit. The voltage levels are 0 V (logical 0) and +4 V (logical 1). It is possible to connect the Atari serial port with an RS-232 port by means of a simple voltage converter.

Each input/output operation causes POKEY's internal shift registers to change value, so when programming for POKEY, it is necessary to re-initialise some values after each operation is carried out.

=== SKREST $D20A Write ===
Reset Serial Port Status (SKSTAT).

Bit 7	Bit 6	Bit 5	Bit 4	Bit 3	Bit 2	Bit 1	Bit 0
-	-	-	-	-	-	-	-

A write to this register will reset bits 5 through 7 of SKSTAT which are latches to 1. The latches flag keyboard overrun, Serial data input overrun, and Serial data input frame error.

=== SEROUT $D20D Write ===
Serial port data output byte.

Bit 7	Bit 6	Bit 5	Bit 4	Bit 3	Bit 2	Bit 1	Bit 0
-	-	-	-	-	-	-	-

This is a parallel "holding" register for the eight bit (one byte) value that will be transferred to the serial shift register for output one bit at a time. When the port is ready to accept data for output a Serial Data Out interrupt informs the Operating System that it can write a byte to this output register.

=== SERIN $D20D Read ===
Serial port data input byte.

Bit 7	Bit 6	Bit 5	Bit 4	Bit 3	Bit 2	Bit 1	Bit 0
-	-	-	-	-	-	-	-

Like SEROUT, also a parallel "holding" register. This holds the eight bit (one byte) value assembled by the serial shift register reading the data input one bit at a time. When a full byte is read a Serial Data In interrupt occurs informing the Operating System that it can read the byte from this register.

=== SKCTL $D20F Write ===
Serial Port Control

Bit 7	Bit 6	Bit 5	Bit 4	Bit 3	Bit 2	Bit 1	Bit 0
Serial Break	Serial Mode2	Serial Mode1	Serial Mode0	Serial Two-Tone	Fast Pot Scan	Enable KB Scan	KB debounce

Bit 0: Enable "debounce" scanning which is intended to eliminate noise or jitter from mechanical switches. A value of 1 enables POKEY to use an internal comparison register while scanning keys. A key must be detected in two simultaneous scans before it is identified as pressed, and it must be seen released for two consecutive scans to be considered released. This should be enabled to maintain normal keyboard handling with the Operating System.

Bit 1: Set to 1 to enable keyboard scanning. This should be enabled to maintain normal keyboard handling with the Operating System.

Bit 2: Set to 1 to enable fast, though less accurate Potentiometer scanning. Fast Pot scanning increments the counter on every cycle and returns a usable result within two scan lines. The Operating System uses the slow Pot Scanning which increments the counter once every 114 cycles (scan line) taking a frame (1/60th second) to produce a result. The OS reads the Pot values during its Vertical Blank Interrupt (VBI) and copies the result to the potentiometer Shadow registers in RAM. It then resets POTGO for the next read during the next VBI.

Bit 3: Enable Serial port two-tone mode. When enabled, 1 and 0 bits output to the SIO bus are replaced by tones set by timers 1 and 2. This is ordinarily used for writing analog tones representing digital data to cassette tape.

Bit 4-6: Clock Timing Control for serial port operation. Bit values described below:

Port Control [6:4]	Bits Value	Input Clock	Output Clock	Bidirectional Clock
0 0 0	$00	External	External	Input
0 0 1	$10	Channels 3+4 (async)	External	Input
0 1 0	$20	Channel 4	Channel 4	Output Channel 4
0 1 1	$30	Channel 3+4 (async)	Channel 4 (async)	Input
1 0 0	$40	External	Channel 4	Input
1 0 1	$50	Channel 3+4 (async)	Channel 4 (async)	Input
1 1 0	$60	Channel 4	Channel 2	Output Channel 4
1 1 1	$70	Channel 3+4 (async)	Channel 2	Input

Bit 7: Forces a known 0 output, so that timer 2 can reset timer 1 in two-tone serial output mode.

=== SKSTAT $D20F Read ===
Serial Port Status

Bit 7	Bit 6	Bit 5	Bit 4	Bit 3	Bit 2	Bit 1	Bit 0
Serial in frame error	Serial in overrun	KB overrun	Read Data ready	Shift Key	Last Key Still Pressed	Serial Input Busy	-

=== KBCODE $D209 Read ===
SHADOW: CH $02FC

Keyboard Code

== Eight IRQ interrupts ==
BREAK
Break (BREAK key interrupt)
K
Keyboard (keyboard interrupt)
SIR
if Serial Input Ready (read interrupt from serial rail)
ODN
if Output Data Needed (write interrupt from serial rail)
XD
if eXmitend Data (serial transmission end interrupt)
T1
Timer 1, timer 1 interrupt
T2
Timer 2, timer 2 interrupt
T4
Timer 4, timer 4 interrupt

Interrupts can be set on or off from software by register IRQEN. IRQSTAT register contains interrupts status.

== Keyboard ==
Six key register of actually pushed keys (K0 K5), which contains values from 00 to 3F. Contains 2 control values. One of them acts as decoder of all 6 values. Second control values is used to decode special key values — CTRL, SHIFT and BREAK.
