= Cars Race-O-Rama =

2009 video game

- Developers: Incinerator Studios (PlayStation 2, PlayStation 3, Xbox 360, Wii); Tantalus Media (Nintendo DS, PlayStation Portable)
- Publisher: THQ
- Series: Cars
- Platforms: PlayStation 2; PlayStation 3; Xbox 360; Wii; Nintendo DS; PlayStation Portable
- Release: NA: October 12, 2009; EU: October 30, 2009
- Genre: Racing
- Modes: Single-player, multiplayer

Cars Race-O-Rama is a 2009 racing game published by THQ for the PlayStation 2, PlayStation 3, Xbox 360, Wii, Nintendo DS, and PlayStation Portable. The game is the sequel to Cars Mater-National Championship (2007).

== Plot ==
Taking place after the events of the second game and before the events of the second film, three-time Piston Cup Champion Lightning McQueen and the Doc Hudson Racing Academy are in a race competing against a rival academy. At the end of the race, the members of the other academy crash the Doc Hudson Racing Academy members. Lightning witnesses this and they reveal that they are from Chick Hicks Racing Academy. Chick appears and tells Lightning that he plans to win the Race-O-Rama series to shut down the Doc Hudson Racing Academy, thus bringing more cars to his academy, and take over Radiator Springs, and Lightning will no longer be allowed there. Lightning accepts the challenge, before then immediately calling Chick "Thunder", "'cause thunder always comes after Lightning!" Chick then asks himself about why he always falls for that. Lightning decides to customize himself for the different races.

Meanwhile, in Ornament Valley, in front of the Rustbucket Stadium, Mater meets his old rivals, Bubba, Tater and Tater Jr., who reminded him of when they agreed a long time ago to race in the Rustbucket Stadium for the towing rights to Radiator Springs. Throughout the story, the Taters slowly get along with Mater, eventually becoming friends with him.

Lightning arrives at Santa Carburera with Doc's students and a few of his friends from Radiator Springs. After the first two races, Lightning and Flo line up at the starting line for the third one when Chick shows up and introduces them to Candice. Candice loses the race, despite being promised by her father that she would win, so she calls him and asks him to buy a bunch of new car parts for her, to which he agrees. She drives away to go shopping.

For the next round, Lightning arrives in Autovia with the students and Sarge. Meanwhile, Chick's students go through the MotorCo. building, where they became VINs, robotic cars who speak in a monotone voice. Lightning, Doc's students and the VINs did two races around Autovia. Before the final race, Lightning and Sarge are introduced to El Machismo, an off-road racer. El Machismo loses the races, making him angry, and blames it on Chick and MotorCo., and demands for bigger car parts. Even Chick had to admit that he was not that much of a sore loser.

After that, Lightning gets new modifications again and goes to Motoropolis City for the next round. The races occur at night when the city is full of bright lights. Before the final race, Chick introduces Stinger (the strong silent type) to Lightning and Ramone. Lightning wins this race as well, much to Chick's anger, who was quite sure that Stinger, being a muscle car, would win. He asks Stinger what he had to say for himself, but Stinger says nothing, instead just driving away in anger. There is only one more round left in the Race-O-Rama series and Chick says he still has more surprises.

In Radiator Springs, Mater, Bubba, Tater and Tater Jr. have their final race in the Rustbucket Stadium. Mater wins the race, much to Bubba's anger. On the contrary, Tater and Tater Jr. had fun, saying that making friends with Mater, whose name also rhymes with theirs, makes them feel like winners too. Bubba drives away, vowing his revenge.

Lightning and Chick go back to Radiator Springs Speedway for the final round in the Race-O-Rama series. Lightning has one more race against Candice, El Machismo, Stinger and the VINs before the final race with Chick. Chick decides to use the same modifications Lightning used during the earlier rounds, but Lightning modifies himself again with modifications he was saving for this special occasion. Right before the race, Chick reveals that he was only using Candice, El Machismo, Stinger and the VINs to learn how to beat Lightning.

Lightning wins the race and the Race-O-Rama trophy, which makes Chick angry once again. He claims he could have won if he raced in the Race-O-Rama by himself. Lightning tries to teach Chick that there is more to racing than winning and that the best racers are part of a team, but Chick does not listen and drives away, vowing he'll be back for revenge. Later, Candice, El Machismo and Stinger show up to readily apologize to Lightning for their past behavior. Lightning happily accepts their apology and gladly invites them to come to the Doc Hudson Racing Academy any time.

== Gameplay ==
In Race-O-Rama, players control Lightning McQueen in races set throughout the Cars universe.

Cars Race-O-Rama is a racing adventure game in which the player controls Cars protagonist and three-time Piston Cup champion Lightning McQueen. The game features five nonlinear open worlds, including Radiator Springs. In each area, McQueen can participate in multiple race types, including circuit races, relay, and point-to-point. Some events allow the player to control other characters, such as the forklift Guido in events known as Guido Kart. During these events the player participates in combat racing similar to that found in the Mario Kart series.

Throughout the single-player campaign, players will have the opportunity to visually upgrade McQueen. In his starting configuration, the player can change McQueen's front bumper, hood, side skirts and spoiler. Additionally, his wheels and paint livery can be changed via unlocks from the gameplay world collectables.

== Development ==
Cars Race-O-Rama debuted at E3 2009. The primary version was developed by Incinerator Studios, and this version was released on PlayStation 3, Wii, Xbox 360, and PlayStation 2. It was powered by Rainbow Studios' engine, which had been the technology behind the previous two Cars installments. The PSP and DS versions of the game were created by Tantalus Media in Melbourne and Brisbane, Australia. A toy line for the release was released in early 2009, as the name "Race O Rama" was used for the 3rd series of Mattel Die-Cast Disney Cars. This is the last Disney/Pixar video game published by THQ as well as the last game to be published by any other company except Disney Interactive Studios until 2017 when Cars 3: Driven to Win was published by Warner Bros. Games. It is also the final Cars game to be released on the PlayStation 2.

== Reception ==
Reception

Aggregate score
Aggregator	Score
Metacritic	PS3: 61/100; WII: 58/100; X360: 54/100

Review scores
Publication	Score
Game Informer	6/10
GamesRadar+	2.5/5
GameZone	(WII) 6/10
IGN	5/10

Cars Race-O-Rama received mixed reviews, according to Metacritic.

IGN noted that the game felt like a cash grab, saying that it felt like the "soulless husk of a great movie". Game Informer wrote, "It's not fun to explore, and aside from activating a few boring minigames, there's no reason to cruise around the levels," with regards to exploration. GamesRadar+ said that the game was fun for children and praised its characters and customization while criticizing the price tag, character designs, and lack of iteration.
