= Radar Lock =

1989 video game

- Cover art for Atari 2600 cartridge
- Developer: Atari, Inc.
- Publishers: Atari, Inc.
- Programmer: Doug Neubauer
- Platform: Atari 2600
- Release: 1989
- Genre: Combat flight simulation
- Modes: Single-player, multiplayer

Radar Lock is a 1989 combat flight simulation video game developed and published by Atari, Inc. for the Atari 2600.

== Development ==
The game was announced in 1988, and was programmed by Doug Neubauer. In developing the game Neubauer reused the game-engine from the Atari 2600 game Solaris, which he also worked on.

== Gameplay ==
Radar Lock on Atari 2600

The game is essentially a clone of Sega's After Burner. The player pilots a delta-winged jet fighter armed with missiles and guns that they must periodically refuel and rearm. Two types of missiles may be fired - radar guided missiles that home in on their targets, and "proximity" missiles that destroy everything within the area. Refueling is carried out by lining the aircraft up with a tanker to receive in-air refueling. The enemy aircraft faced by the player increase in number and capabilities as the game progresses, being drones at the beginning, followed by interceptors, then patrolling aircraft that approach from the rear, then bombers with escorts and stealth fighters, and finally "super bombers" firing larger numbers of missiles. To win the game the player must successfully pass through five missions, each of two waves. The game may be played single-player, or in a two-player co-operative mode with one player controlling the aircraft whilst the other controls the weapons. Accessing all the weapons requires use of the second joystick.

== Reception ==
Reviewing the game in the 1989 issue of Atarian magazine, Steve Ryno and Brad Butler gave the game a positive review, describing it as "exciting and addictive".

A December 2003 review for the game on the Video Game Critic website was mixed, praising the graphics but criticising the controls and the high difficulty level of the game. Writing in the 2007 book Classic Home Video Games, 1972-1984 A Complete Reference Guide, Brett Weiss gave the game a positive review, admiring the achievement of presenting such a complex game on a platform having the Atari 2600's limited capabilities. Writing in the 2018 book The A-Z of Atari 2600 Games: Volume 2, Kieren Hawken also gave the game a positive review, praising especially the graphics and gameplay, and giving the game an overall score of 9/10. A 2018 review by Patrick Hickey Jr. for the ReviewFix.com website was positive, describing it as a "unique experience on the 2600" and "ahead of its time".
