= Alien (1982 video game) =

- Developer: Fox Video Games
- Publisher: Fox Video Games
- Designer: Doug Neubauer
- Platform: Atari 2600
- Release: November 1982
- Genre: Maze
- Mode: Single-player

Alien is a 1982 maze video game based on the 1979 film of the same name, published by Fox Video Games for the Atari 2600. The game has the player control a human moving through the hallways of a space ship avoiding the adult alien and destroying the small alien eggs. In some gameplay modes, they can collect a flamethrower to fend off aliens or collect items to make them vulnerable to the player's touch. After clearing a maze of its eggs, the players have a bonus round where they must reach the top of the screen to collect a prize.

Along with Mega Force and M*A*S*H, Alien was programmed by Doug Neubauer and among the many film tie-in video games made for 20th Century Fox's video game division, Fox Video Games. It was one of the first transmedial works in the Alien franchise since the release of the film.

Reviews from The Video Game Update and IGN found the game to be derivative of other earlier games like Pac-Man (1980). Other reviewers commented on the graphics finding that Xenomorphs either resembles venus fly traps or came off as cute. Journalist Robin Sloan summarized that neither Alien (1982) or many of the other video games in the Alien franchise were as influential as the films were for other later video games.

== Gameplay ==
Gameplay footage Alien. This footage shows the gameplay of stomping eggs in the maze, followed by a completion of the bonus round.

The goal of Alien is to move your human character through the hallways of the space ship and crush all the alien eggs which have been placed there by interacting with them. The goal is crush all the eggs, and collect items for points. If an alien interacts with the player, they lose a life. The game ends when the player runs out of lives.

The player must avoid or destroy any adult aliens who also move through the halls. The aliens can be halted briefly in their path by hitting them with a flamethrower, which can only be used once per life. Scattered through the maze are pulsars. When the player interacts with them, the aliens turn blue and become vulnerable to the touch of the human character. Alien uses the difficulty switches on the Atari 2600 console which adjusts the game difficulty. This includes whether the pulsars make the aliens turn blue or not, and changing the movement of the aliens from random to a fixed pattern.

Once all the alien eggs are destroyed, the player enters a bonus round where they have eight seconds to move to the top of the screen and grab the prize shown there. The player does not lose a life if hit in this round.

== Background and development ==
Tony Cohen of Video Games Player magazine said that in 1981, there were nearly no video games release that were based on films. He said that following the financial success of video games based on films like Parker Brothers' Star Wars: The Empire Strikes Back (1982) and General Consumer Electronics's Star Trek: The Motion Picture (1982), there was a rush for video game companies to "snatch up the rights to every hit movie ever made." 20th Century Fox formed Fox Video Games Inc. in April 1982 to produce video games for the Atari Video Computer System. (Note: The Atari VCS became known as the Atari 2600 only after the release of the Atari 5200 in 1982.) Fox Video Games released eight video games between 1982 and 1983 for the system which were film tie-ins. The first film tie-in planned by Fox Video Games, was a video game version of Megaforce (1982). The development and distribution of the game left it to only be re-scheduled for release in 1983.

Frank O'Connel of Fox Video Game described Atari 2600 hardware as being "restrictive" leading to the company to initially rely on the programmers to also act as the game designer. He said that about 80% of all the software Fox Video Games develop was based on licensed properties, and about half of its products being made outside the company. Doug Neubauer worked as an independent contractor making film tie-in games for 20th Century Fox's new game division making games based on films including Alien. Neubauer had hoped that making several video game adaptations would lead to making a film license like Star Wars, finding that "just because a company makes a movie doesn't mean they have the rights to make a video of the movie, case in point, Star Wars. They didn't have the rights to it."

== Release and reception ==
Alien was released for the Atari 2600 in November 1982. Cohen described that that it was part of a wave of film-tie in video games. The first including U.S. Games's Towering Inferno (1982), Tigervision's King Kong (1982) and Atari's E.T. the Extra-Terrestrial (1982) and Raiders of the Lost Ark (1982) along with Fox Video Games' Fantastic Voyage (1982) and Alien. By January 1983, Fox Video Games had released three video games based on films including Mega Force, Fantastic Voyage (1966) and Alien.

Reception

Review scores
Publication	Score
AllGame	3.5/5
Arcade Express	7/10
Retro Gamer	3/5

From contemporary reviews, The Video Game Update did not recommend the game, stating it was a "one more rehash of the eat-the-dot maze" finding the graphics to be "only fair and game play is just too much like other games already available to create much interest." Writing for Arcade Express in 1983, Tracie Forman found the graphics to be cute while Alien gameplay "lacked originality to garner much excitement."

From retrospective reviews, Brett Weiss in his book Classic Home Video Games 1972–1984 referred to the game as a Pac-Man clone, stating that it was "one of the best movie-based games ever released on the Atari 2600" and that while being derivative of Pac-Man (1980) and Freeway (1981), but still "highly playable." Reviewing the game for the AllGame, Weiss added that the other drawback was the cartoonish depiction of the aliens, but that "given the graphical limitations of the system, this weakness is understandable." Dan Whitehead in Retro Gamer magazine complimented that Alien was at least "semi-faithful to the film" and generally fun to play, but that the games graphics were a poor representation of the film, describing the titular aliens as resembling venus flytraps.

In his overview in video games based on Alien, Graeme Mason of Retro Gamer wrote that the game "there is a sincere element of panic and fear as the player is talked through the blue maze" concluding that the game was "commendable, if bland". Similar overviews of the Alien video games series by Takeshi Uechi in Denfaminico Gamer and Luke Reilly in IGN found the 1982 game to just a mild variation of the gameplay in Pac-Man.

== Aftermath ==
Doug Neubauer would also make other titles for Fox Video Games such as Mega Force and M*A*S*H (1983). Fox Video Games closed the year after Alien was released due to event surrounding the video game crash of 1983. Neubauer made some more games for the Atari 2600 towards the late 1980s until leaving the video game industry.

Along with a novelization of the film and the next Alien game, Alien (1984) for Commodore 64 and ZX Spectrum home computers, Neubauer's game was one of the first follow-ups from 20th Century Fox that directly borrow plot elements from the original film in the Alien franchise. Robin Sloan, writing for the Journal of Gaming & Virtual Worlds, said that neither Fox Video Game's Alien nor other Alien video games such as Activision's Aliens: The Computer Game (1986) or Probe Software's Alien 3 (1992) had as strong as influence on video games as the Alien film series. He described that first Alien film as influencing titles like Nintendo's Metroid (1986), while Aliens (1986) use of mobile gun turrets, secondary fire options, and motion trackers could be seen in the various action games that followed the films release.

== See also ==
- List of Atari 2600 games
- List of video games based on films
- List of Alien, Predator, and Alien vs. Predator games
