= Cars Mater-National Championship =

2007 video game

- Developers: Rainbow Studios (Note: Ported to PlayStation 3 and Wii by Incinerator Studios); Tantalus Interactive (Nintendo DS, Game Boy Advance)
- Publisher: THQ
- Series: Cars
- Platforms: PlayStation 2; PlayStation 3; Xbox 360; Microsoft Windows; Nintendo DS; Game Boy Advance; Wii
- Release: October 29, 2007: NA: October 29, 2007; EU: November 16, 2007 (X360); EU: November 23, 2007 (DS, PC, PS2); AU: November 29, 2007; EU: November 30, 2007 (PS3) Game Boy Advance, Wii; NA: November 12, 2007; AU: November 29, 2007 (GBA); AU: January 24, 2008 (Wii); EU: February 8, 2008 (Wii)
- Genre: Racing
- Modes: Single-player, multiplayer

Cars Mater-National Championship, or Cars Mater-National for short, is a 2007 racing game published by THQ for the PlayStation 2, PlayStation 3, Xbox 360, Microsoft Windows, Nintendo DS, Game Boy Advance, and Wii. The game is the sequel to the Cars movie tie-in video game.

The game received mixed to positive reviews from critics. A sequel, Cars Race-O-Rama, was released in 2009.

== Summary ==
Taking place sometime after the events of the previous game, Cars Mater-National Championship is about the first ever Mater-National Tournament, held in Radiator Springs by Piston Cup Champion Lightning McQueen and his best friend Mater. The player controls McQueen as he races against opponents from around the world, all while overseeing the building of his racing headquarters and the ambitious Radiator Springs racing stadium. In addition to returning characters, there are multiple new characters that appear in the game, many of which come from different countries such as Germany, Italy, England, Sweden, and Japan.

Just like the previous game, Mater-National features three hub-worlds: Radiator Springs, Ornament Valley, and Tailfin Pass- all of which have been redesigned, although certain areas are blocked off and can only be accessed in races.

== Reception ==
Reception

Aggregate scores
Aggregator	Score						
Aggregator	DS	GBA	PC	PS2	PS3	Wii	Xbox 360
GameRankings	73%	66%	N/A	70%	64%	79%	62%
Metacritic	69/100	N/A	N/A	67/100	63/100	73/100	58/100

Review scores
Publication	Score						
Publication	DS	GBA	PC	PS2	PS3	Wii	Xbox 360
Eurogamer	N/A	N/A	N/A	N/A	N/A	N/A	5/10
GameZone	6/10	5.1/10	N/A	7/10	4.9/10	7.5/10	5.1/10
IGN	6.8/10	N/A	N/A	N/A	N/A	N/A	N/A
Jeuxvideo.com	6/20	3/20	11/20	11/20	11/20	9/20	11/20
PlayStation Official Magazine – UK	N/A	N/A	N/A	7/10	6/10	N/A	N/A
Official Xbox Magazine (US)	N/A	N/A	N/A	N/A	N/A	N/A	5/10
PALGN	8/10	N/A	N/A	N/A	N/A	N/A	N/A
Pocket Gamer	3.5/5	N/A	N/A	N/A	N/A	N/A	N/A
VideoGamer.com	N/A	N/A	N/A	N/A	8/10	N/A	8/10

Cars Mater-National received "mixed or average reviews" on all platforms according to the review aggregation website Metacritic. IGN called the DS version "cute" and "kid-friendly" but never made into 5th gear.
