= Codename MAT =

1984 video game

- Developer: Derek Brewster
- Publisher: Micromega
- Platforms: ZX Spectrum, Amstrad CPC
- Release: 1984
- Genre: Space combat simulator,
- Mode: Single-player

Codename MAT is a space combat simulator published in 1984 by Micromega for the ZX Spectrum and Amstrad CPC written by Derek Brewster. The game is similar to Atari, Inc.'s Star Raiders from 1979. Both games allow switching between front and aft-facing views and have strategic chart and scan modes. While Star Raiders has the player fighting Zylons, in Codename MAT the enemies are Myons.

A sequel, Codename MAT II, also by Brewster, was published in 1985.

== Plot ==
The solar chart

First-person cockpit view

The Solar System is under threat from Myon invaders. MAT ("Mission: Alien Termination") is a teenager implanted with all the combined tactical skills of the planetary leaders. MAT pilots a prototype spacecraft, the USS Centurion, in an attempt to defend the system from the alien's all-out attack.

== Gameplay ==
The game's action takes place in a realtime 3D representation of MAT's view from the ship. The player has access to forward and rear views, which switch automatically if the tracking computer is active. Threats come in the form of Myon Fighters which engage the player immediately, Cruisers which only engage at short range, and Starbases which also attack immediately but withdraw when their shields are damaged.

The player's ship can suffer damage. If the Centurion's energy is reduced to zero, it is destroyed and the game ends. The ship's instruments, engines and weapons can also be damaged; these can be repaired if the ship docks at a planet.

The strategy element of the game arises through use of the "solar chart" and "sector scan" modes. The Myon progress independently through the Solar System, starting with Pluto and working their way inwards. The sector scan shows a planetary system, displaying the planet, moons, Myon units, defensive units and stargates. The player may travel between sectors in a planetary system using stargates and between planetary systems using stargates, in order to contain the Myon's movement through the system. In "Pilot" mode, the Planetary Defence Fleet are autonomous and controlled by the computer, whereas in "Commander" setting, the player controls the fleet and can direct them to specific locations.

== Development ==
Codename MAT, described as a "mammoth space arcade strategy epic", was developed early in 1984 under the working title of Invasion 2000. Micromega, having never used Brewster's names in the past, were struggling to find a title for it, even calling the game Hank at one point. A running joke in Crash was that the game had been named after being previewed by staff writer Matthew Uffindell. "MAT" actually stands for "Mission: Alien Termination".

Codename MAT was written using Brewster's own polar 3D graphics engine, the code for which is only 200 bytes long.

== Reception ==
CRASH reviewed Codename MAT, rating it at 93% and a "CRASH Smash" award. The reviewers highlighted the fast 3D graphics, damage system (allowing a ship to limp back to a planet for repairs if the engine is stuttering) and balanced combination of strategy and action.

C&VG awarded 8 out of 10, initially finding the control system to be daunting but concluding "...it would probably be the best £5.50 you could spend on your Spectrum".

Both C&VG and Sinclair User compared Codename MAT with Atari's Star Raiders.

== Legacy ==
Codename MAT II, also written by Brewster, was published later in 1985 by Domark for the ZX Spectrum, Commodore 64 and Amstrad CPC. It has a new ship, the Centurion II with two different weapons and a more complex damage system where onboard droids can be assigned repair tasks by the player. The inclusion of ship batteries, directional shields and reactors requires the player to consider energy management in addition to the overall strategy of defending the system from Myon invaders.

Codename MAT II received mixed reviews. CRASH awarded 81%, again highlighting the mix of arcade action and strategy, but criticizing the average graphics and confusing instructions. Sinclair User awarded 3 out of 5, whilst Your Spectrum's average rating was only 6 out of 10, finding that whilst better than the original Codename MAT, it did not compare favourably with Elite or Starion.
