= Super Football =

1989 video game

- Box art
- Developer: Atari Corporation
- Publisher: Atari Corporation
- Programmer: Doug Neubauer
- Platform: Atari 2600
- Release: March 1989
- Genre: Sports
- Modes: Single-player, multiplayer

Super Football is a 1989 American football video game developed and published by Atari Corporation for the Atari 2600. It was released in March 1989 alongside Super Baseball, an updated version of RealSports Baseball; unlike that game, it is not related to RealSports Football, instead being an original game programmed by Doug Neubauer.

== Gameplay ==
Unlike RealSports Football, Super Football is an American football game with a realistic isometric view, replacing that game's top-down perspective. Player one always starts as offense in red jerseys. The opponent starts as defense and are in blue jerseys. The player controls the quarterback to run until he passes the ball before he crosses the line of scrimmage. On defense, the player controls the corner.

== Reception ==
Brad Cook of AllGame praised the game's graphics and gameplay, noting it to be up to par to an Activision game of the era, though he noted the game's sound effects to be poor.
