= The Last Starfighter (soundtrack) =

The score for The Last Starfighter was composed and conducted by Craig Safan and performed by the Hollywood Studio Symphony. In 1984, a soundtrack album was released on LP by CD by Southern Cross Records.

The Southern Cross album includes two songs written for the movie by Safan and Mark Mueller. Two other songs written for the movie ("Satisfy The Night" from Karen Blake and Greg Prestopino and Clif Magness; "Red Eyes") remain unreleased.

== Southern Cross track listing ==
No.	Title	Performer	Length
1.	"Main Title"		2:30
2.	"Outer Space Chase"		2:52
3.	"Into The Starscape"		3:50
4.	"The Planet Of Rylos"		2:04
5.	"Death Blossom; Ultimate Weapon"		3:37
6.	"Incommunicado"	Clif Magness	3:08
7.	"Never Crossed My Mind"	Clif Magness	2:45
8.	"Return To Earth"		3:28
9.	"The Hero's March"		2:16
10.	"Centauri Dies"		3:08
Total length:			29:38

In 1995 Intrada Records issued an expanded redition, with the tracks in chronological order and the complete end credits ("Into The Starscape").

== Intrada 1995 track listing ==
No.	Title	Length
1.	"Main Title"	2:31
2.	"Alex Dreams"	1:44
3.	"Centauri Into Space"	5:59
4.	"Rylos"	2:01
5.	"Centauri Dies"	6:51
6.	"Target Practice"	2:17
7.	"Alex's First Test"	2:51
8.	"Beta's Sacrifice"	6:07
9.	"Death Blossom; Ultimate Weapon"	4:44
10.	"Big Victory March; Alex Returns"	5:44
11.	"Into The Starscape"	7:21
Total length:		48:10

In 2015 Intrada Records issued the complete, remastered edition.

== Intrada 2015 track listing ==
No.	Title	Length
1.	"Main Title"	2:31
2.	"Alex Dreams"	1:44
3.	"Record Breaker"	2:28
4.	"Centauri Into Space"	5:59
5.	"Rylos"	2:01
6.	"Beta Transforms"	0:44
7.	"Gunstars"	0:39
8.	"Victory Or Death"	0:54
9.	"Zur"	2:30
10.	"Krill"	4:25
11.	"Slap"	0:30
12.	"Hit Beast"	0:54
13.	"Centauri Dies"	6:53
14.	"Target Practice"	2:20
15.	"Alex’s First Test"	2:53
16.	"Alex Decides"	2:50
17.	"Beta’s Sacrifice"	3:47
18.	"Good Luck Starfighter"	0:44
19.	"Death Blossom, Ultimate Weapon"	4:46
20.	"Big Victory March"	2:15
21.	"Alex Returns"	3:28
22.	"Into The Starscape"	7:21
Total length:		62:36

== Personnel ==
- Music Composed, Conducted and Produced by: Craig Safan
- Orchestrations by: Alf Clausen, Craig Safan and Joel Rosenbaum
- Electronics Engineer: Rick Riccio
- Orchestra Recording Engineer: Lyle Burbridge
- Music Supervisor: David Franco
- Score Recorded at: Metro-Goldwyn-Mayer
- Music Editors: Dan Johnson and Ken Johnson
