= Incinerator Studios =

American video game developer

- Type: Private
- Industry: Software & programming
- Founded: 2005; 21 years ago
- Defunct: 2017
- Fate: Defunct
- Successor: Playdek
- Headquarters: Carlsbad, California
- Products: Cars; Cars Mater-National Championship; Cars Race-O-Rama; MX vs. ATV: Untamed; SpongeBob SquarePants Featuring Nicktoons: Globs of Doom
- Parent: THQ (2006–2009)
- Website: www.incineratorstudios.com

Incinerator Studios was an American video game developer, based in Carlsbad, California, known for developing several racing games, three based on the animated film franchise Cars and one MX vs. ATV game, with the first three featuring other versions developed by the racing developer Rainbow Studios. Incinerator, like Rainbow, was a wholly owned subsidiary of THQ, but it was spun off as an independent company in March 2009 as part of a cost-cutting move. In 2011, Incinerator launched a new company, Playdek, focused on developing mobile tabletop games.

Their website has been inactive since 2017, and as a result, the company is most likely defunct.

== Games developed ==
- Cars - Wii (2006)
- Cars Mater-National Championship - Wii, PS3 (2007)
- MX vs. ATV Untamed - Wii, PS2 (2007)
- Nicktoons: Globs of Doom - Wii, PS2 (2008)
- Cars Race-O-Rama - Wii, PS3, X360, PS2 (2009)
- Star Raiders - PS3, X360, PC (2011)
