= M*A*S*H (video game) =

1983 video game

- Developer: Doug Neubauer
- Publisher: Fox Video Games
- Designer: Doug Neubauer
- Platforms: Atari 2600, Atari 8-bit, ColecoVision, Intellivision, TI-99/4A, VIC-20
- Release: 1983
- Genre: Action

M*A*S*H is an action game, based on the film, written for the Atari 2600 and published by Fox Video Games in 1983. It was designed and programmed by Doug Neubauer. Ports to the Atari 8-bit computers, VIC-20, TI-99/4A, Intellivision, and ColecoVision followed.

== Gameplay ==
Atari 8-bit screenshot

Players are tasked with controlling a helicopter and army doctors at varying points, with the mobile army surgical hospital (M*A*S*H) team rescuing wounded to take back to the M*A*S*H 4077. The TI-99/4A version is compatible with the speech synthesizer peripheral, and at times characters say phrases aloud, such as "butterfingers."

== Development ==
M*A*S*H began development as part of an initiative by Frank O'Connell and Paul Carter, who collaborated to create the studio Fox Video Games in April 1982. The company pushed "aggressively" to create and market home video games. O'Connell stated that his first major acquisition was getting the rights to make a M*A*S*H video game.

== Release ==
M*A*S*H received heavier promotion than other titles released by Fox Video, and was promoted under Fox's "Games of the Century" banner. Jamie Farr, who portrayed Maxwell Klinger on the M*A*S*H TV series, was the official spokesperson for the video game.

In late 1983, O'Connell announced that the price of the game would be cut by half because of an oversaturated Atari 2600 game market.

== Reception ==
Marc Berman for Electronic Fun with Computers & Games felt the game trivialized the war; they found it "heartless" given how "gruesome" the war was, and that lacking the humanity present in the show and film. Despite this, Berman still found the gameplay "terrific." The reviewer for the Addison-Wesley Book Of Atari Software 1984 found the game boring, agreeing with Berman that the lack of the show's humor and personalities was a problem. An author for Computer And Video Games felt that the visuals and audio were "well simulated," though found that controlling a scalpel using a joystick was less responsive than it was on a keyboard. Lisa Honden for Electronic Games found it decent to play, but said that it was not very "innovative."

== Legacy ==
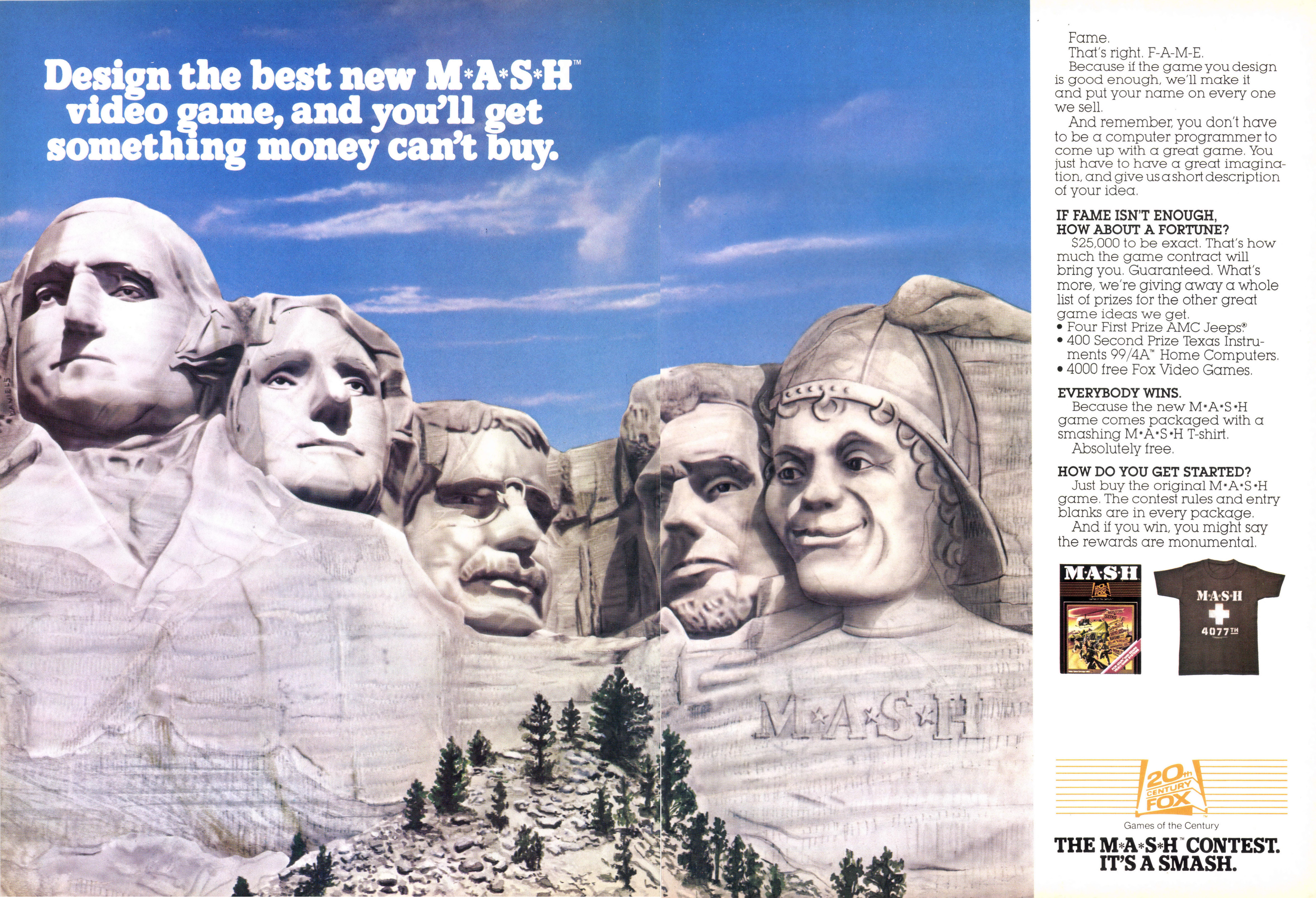
A printed advertisement for the contest

A contest was held, where the person who came up with the best premise for a M*A*S*H 2 would receive US$25,000, with an entry included in copies of the game as well as a M*A*S*H T-shirt. Other prizes for those who did not win the money include AMC Jeeps, TI-99/4A home computers, and video games released by Fox Video Games. A sequel never materialized.
