= Atari Vault =

2016 video game compilation

- Developer: Code Mystics
- Publisher: Atari
- Engine: Unity
- Platforms: Microsoft Windows, OS X, Linux, Atari VCS
- Release: Microsoft Windows: NA: March 24, 2016; Linux: NA: May 26, 2016; macOS: NA: March 16, 2017; Atari VCS: WW: December 11, 2020
- Genre: Various
- Modes: Single-player, multiplayer

Atari Vault is a video game compilation developed by Code Mystics and published by Atari for Microsoft Windows, macOS, and Linux via the Steam client. It contains titles from Atari, Inc. and Atari Corporation published on the Atari 2600 and arcade cabinets, dating from the 1970s, 1980s, and 1990s. The games, where possible, have been updated to include modern-day features such as local and online multiplayer and online leaderboards.

For the launch of the Atari VCS home console, Atari released a version of Atari Vault specifically for that platform, known as Atari VCS Vault. Volume 1 is pre-installed on every unit, while Volume 2 can be purchased from the console's digital storefront.

The game was delisted from Steam on November 9, 2022, to make way for the release of Atari 50: The Anniversary Celebration. Both volumes of Atari VCS Vault are still available for their respective platform.

== Games and updates ==
The games included in the collection include Asteroids, Centipede, Missile Command, Tempest, and Warlords. The collection includes a mix of arcade and Atari 2600 games, including several released in both formats. The list of games also includes a number of titles that had been in development for the Atari 2600 but never were formally released as Atari 2600 but were found and distributed later in other Atari game collections such as the Atari Flashback.

=== Arcade games ===
- Asteroids (1979)
- Asteroids Deluxe (1981)
- Black Widow (1983)
- Centipede (1981)
- Crystal Castles (1983)
- Gravitar (1982)
- Liberator (1982)
- Lunar Lander (1979)
- Major Havoc (1984)
- Millipede (1982)
- Missile Command (1980)
- Night Driver (1976)
- Pong (1972)
- Red Baron (1981)
- Space Duel (1982)
- Sprint 2 (1976)
- Stunt Cycle (1976)
- Super Breakout (1978)
- Tempest (1981)
- Warlords (1981)

=== Atari 2600 games ===
- 3-D Tic-Tac-Toe (1980)
- Adventure (1980)
- Air-Sea Battle (1977)
- Asteroids (1981)
- Backgammon (1979)
- Basic Math (1977)
- Basketball (1978)
- Blackjack (1977)
- Bowling (1979)
- Brain Games (1978)
- Breakout (1978)
- Canyon Bomber (1979)
- Casino (1978)
- Centipede (1983)
- Championship Soccer (Note: Originally released as Pele's Soccer) (1981)
- Checkers (1980)
- Chess (1979)
- Circus Atari (1980)
- Codebreaker (1978)
- Combat (1977)
- Combat 2 (unreleased) (Note: The original game though announced in 1982 was cancelled, but its code had existed and was formally released on the Atari Flashback 2 console in 2005 and other collections since.)
- Concentration (1978)
- Crystal Castles (1983)
- Demons to Diamonds (1982)
- Desert Falcon (1987)
- Dodge 'Em (1980)
- Double Dunk (1989)
- Fatal Run (1990)
- Flag Capture (1978)
- Football (1979)
- Golf (1980)
- Gravitar (1983)
- Hangman (1978)
- Haunted House (1982)
- Home Run (1978)
- Human Cannonball (1979)
- Maze Craze (1980)
- Millipede (1984)
- Miniature Golf (1979)
- Missile Command (1981)
- Off the Wall (1989)
- Outlaw (1978)
- Quadrun (1983)
- Race (1977)
- Radar Lock (1989)
- RealSports Baseball (1982)
- RealSports Basketball (unreleased) (Note: RealSports Basketball was developed but never released for the Atari 2600, though would be included in future Atari collections.)
- RealSports Boxing (1987)
- RealSports Football (1982)
- RealSports Soccer (1983)
- RealSports Tennis (1983)
- RealSports Volleyball (1982)
- Return to Haunted House (2005) (Note: An unofficial sequel to Haunted House first included on the Atari Flashback)
- Save Mary (unreleased) (Note: Save Mary was developed but never released for the Atari 2600, but would be included in Atari collections in the future.)
- Secret Quest (1989)
- Sentinel (1990)
- Sky Diver (1979)
- Slot Machine (1979)
- Slot Racers (1978)
- Space War (1978)
- Sprint Master (1988)
- Star Raiders (1982)
- Star Ship (1977)
- Steeplechase (1981)
- Stellar Track (1981)
- Street Racer (1977)
- Submarine Commander (1982)
- Super Baseball (1988)
- Super Breakout (1981)
- Super Football (1988)
- Surround (1977)
- Sword Quest Earthworld (1982)
- Sword Quest Fireworld (1983)
- Sword Quest Waterworld (1983)
- Tempest (unreleased) (Note: Tempest had been in development for the Atari 2600 but was not released on the system; the unfinished port was discovered much later and completed, and released as part of other Atari game collections from 2013.)
- Video Cube (1983)
- Video Olympics (1977)
- Video Pinball (1981)
- Warlords (1981)
- Yars' Revenge (1982)

Code Mystics handled the port, previously having developed the Atari Greatest Hits series for the Nintendo DS, a similar collection of games updated for a modern system. For Atari Vault, they have worked to ensure that the games in this title would be considered the definitive modern versions, according to developer Matthew Labunka. They spent time to obtain fine details on the look and presentation, such as getting digital imagery of the arcade cabinet art to present alongside the game screen. The updated versions will be running the original games' ROM image, wrapped into an emulator made in the Unity 5 game engine. In addition to original settings that were normally available to arcade players, the player can access options that were limited to the arcade cabinet operator, such as difficulty and length of a single play session. Art and related materials are also available for each game for the player to review.

Where possible, the games have been updated to include both local and online multiplayer, and games use Steam-based score leaderboards. The games have been tuned to use the Steam controller, enabling precise controls for the games, particularly for games that used trackball input devices, like Centipede. Code Mystics worked with Valve to fine-tune controller profiles for various games before release.
