= Atari Greatest Hits =

Video game compilations

Atari Greatest Hits: Volume 1
- North American Nintendo DS box art
- Developer: Code Mystics
- Publisher: Atari, Inc.
- Platforms: Nintendo DS, iOS
- Release: NA: November 2, 2010; EU: February 24, 2011
- Genre: Video game compilation
- Modes: Single-player, multiplayer

Atari Greatest Hits: Volume 2
- Developer: Code Mystics
- Publisher: Atari, Inc.
- Platform: Nintendo DS
- Release: NA: March 8, 2011
- Genre: Video game compilation
- Modes: Single-player, multiplayer

Atari Greatest Hits is a series of video game compilations developed by Code Mystics and published by Atari, Inc. for the Nintendo DS and iOS. Consisting of arcade and Atari 2600 games from Atari, it was released into two volumes released in 2010 and 2011 respectively, while the app was released as a free-to-play model, and allowed for purchase of the extra games. The games include bonus features such as manuals, credits and interviews with Atari founder Nolan Bushnell.

Releases in the series have received positive reviews from IGN and Eurogamer while receiving more negative reviews from Nintendo Power and Nintendo Gamer.

== Content ==
Both of the Nintendo DS releases contain an art gallery of pictures from their playable arcade games, Atari 2600 manuals from their playable arcade games and credits that detail the people who helped make them. Both volumes contain two other extras. While Volume 1 has a trivia game that gives players 20 randomly selected questions about Atari and Army Battlezone, a version of Battlezone commissioned by the US Army for Atari to train the gunners of the Bradley Fighting Vehicle, Volume 2 has eight interviews from Nolan Bushnell, including video and audio and an Atari 400 Basic engine.

Atari's Greatest Hits was released as an app for the iPhone, iPad, and iPod Touch in April 2011. The app was free but only included Missile Command. The rest of the games could be purchased as downloadable content in packs of four, or as the entire collection.

=== List of games ===
The following games are included in Atari Greatest Hits: Volume 1.

Games in the collection
Title	Arcade	2600
3D Tic-Tac-Toe	—N/a	Yes
Adventure	—N/a	Yes
Air-Sea Battle	—N/a	Yes
Asteroids	Yes	Yes
Asteroids	Yes	Yes
Atari Video Cube	—N/a	Yes
Basketball	—N/a	Yes
Battlezone	Yes	Yes
The Bradley Trainer	Yes	—N/a
Bowling	—N/a	Yes
Centipede	Yes	Yes
Championship Soccer (Note: Better known as Pele's Soccer, the game is using its original title in this release)	—N/a	Yes
Dodge 'Em	—N/a	Yes
Flag Capture	—N/a	Yes
Football	—N/a	Yes
Fun with Numbers	—N/a	Yes
Gravitar	—N/a	Yes
Hangman	—N/a	Yes
Haunted House	—N/a	Yes
Home Run	—N/a	Yes
Human Cannonball	—N/a	Yes
Lunar Lander	Yes	—N/a
Math Gran Prix	—N/a	Yes
Miniature Golf	—N/a	Yes
Missile Command	Yes	Yes
Outlaw	—N/a	Yes
Pong	Yes	—N/a
RealSports Baseball	—N/a	Yes
RealSports Boxing	—N/a	Yes
RealSports Football	—N/a	Yes
RealSports Tennis	—N/a	Yes
RealSports Volleyball	—N/a	Yes
Sky Diver	—N/a	Yes
Slot Machine	—N/a	Yes
Slot Racers	—N/a	Yes
Space Duel	Yes	—N/a
Sprint Master	—N/a	Yes
Star Ship	—N/a	Yes
Stellar Track	—N/a	Yes
Submarine Commander	—N/a	Yes
Surround	—N/a	Yes
Swordquest Earthworld	—N/a	Yes
Swordquest Fireworld	—N/a	Yes
Swordquest Waterworld	—N/a	Yes
Tempest	Yes	Yes
Video Checkers	—N/a	Yes

The following games are included in Atari Greatest Hits: Volume 2.

Games in the collection
Title	Arcade	2600	Note
Asteroids Deluxe	Yes	—N/a	
Backgammon	—N/a	Yes	
Black Widow	Yes	—N/a	
BASIC Programming	—N/a	Yes	
Blackjack	—N/a	Yes	3 player support
Brain Games	—N/a	Yes	2 player support
Breakout	—N/a	Yes	2 player support
Canyon Bomber	—N/a	Yes	2 player support
Casino	—N/a	Yes	4 player support
Circus Atari	—N/a	Yes	2 player support
Codebreaker	—N/a	Yes	2 player support
Combat	—N/a	Yes	2 player support
Combat Two	—N/a	Yes	2 player support
A Game of Concentration	—N/a	Yes	2 player support
Crystal Castles	Yes	Yes	
Demons to Diamonds	—N/a	Yes	
Desert Falcon	—N/a	Yes	
Double Dunk	—N/a	Yes	2 player support
Fatal Run	—N/a	Yes	
Golf	—N/a	Yes	
Liberator	Yes	—N/a	
Major Havoc	Yes	—N/a	
Maze Craze	—N/a	Yes	2 player support
Millipede	Yes	Yes	
Night Driver	—N/a	Yes	
Off-the-Wall	—N/a	Yes	
Quadrun	—N/a	Yes	
Radar Lock	—N/a	Yes	
RealSports Basketball	—N/a	Yes	2 player support
RealSports Soccer	—N/a	Yes	2 player support
Red Baron	Yes	—N/a	
Return to Haunted House	—N/a	Yes	
Secret Quest	—N/a	Yes	
Sentinel	—N/a	Yes	
Space War	—N/a	Yes	
Star Raiders	—N/a	Yes	
Steeplechase	—N/a	Yes	
Street Racer	—N/a	Yes	
Super Baseball	—N/a	Yes	2 player support
Super Breakout	Yes	Yes	
Super Football	—N/a	Yes	2 player support
Video Chess	—N/a	Yes	
Video Olympics	—N/a	Yes	4 player support
Video Pinball	—N/a	Yes	
Warlords	Yes	Yes	4 player support
Yars' Revenge	—N/a	Yes	

== Reception ==
=== Volume 1 ===
Writing for IGN, Craig Harris rated Atari Greatest Hits Volume 1 6 out of 10, and said that the 30 dollar price was too high. Harris noticed that the Nintendo DS's small screen can not properly display games with vector graphics, like Gravitar, Lunar Lander, and Asteroids, but he praised the title's "excellent multiplayer support" and "spot-on emulations". Alex Morgen at GamingBits.com gave it 3.5 of 5 stars in a generally positive review. Harris and Morgen both said that many of the included titles would not hold gamers' attention for very long. Nintendo Power rated it 5 out of 10, while Nintendo Gamer gave it 22 out of 100.

=== iOS ===
Eurogamer gave the app a seven out of ten rating, finding it superior to Microsoft's similarly themed Game Room, and while finding many Atari 2600 games to be dated and that it lacked many games made under the Atari Games company.
