= Atari Anthology =

2003 video game compilation

Atari: 80 Classic Games in One!
- North American console box art
- Developer: Digital Eclipse
- Publisher: Atari, Inc.
- Engine: RenderWare
- Platforms: Windows, Xbox, PlayStation 2
- Release: Windows; November 14, 2003; Xbox: NA: November 16, 2004; EU: November 26, 2004; AU: December 3, 2004; PlayStation 2: NA: November 22, 2004; EU: February 18, 2005
- Genre: Various
- Modes: Single-player, multiplayer

Atari: 80 Classic Games in One! is a 2003 video game compilation developed by Digital Eclipse and published by Atari, Inc. for Microsoft Windows; it was also released as Atari Anthology for PlayStation 2 and Xbox. The title is a compilation of 80 video games previously published by Atari, Inc. and Atari Corporation from the 1970s and 1980s, reproducing Atari's games from its arcade and Atari 2600 game console platforms. Many games permit one to play each title at varying speeds, with time limits, or with a shifting color palette.

Extra contents include original arcade artwork and scans of the instruction manuals for the Atari 2600 games, video interviews with Atari co-founder Nolan Bushnell, Windows desktop themes, DirectX 9 runtime, and Adobe Reader 5.1 English version. Support for Stelladaptor 2600 to USB interface, and 24-bit color wallpapers for Asteroids, Centipede, Missile Command, Pong, Super Breakout, and Tempest themes are available as patches. The Xbox version had online multiplayer and leaderboard support through Xbox Live which was shut down on April 15, 2010. Atari Anthology is now playable online using replacement online servers for the Xbox called Insignia.

== Games ==
The following is a list of games included in the releases.

Games in the collection
Title	Arcade	2600	Note
3-D Tic-Tac-Toe	—N/a	Yes	
Adventure	—N/a	Yes	
Air-Sea Battle	—N/a	Yes	
Asteroids	Yes	Yes	
Asteroids Deluxe	Yes	—N/a	
Atari Video Cube	—N/a	Yes	Console version only
Backgammon	—N/a	Yes	Console version only
BASIC Programming	—N/a	Yes	PC version only
Battlezone	Yes	Yes	
Blackjack	—N/a	Yes	
Black Widow	Yes	—N/a	
Bowling	—N/a	Yes	
Breakout	—N/a	Yes	
Canyon Bomber	—N/a	Yes	
Casino	—N/a	Yes	
Centipede	Yes	Yes	
Circus Atari	—N/a	Yes	
Codebreaker	—N/a	Yes	PC version only
Combat	—N/a	Yes	
Crystal Castles	Yes	Yes	
Demons to Diamonds	—N/a	Yes	
Desert Falcon	—N/a	Yes	
Dodge 'Em	—N/a	Yes	
Double Dunk	—N/a	Yes	
Flag Capture	—N/a	Yes	
Football	—N/a	Yes	
Fun With Numbers	—N/a	Yes	
A Game of Concentration	—N/a	Yes	PC version only
Golf	—N/a	Yes	
Gravitar	Yes	Yes	
Hangman	—N/a	Yes	Console version only
Haunted House	—N/a	Yes	
Home Run	—N/a	Yes	
Human Cannonball	—N/a	Yes	
Liberator	Yes	—N/a	
Lunar Lander	Yes	—N/a	
Major Havoc	Yes	—N/a	
Math Gran Prix	—N/a	Yes	
Maze Craze	—N/a	Yes	
Millipede	Yes	Yes	
Miniature Golf	—N/a	Yes	
Missile Command	Yes	Yes	
Night Driver	—N/a	Yes	
Off the Wall	—N/a	Yes	
Outlaw	—N/a	Yes	
Pong	Yes	—N/a	
Quadrun	—N/a	Yes	
Radar Lock	—N/a	Yes	
Red Baron	Yes	—N/a	
RealSports Baseball	—N/a	Yes	
RealSports Football	—N/a	Yes	
RealSports Tennis	—N/a	Yes	
RealSports Volleyball	—N/a	Yes	
Sky Diver	—N/a	Yes	
Slot Machine	—N/a	Yes	
Slot Racers	—N/a	Yes	
Space Duel	Yes	—N/a	
Space War	—N/a	Yes	
Sprintmaster	—N/a	Yes	
Star Raiders	—N/a	Yes	
Star Ship	—N/a	Yes	
Steeplechase	—N/a	Yes	
Stellar Track	—N/a	Yes	
Street Racer	—N/a	Yes	
Submarine Commander	—N/a	Yes	
Super Baseball	—N/a	Yes	
Super Breakout	Yes	Yes	
Super Football	—N/a	Yes	
Surround	—N/a	Yes	
Swordquest: Earthworld	—N/a	Yes	
Swordquest: Fireworld	—N/a	Yes	
Swordquest: Waterworld	—N/a	Yes	
Tempest	Yes	—N/a	
Video Checkers	—N/a	Yes	
Video Chess	—N/a	Yes	
Video Olympics	—N/a	Yes	
Video Pinball	—N/a	Yes	
Warlords	Yes	Yes	
Yars' Revenge	—N/a	Yes	

== Marketing ==
As part of Atari's 40th anniversary, free download of Atari: 80 Classic Games in One! was also available in packs of General Mills boxed cereal products, including Cinnamon Toast Crunch, Lucky Charms, Honey Nut Cheerios, Cheerios and Cocoa Puffs.

A free Atari: 80 Classic Games in One! CD could also be found inside General Mills boxed cereals in Canada.

Atari Anthology includes the following changes:

- The Windows desktop themes, DirectX 9 runtime, and Adobe Reader 5.1 English version have been removed.
- The Atari 2600 titles Atari Video Cube, Backgammon, and Hangman have been added.
- The Atari 2600 titles A Game of Concentration, BASIC Programming, and Codebreaker have been removed.
- Unlockable game challenges, which add challenges by reaching predetermined goals in specific games.

=== Atari Classics Evolved ===
Atari Classics Evolved was published for PlayStation Portable in 2007 and includes 11 arcade classics from Atari Anthology (such as Asteroids and Super Breakout) and also 50 unlockable Atari 2600 titles. Also, every arcade title has an "evolved" version with new graphics and sounds. To unlock the 2600 games, the player must win all awards in all arcade titles.

== Reception ==
Reception

Aggregate score
Aggregator	Score		
Aggregator	PC	PS2	Xbox
Metacritic	70%	66%	68%

Review scores
Publication	Score		
Publication	PC	PS2	Xbox
GameSpot	6.6/10	N/A	6.8/10
IGN	7.2/10	6/10	N/A
Retro Gamer	N/A	N/A	90%
X-Play	3/5	N/A	N/A

The console versions of the game received "mixed or average" reviews, while the PC version received "generally favorable" reviews, according to review aggregator Metacritic.

Mike Davies of Retro Gamer complimented the release, specifically highlighting the 18 arcade games included, including that "some people have complained that the vector games are not emulated 100% accurately, but we can't find fault." Davies described the navigating through the games as a "real pain" finding the interface good-looking but difficult to use.
