= List of Conan sketches =

The following is a list of recurring sketches and characters which debuted on Conan, which aired from November 2010 to June 2021 on TBS. Conan is a talk/variety show starring Conan O'Brien and sidekick Andy Richter. Writers Deon Cole, Brian Stack, Andres du Bouchet, Dan Cronin, and members of The Basic Cable Band (especially Richie "LaBamba" Rosenberg), as well as propmaster Bill Tull, appeared in sketches as well. Some sketches featured celebrity cameos. After the reboot of the show in 2019, most of the skits were retired and the band was no longer present.

== Characters ==
=== Returning characters ===
The classic Late Night with Conan O'Brien characters The Interrupter, The Masturbating Bear and Triumph the Insult Comic Dog have made appearances on Conan. In some cases, due to complaints, the Masturbating Bear is referred to by an alternate name, "The Self-Pleasuring Panda."

=== Punxsutawney Dr. Phil ===
A hybrid of Dr. Phil McGraw and Punxsutawney Phil, this puppet talk show host groundhog first appeared after Groundhog Day in 2014. He appears as a groundhog with a bald head, Dr. Phil-style eyes, and a mustache. At the beginning of the sketches, Punxsutawney Dr. Phil rises up out of grass, and says "Thanks so much!" two or three times. After dispensing nonsensical relationship advice and theories about certain things, such as the mafia being responsible for celebrity relationships ending, Punxsutawney Dr. Phil then accuses Conan, who always criticizes him, of various false issues, such as prostitution, alcoholism, and cocaine addiction, using cut-together voice clips from the actual Dr. Phil show. Conan is stunned by the accusation, strongly denying it, but Andy confirms it, much to his chagrin. Punxsutawney Dr. Phil then promises to help Conan with his anger problems, prompting Conan to ask what will happen if he refuses to take his help. Punxsutawney Dr. Phil responds "Then I will kill you," while brandishing a switchblade knife. Then after going back into the grass, Conan ends the sketch by saying to catch the Punxsutawney Dr. Phil Show weekdays at 4:00. One of Punxsutawney Dr. Phil's appearances on the show was during the real Dr. Phil's guest appearance. Dr. Phil criticized the groundhog's ridiculous advice, which prompted Punxsutawney Dr. Phil to start insulting him. After getting his advice shut down by Dr. Phil once again, Punxsutawney Dr. Phil tried his murder threat with the switchblade, only for Dr. Phil to pull out an even bigger knife. Having not expected that to happen, Punxsutawney Dr. Phil, shaking in fear, said goodbye in true Dr. Phil style ("We'll see you next time!") and then retreated back into his burrow, marking the first (and only) time he was defeated.

=== The Flaming C ===
Conan and Bruce Timm created The Flaming C, a character based on Conan's appearance and jokingly referred to it as DC Comics' next superhero. The character has a comical appearance due to wearing things not associated with superheroes, such as a steaming ovenmit, a jai alai glove, ski goggles, a Star of David patch, socks with garters, fishnet stockings and loafers. Faux videos have been made where the character appears on the show Young Justice. His voice was provided by Bruce Greenwood in the Young Justice videos, partially because the character replaced Greenwood's character Batman in the first of these videos. Conan also played a faux trailer for an animated feature film about the character. The character also had a dedicated segment at the 2011 San Diego Comic-Con. Conan later brought in a lifesize Lego statue of the character made by a viewer. On Conan's Clueless Gamer segment, he played as the Flaming C (as a Superman skin developed especially for the sketch) in Injustice: Gods Among Us. After the 2015 Comic-Con, it was turned into a weekly series on the show.

=== The New York City Heckler ===
A man (Eddie Pepitone) stands up and angrily yells at Conan in response to jokes in the monologue. He always dies of a heart attack at the end of the skit.

=== Basketball Mascots That Should Never Dunk ===
Conan mentions his favorite part of basketball is the dunking mascots at halftime. He then introduces us to some weird mascots who should never compete in a slam dunk contest. As he lists them, a guy dressed as that mascot attempts to dunk the ball, usually resulting in failure. Some of these mascots include: The Solar System, Cop at a urinal, Congressman Anthony Weiner's underpants, and the Human Starfish. As of November 17, 2011, only 3 mascots have completed this feat successfully.

=== Minty, the Candy Cane That Briefly Fell on the Ground ===
Timed for the Christmas season, Minty is a giant candy cane (originally played by Brian McCann, and replaced by Deon Cole after McCann left the show; the lyrics to his theme song changed after Cole replaced McCann.) who walks through the crowd throwing mini candy canes to the audience members as a 1940s crooner-style jingle plays in the background. According to the jingle, he fell on the ground for "just a moment or two", which was enough for him to be covered in "excrement". Actually, his costume is covered in the typical kind of garbage that might be found on a sidewalk, such as dead bugs, hair, a penny and a cigarette butt. One loyal fan created a video game based on the character, which was posted to the show's website.

=== Ted Turner ===
TBS founder Ted Turner, played by Will Forte, appears on a stuffed buffalo named Teddy Jr. to harshly criticize Conan and his audience and claiming the show will ruin the reputation of TBS. Conan eventually brought out his own buffalo and challenged Turner to a duel but the buffaloes instead began mating, with Teddy Jr. being the "receiver".

=== Wikibear ===
Wikibear is a talking teddy bear (voice by Brian Stack) that is meant to answer any question by connecting to Wikipedia via a Bluetooth connection. After correctly doing so, it will then talk about topics that are extremely inappropriate for children, i.e. terminal diseases, famine, natural disasters, cannibalism, mass violence, serial killers, war battles, deadly animals, suicide and murder. Conan always points out these facts, and says a software overhaul should fix the problems, but Wikibear proves that claim to be false by continuing to do so.

Wikibear's incorrect claim that Al Capone died of syphilis was challenged by a viewer on a Fan Corrections segment, who stated he actually died of cardiac arrest. Conan supported Wikibear's statement with fake archived video of Capone's private physician affirming the false cause of death.

=== Old Korean Guy ===
When Conan mentions an actor has been picked for a new superhero role or an athlete has signed with a new team, an elderly Korean man with poor English in the audience tries to tell Conan why he would have been better for the job, usually wearing an outfit to match.

=== Comic Khan ===
At the show's visit to the 2016 San Diego Comic-Con, Conan introduced Comic Khan (Andres du Bouchet), the Star Trek villain, now a stand-up comedian, whose jokes are all insults directed towards Captain Kirk and his own weight gain. He returned in 2017.

=== Leslie the Wahlburgers Warrior ===
Leslie (Andres du Bouchet) is an ostensible fan of the HBO show Game of Thrones who touts the "superiority" of his favorite show, Wahlburgers. He always appears in leather armor and fur, and whenever probed by Conan as to why, he explains, "This is what I wear to sex parties."

== Recurring segments ==
=== Alex Trebek Has Gone Insane ===
Conan shows clips of Jeopardy! host Alex Trebek reading nonsensical clues of which contestants cannot answer, all the while questioning the long-time host's mental state. The clips are actually spliced from several different clues to form one bizarre giant clue. Trebek later appeared in a cameo and did the same to Conan, and left by saying a bizarre statement in person.

=== Andy's news stories ===
Andy previews some fake news stories he's working on for the next week complete with fake previews or stock footage, all of which are ridiculous.

=== Andy Richter's Sports Blast ===
Andy hosts what seems like a traditional sports show, but instead gives off the impression that he has no clue about sports and is very ill-prepared. Examples of this would be when he goes over the week's NFL games and picks the winners based on a real life matchup, (Redskins vs. Cowboys, he picks the Cowboys because he's seen enough western movies to know how it turns out.) and the Clip of the Week in which he shows a clip that has nothing to do with sports. He also lists some recent scores, but excludes not only the teams involved but the specific sports and leagues. He also takes questions from viewers who criticize his ignorance, and answers them with only "Good question, [viewer's name]." Richter is also very repetitive in this sketch, as in this introduction: "Welcome to Andy Richter's Sports Blast. I'm Andy Richter, and this is Sports Blast!" A version aired in 2020 during the coronavirus pandemic which ended or postponed most sports seasons showed him airing pictures of empty stadiums with wildly inaccurate names, as well as referees with funny descriptions like "I'll wait" or "I am a tree", and virtually tossing balls back and forth with Conan (via video chat), one hitting Andy in the face.

=== Audience Craigslist ads ===
Conan shows audience members along with bizarre (fake) Craigslist ads they have posted, in the categories man seeking woman/woman seeking man/missed connections, job offers/seeking work and for sale/wanted to buy. The ads are usually embarrassing or perverted.

=== Bill Tull's Budget Holiday Tips ===
Propmaster Bill Tull gives examples of how to make holiday decorations and gifts out of things found around the house. Tips are always the form of "Take a..., add a..., BOOM!..." Example: "Take a piece of red tape, tape it to a pine cone; BOOM!, Christmas ornament." Between tips, Conan often makes faces of displeasure that more tips are coming, before indicating that another will come.

=== Basic Cable Name That Tune ===
Conan plays Name That Tune with audience members. However, under the pretense that the show can't afford the royalties because they're on basic cable, the band and homeless lounge singer Brian LaFontaine (Brian Stack, whom Conan frequently expresses his contempt for) perform sound-alike versions of songs with alternate lyrics instead, and the contestant must guess the original song. Conan also provides unsubtle hints towards the correct answer.

=== Boomers With Too Much Time On Their Hands ===
Conan mentions that 10,000 baby boomers retire a day, and shows actual YouTube videos of how some who recently have are spending all of their free time now, which involve them doing things much younger people would do, including gymnastics, trying new dance moves, and racing go-carts in the street.

=== Buzzfeed is running out of lists ===
Conan talks about the site BuzzFeed, best known for its unusual lists. Conan claims that the site is running out of ideas for lists and he even tries to prove this thesis by showing bizarre faux lists that are supposedly on BuzzFeed.

=== Celebrity Income Breakdown ===
Conan shows pie charts of how celebrities earn their money, first with real sources then fake ones that insult the subjects.

=== Celebrity Survey ===
In this sketch, Conan has supposedly sent out questionnaires to celebrities and he reads their replies. Conan reads a question and then recites the answer that each of three celebrities gave. The answers of the first two celebrities are ordinary "straight" answers. The third is the gag answer and often relates to something unseemly about the celebrity. For example, to the question: "I like to think of my viewers as people who..." Brian Williams wrote "want to be informed." Meredith Vieira wrote "want to be my friend." Tony Danza wrote "have broken both arms and can't change the channel;" A running joke has the survey frequently including a question which is answered by O.J. Simpson somehow referring to committing murder. To the question: "My favorite time of day is..." Evangeline Lilly wrote: "Dawn." Matt Lauer wrote "Twilight". O. J. Simpson wrote: "Murder O'Clock." A reply where Paris Hilton is the final respondent to a question has been used in every segment for at least the last four years, usually about her promiscuous dating habits. O'Brien and bandleader Max Weinberg have been used as well, with answers that perceive O'Brien as a loser and Max as a pervert. Another running gag has Larry King, Chris Christie and Barack Obama answering, usually poking fun at King's elderly age (even going as far as to him making responses such that he created the universe or something similar), Christie's weight and Obama repeatedly mentioning that he ordered the killing of Osama bin Laden. Actress Lindsay Lohan and her drunken car crashes, Gary Busey's bizarre statements, Nicolas Cage's poor film role choices, and Aerosmith front man Steven Tyler's similarity to a middle aged woman have also been portrayed in the sketch repeatedly.

=== Citizenship test ===
Conan states he believes all Americans should pass the U.S. citizenship test before they are allowed to vote, then takes the test himself. His version begins with serious American history questions like the actual test (which Conan answers thoroughly and correctly), then devolves into popular culture and sexual questions. One example of this is:

Andy: "When is it not appropriate to say the phrase 'That's what she said?"
Conan: "Never."
Andy: "Conan, I'm surprised you're answering these correctly. They're really hard!"
Conan: "Heh-heh! That's what she said

There is a recurring theme among the last two questions in each sketch: the next-to-last question involves Conan giving a detailed explanation of a somewhat-obscure American history topic (i.e. the Teapot Dome scandal), while the last question references a pop culture or sex question asked earlier in the sketch.

=== Clueless Gamer ===
Conan, with little to no gaming experience or interest, tries out new video game releases while bantering back and forth with content producer and avid gamer Aaron Bleyaert and a celebrity guest. Initially launched as a web-only franchise, Clueless Gamer grew to become one of the most popular segments on the regular show. Most of the segments have featured new games on current systems, though one segment had Conan and Aaron playing classic Atari 2600 games, including E.T. the Extra-Terrestrial, widely considered the worst video game of all time. A full series based on Clueless Gamer is currently in development for TBS, with Conan executive producing but not hosting the series.

Game	Air Date	Guests
Michael Phelps: Push The Limit	June 27, 2012	None
Kinect Star Wars	July 11, 2012	None
Minecraft	July 24, 2012	None
Skyrim	August 2, 2012	None
Resident Evil 6	September 13, 2012	None
Just Dance 4	September 26, 2012	Alex Morgan
Hitman: Absolution	November 14, 2012	None
Halo 4	February 6, 2013	None
Tomb Raider	February 25, 2013	None
Injustice: Gods Among Us	June 12, 2013	None
Throwback Edition: Atari 2600 (Combat, Missile Command, Golf, River Raid, Pitfall!, Space Invaders, E.T. the Extra-Terrestrial	August 8, 2013	None
Tom Clancy's Splinter Cell: Blacklist	August 19, 2013	J. Cole
Grand Theft Auto V	September 19, 2013	None
PC Horror Game Edition (Slender: The Eight Pages, Amnesia: The Dark Descent, Outlast)	October 24, 2013	None
WWE 2K14	March 6, 2014	None
AT&T Stadium Edition (Madden NFL 25, Flower, Need for Speed: Rivals, Super Street Fighter II Turbo HD Remix)	April 9, 2014	None
Watch Dogs	May 22, 2014	None
Super Smash Bros. for Wii U	June 13, 2014	None
Conan Visits E3 2014	June 19, 2014	None
Call of Duty: Advanced Warfare	November 3, 2014	None
Assassin's Creed: Unity	November 10, 2014	None
Mortal Kombat X	January 29, 2015	Rob Gronkowski and Marshawn Lynch
The Witcher 3: Wild Hunt	May 5, 2015	None
Halo 5: Guardians	June 15, 2015	Thomas Middleditch, T.J. Miller and Zach Woods
Tony Hawk's Pro Skater 5	September 23, 2015	Tony Hawk and Lil Wayne
Fallout 4	November 10, 2015	None
Doom	February 4, 2016	Von Miller and Josh Norman
Far Cry Primal	February 23, 2016	PewDiePie
UFC 2	March 10, 2016	Conor McGregor
Mario Kart 8	April 28, 2016	Seth Rogen and Zac Efron
Overwatch	May 23, 2016	Peter Dinklage and Lena Headey
Gears of War 4	October 6, 2016	Wiz Khalifa
Final Fantasy XV	November 14, 2016	Elijah Wood
Battlefield 1	December 8, 2016	Terry Crews
For Honor	February 2, 2017	Tom Brady and Dwight Freeney
Wilson’s Heart	April 26, 2017	None
ARMS	June 21, 2017	Will Arnett
Cuphead	July 11, 2017	Kate Upton
Middle-earth: Shadow of War	October 4, 2017	Kumail Nanjiani
Assassin's Creed Origins	October 25, 2017	Aaron Rodgers
God of War	May 2, 2018	Bill Hader
MLB The Show 18	May 22, 2018	Aaron Judge
Dragon Ball Legends	June 13, 2018	Ron Funches
Crash Team Racing Nitro-Fueled	June 10, 2019	Billy Eichner
Biomutant	May 19, 2021	JB Smoove
Deathloop, A Plague Tale: Requiem, PowerWash Simulator	November 18, 2022	None
Starfield	November 10, 2023	None
Death Stranding Director's Cut	November 21, 2024	None
Borderlands 4	September 9, 2025	None

=== Clutch Cargo ===
Conan conducts a satellite interview with a celebrity, in reality a member of the show's staff whose mouth is superimposed over the celebrity's photo (a technique known as Synchro-Vox best known for its use in the cartoon series Clutch Cargo). Celebrities impersonated on Conan include Donald Trump and Arnold Schwarzenegger, who promotes his "smash hit holiday classic" Jingle All the Way as he had frequently done on Late Night.

=== Coffee Table Books That Didn't Sell ===
Conan reviews coffee table books that didn't sell, such as "Movie Stars With Their Eyes Pushed Closer Together" or "Dirty Crop Circles" (the back of which was so dirty it had to be censored). In late January 2016, Conan presented a variation titled "Calendars That Didn't Sell".

=== Comedy for DVRs ===
Conan explains how a lot of his viewers record his show with their DVR, and does a skit which requires viewers to pause and un-pause their DVRs rapidly to watch it properly: a long list of text which scrolls by in a few seconds. So far the list titles have been "New Game of Thrones Characters", and "Nicolas Cage's Next 400 Films".

=== Conan's Peanut Players ===
Conan mentions a recent celebrity or other unusual newsworthy incident, but says there's no actual footage of it. Instead, he shows a reenactment of it using shelled peanuts and toys.

=== Conan's Video Blog ===
Conan announces he is going to share his thoughts via a blog to appeal to his broadening online following by adolescent viewers. The screen then cuts to a simulation of a webcam with Conan in front of a wall in what looks like a typical teenager's room. Conan puts a webcam near his face and speaks in a nervous, monotonous voice. Much of the segment is devoted to Conan saying things that are stereotypically said in teenagers' YouTube videos, such as reviews of movies and TV shows, strange snack ideas he invented and funny photo-shopped pictures he created. All of his segments are introduced using a computer generated voice. Andy sometimes joins Conan as well.

=== Curb Stumpers ===
Similar to Jay Leno's Jaywalking, people on the street (actually the show's writers) are asked several difficult questions which they answer correctly, then are insulted after answering one wrong.

=== Deon Cole Breaks Down the News ===
Conan tells about a controversial topic in the news while Deon Cole rolls by on a small desk asking yes or no questions about it to quell the controversy, and ends with "Well then they should shut the fuck up!".

=== Director's Cuts ===
Conan will show rare, never-before-seen director's cuts of clips from classic Warner Brothers movies or mostly Christmas cartoons, which always end with the main character being murdered.

=== Donald Trump phone calls ===
After the 2016 U.S. presidential election, Conan began airing audio from faux phone calls between incoming President Donald Trump (John Di Domenico) and outgoing President Barack Obama (Ben Campbell), in which Trump asks Obama for advice, or just to chat, shown in a split screen of actual photographs of them on the phone. The calls are meant to make Obama seem intelligent and knowledgeable and Trump to appear immature, foolish and unprepared for the presidency. Some of the calls had his daughter Ivanka Trump screaming like a spoiled teenager in the background or Melania Trump pleading for help.

Later skits had Trump talking to Russian President Vladimir Putin, some of which were interrupted by a naive and over trusting Donald Trump Jr. (who had just accidentally given private, incriminating emails to the pizza delivery man).

=== Facebook photos ===
Conan will pick a member of the audience and take a photo of them with himself using a green screen and props and suggest they make it their Facebook profile picture.

=== Fan Corrections ===
Conan shows videos from viewers who believe they've caught a factual mistake made on the show. However, Conan will claim they don't make mistakes, and so far, they've had "hundreds of challengers, not one winner". Conan will then make up a ridiculous story to explain the error and back it up with fake or doctored footage, or fake experts played by the show's writers, all while berating the accuser. When the sketch is over he challenges viewers to "see if they have what it takes to make chump meat out of the maestro".

=== Fiddlesticks ===
Fiddlesticks is a faux podcast starring the British royal mother/son duo of Queen Elizabeth II and Prince Charles in which they discuss current events and pop culture, then insult each other and their relatives between doing a sponsorship announcement coupled with outrageous promo codes, such as "WHATSAJOB?" for ZipRecruiter.

=== If They Melded ===
In an updated version of the classic Late Night sketch If They Mated, two videos of celebrities are merged, usually the face of one onto another while the second talks (i.e. Nicki Minaj's face and voice on President Obama's head and torso).

=== Local News Round-Up ===
Conan explains that since the show airs during local newscasts, they decided to make one of their own, with stories and items stereotypically found in them (a fire on the bad part of town, a city council meeting, a short weather forecast, the local sports team won, and a lighthearted animal video at the end). Other sketches have featured Andy as an investigative reporter or as a weatherman (reporting on a flurry of snow on LaBamba).

=== Memba This? ===
Andy reveals his new bit, which involves him saying "Memba This?" repeatedly at pictures of fads and personalities in the news from years past. When Conan replies that this is not really a bit, Andy responds with more pictures of personalities, only this time saying "Memba Him?", "Memba Her" and "Memba Them?" Fed up, Conan tries the bit himself, only the pictures he is given are disturbing, causing him to recoil in disgust. Andy makes it better by saying "Memba This" and showing pictures of Conan recoiling at his "Memba This" pictures.

=== Mike Merritt's Inner Thoughts ===
As Conan responds to a news article about race and civil rights, the camera cuts to bassist Mike Merritt making comments, via voice over, about how Conan knows nothing about African Americans and cracks a joke about Conan's race.

The skit was later changed when Conan came out in support of gay marriage, with the thoughts coming from three of the show's gay staffers. They were able to communicate with each other telepathically, and claimed all gay people have the ability to do so but don't tell straight people about it.

=== Movie Casting ===
Conan mentions that a certain actor has been given a certain movie role in a superhero or fantasy movie sequel, an audience member dressed in the character's costume asks if he's sure. When Conan assures them that the part has been cast, the costumed-audience member leaves disappointed. So far, the roles included Gandalf and an African American Bilbo Baggins (The Hobbit), Superman (Man of Steel) and a man dressed as Catwoman (The Dark Knight Rises).

=== New TBS shows ===
Conan explains TBS asked his staff to help develop original shows for the network, and runs of a clip from one. They are often simply parodies of other current shows.

=== Newscasters Agree ===
"Newscasters Agree" (also known or referred to as "Media Reacts") is a segment in which Conan presents to the audience a montage of dozens of local news anchors presenting "their own fresh take" on stories in the news. The stories the anchors present are usually in the scope of human interest or entertainment stories, with the lead headline presented by the anchors in near-precise, word-for-word unison. Some prime examples have included:

"Twinkie Trouble!" in regards to the bankruptcy of Hostess Brands
"Is it time for dogs to have a social network of their own?" about the website matchpuppy.com,
"Mike Myers says 'Yeah, Baby!'" about the actor who played Austin Powers becoming an expectant father
"Don't worry, be happy," a story on how positive attitudes lead to healthy lifestyles (with a few references to the Bobby McFerrin song of the same name).
"Conan O'Brien is about to push the envelope..." about Conan's presiding over a same-sex wedding during a 2011 show in New York City.

=== Next on Conan ===
Like other cable television shows (Mad Men, Game of Thrones) Conan shows clips from their next episode (which are actually from old episodes) that seem melodramatic when played out of context.

=== Oscar moments ===
Conan, Andy and Pierre (poorly) reenact scenes from films nominated for Best Picture at the 83rd Academy Awards. They performed clips from 127 Hours, Black Swan, The Social Network, and Inception. In 2012 movies that were featured were The Artist, War Horse and The Help.

In another set of skits, Conan mentioned that War Horse was nominated for Best Original Score, but he claimed the music doesn't make any sense. He then showed a dramatic scene from it, with the music replaced by an upbeat disco song.

=== Oscar Winner F-Bomb Hall of Fame ===
This list includes all Academy Awards winners who have appeared on the show and say the word "Fuck" during the interview. After the celebrity is inducted, Andy Richter reveals a bust statue that does not resemble the celebrity at all, with Andy claiming the best sculptors were unavailable so they had to make it themselves. So far there are three members of this Hall of Fame:

1. Kevin Spacey
2. Javier Bardem
3. Martin Scorsese

A potential fourth member, Natalie Portman (who was at the time in the running for an Oscar at the 83rd Academy Awards), did say the word "fuck" during her interview. Conan stated during her interview that he would add her to the hall if she won later (which she did), but it did not happen.

=== Puppy Conan ===
As a parody of Animal Planet's Puppy Bowl, Conan brings in a group of Labrador Retriever puppies dressed as himself, Andy, LaBamba and celebrity guests such as Flava Flav and Lady Gaga, all within a miniature replica of the show's main set. Conan promised he would do an entire show with a miniature set with extremely tall guests like Shaquille O'Neal, which he fulfilled a few weeks later.

=== Racial Perspective ===
After Conan mentions a story about something in the news that's controversial because of suspected racism, writer Deon Cole appears and gives a brief commentary, which is usually only a few words. For example, a class action lawsuit by animal rights group People for the Ethical Treatment of Animals against SeaWorld which alleges the theme park treats its whales like African slaves in the United States prior to the American Civil War, to which Cole's comment was "Are you shitting me?!" Deon will often have one of the show's white writers read his commentary instead, to avoid reinforcing the "angry black man" stereotype.

=== Someone is thrown off the studio's roof by security ===
Conan has demonstrated zero tolerance for obnoxious audience members, Andy's antics, and even a mascot for Anthony Weiner's penis. There have been five or more instances where Conan has motioned for security to take away an offending character. They drag the person to the top of the studio's roof and then throw them (actually a mannequin dressed and made to look like them) onto the hard concrete lot below.

During the show's visit to Atlanta in April 2013, a mannequin of Union Army General William Tecumseh Sherman (the victor of the Battle of Atlanta) was thrown off the roof of TBS' headquarters. When he didn't die, they deep fried his head in waffle batter and shot him out of the city from a giant cannon.

When the show was in San Diego for San Diego Comic-Con in 2016, the security guards threw Captain Make America Great Again (a hybrid of Captain America and Donald Trump) out of a top floor window of the Spreckels Theater Building.

=== Things That Have Never Ever Been Said ===
Conan and Andy take turns reading phrases that they claim have never been texted or tweeted ever before in the history of mankind. Examples include "I'm sorry I can't take a lunch break right now, we are totally swamped here at RadioShack."

=== This Is Conan ===
On the show's relaunch episode, Conan and Andy parody the NBC program This is Us. In the parody, Andy plays Conan's wife and they also have three children, Evan, Abbie, and an unnamed baby. Milo Ventimiglia made a cameo as his character on the actual show, Jack Pearson.

=== User agreements ===
Conan will list hidden items of the terms of service for popular mobile apps, Bumble, you agree to send unsolicited dick pics.

=== What Am I Watching? ===
Conan mentions there's too many TV shows on the air to keep up with and how he uses the info button for more details, and then sees fake electronic program guides, which insult the characters or the audience, including guide info for his own show which will insult him.

=== Why China Is Kicking Our Ass ===
Conan points out reasons for why "China is kicking our ass" such as better educated students and lower rates of unemployment. He then shows videos of people doing stupid things to injure themselves on purpose, or celebrities embarrassing themselves on television. Ironically, the Chinese text that appears on screen reads 瓷为什么踢我们的屁股 (Why Porcelain Is Kicking Our Ass) instead of 为什么中国在踢我们的屁股. The mistake was noticed by several viewers who spoke Chinese during a Fan Corrections segment, with Conan claiming they were all wrong, and showed a speech of Mao Se Tung after the Chinese Civil War (with mistranslated subtitles), declaring China's new name as the "People's Republic of Porcelain."

437. Drew Beaumier auditions for American Idol as a Transformers robot.
481. Gary Busey Vs. Meat Loaf on Celebrity Apprentice.
742. A man attempts to break a bottle on his friend's head, but it doesn't shatter and instead nearly knocks him out.
756. A man falls face-first from a set of bleachers onto a folding chair and hits his head.
757. A pickup truck attempts to go up a ramp and over a man holding a large ball but fails and runs the man over.
762. A man jumps off a roof, lands on a metal fence, and injures his testicles.
765. A man sings and whistles a cheesy original song while his friends dance poorly behind him.
777. A drunken man falls off the back of a slow moving car.
781. A man holds several fire crackers in his mouth, lights them and burns his lips.
781. A man kicks a soccer ball into his friend's crotch.
831. Sam B's performance on America's Got Talent.
921. A video of a guy who strapped a leaf blower to himself and spins around on an office chair.
921. A woman twerks in the seat of a moving car and falls out of the open door.

=== Why Would You Tweet That? ===
Conan reads some funny (fake) celebrity tweets that make fun of the celebrities.

=== TV Movie Casting ===
A fictitious new made-for-TV movie is announced, based on a real-life event Conan has mentioned. Conan then says he has the inside scoop on the movie's casting. Viewers are shown two photos side-by-side of a person or thing who will be portrayed in the movie and the person that will be playing the role. The casting first starts off with people who strikingly resemble the person they are playing but then goes off to extremes with, usually, objects or fictitious characters bearing some resemblance to the person they are playing.

=== The Audiencey Awards ===
Conan awards members of the studio audience for various talents. Typically this will always include "best celebrity impression" to highlight lookalikes (as in movie casting), and then a variety of other awards which are achieved with props and superimposed images. For example, the winner of "Best Foreign Language Audience Member" was shown with a large superimposed mustache and sombrero, and the "Audience Member Who Smells the Most Like Fresh Salmon" was attacked by a man in a bear costume. Awards show intermission segments (a fashion critic, red carpet interviews, how the award is built, etc.) are also parodied.

== Celebrity cameos ==
Sometimes on the show, celebrities make brief surprise cameos in skits.

=== Chris Parnell explains a joke ===
Conan mentions that the number of biracial babies is on the rise in the United States. Conan then brings out Deon Cole to comment, and all he said was "You're welcome America." Conan then said he didn't understand the joke. Chris Parnell then appeared and explained that Deon is so irresistible to fertile young women and his sperm is so potent, he's fathered thousands of biracial children.

He later returned to explain how Deon is able to take undistorted pictures of his enormous penis with the iPhone 5's panoramic camera. He also explained that Deon's claim reinforces the stereotype that all black men have larger than average sized penises.

=== Jon Cryer is a troll ===
In response to Two and a Half Men co-star Charlie Sheen's comment that he was a troll, Cryer appeared in a cameo and confessed that he was indeed born a troll doll, and that other celebrities such as Helen Mirren were also once trolls.

=== Larry King's new show ===
Conan announced that Larry King is hosting a new show in the rafters of his own studio. King appeared in a cameo and began taking calls from viewers, similar to the format of Larry King Live. Andy Richter was always the show's celebrity guest.

=== Theme song lyrics ===
Conan mentions his theme song now has lyrics and "Weird Al" Yankovic appeared and performed it. The first half was normal, describing the show in general, but then turned dark, describing the time Yankovic and Conan went camping and Conan killed someone and swore Al to secrecy (which he had just broke by announcing it on national television, and feared Conan would kill him too).

=== Nick Offerman from Parks and Recreation Reads Tweets from Young Female Celebrities ===
Actor and woodworking enthusiast Nick Offerman reads actual tweets from young (18–30 years old) female celebrities, such as Miley Cyrus, Selena Gomez and Miranda Cosgrove, while building furniture. They are often short and nonsensical, but read in a serious manner.

=== Super Dave's lawsuit ===
Super Dave Osborne appeared and explained he sued a plastic surgeon for a botched lip enhancement procedure. He explained the judge would award him $10,000,000 if he would go on a talk show, tell three dirty jokes, and prove the people weren't laughing at them, but at his ridiculous lips. After doing so, Conan claims he won the case.

=== Conan and a fan meet Simon Baker ===
Conan mentions The Mentalist is shot on the same lot as his show, and offers a fan of it accompany him to meet its star Simon Baker. After finding him reading a magazine behind the show's studio, Baker ran off as fast as he could.

=== Jersey Shore Audition Tapes ===
Conan mentioned Jersey Shore is looking for new male cast members. He then showed audition tapes featuring Jack McBrayer, DJ Qualls, Jesse Eisenberg, and John Lithgow. Actual Jersey Shore cast member Mike Sorrentino also briefly appeared, however the casting director quickly yelled "NEXT!"

=== The Return of Max Weinberg ===
On October 28, 2014, Conan noticed that their house band's drummer James Wormworth had wandered off and fallen into an abandoned mine shaft. Conan then asked if anyone in the audience can play the drums, and Max Weinberg, leader of the band of the show's original incarnation, Late Night, answered and ran onstage to drum for the remainder of the episode.

=== The Hollywood Buzz ===
Starting in late April 2020, Conan began checking in with Access Hollywood host Mario Lopez for the latest entertainment news, with Lopez always saying absolutely nothing is happening because of the near shutdown of film and television production caused by social distancing restrictions due to the COVID-19 pandemic.

== Running gags ==
- Conan often likes to compare Thursday's audiences with Wednesday's, usually claiming one was horrible while the other is great (shows for both days are filmed with the same audience on Wednesdays).
- A long running gag is that Conan is a cruel and oppressive boss, and his employees (especially Andy) secretly harbor animosity towards him.
- Another running gag is that Conan and Andy are secretly gay lovers (despite being married to women).
- Contrary to reality, Conan often mentions TBS doesn't have the money for expensive writers, sets, props, skits, licensing fees, etc., equating it with a low-budget local public access cable channel.
- When a website address is displayed, instead of showing a "/", a picture of guitarist Slash is shown.
- Sometimes when Conan makes an Anti-American remark (such as its obesity problem, recession, obsession with celebrities, reality shows, social networking, etc.), he'll make the crowd do the "USA chant".
- For a brief period, when a man sitting in the front row wore a hat, Conan would try it on after being introduced at the beginning of the show.
- Conan formerly offered front row audience members to touch his nipples at the start of the show. Conan later showed a commercial for a fake lawyer who represents people who Conan has traumatized from doing so.
- The show has recently began playing parodies of the "St. Elmo's Fire theme song" after Conan's monologue jokes while a leaf blower runs in his face, which Andy finds ridiculous since they give undeserved praise to the low quality punchlines.
