= RealSports =

Series of Atari video games

- Genre(s): Sports
- Developer(s): Atari, Inc.
- Publisher(s): Atari, Inc.
- Platform(s): Atari 2600, Atari 5200, Atari 7800, Atari 8-bit
- First release: RealSports Baseball (2600); October 1982
- Latest release: RealSports Baseball (7800); March 1989

RealSports is a series of sports video games originally developed and published Atari, Inc. The first games were released in 1982 for the Atari 2600, then the series expanded to the Atari 5200, Atari 7800, and Atari 8-bit computers. By the early 1980s, Atari's initial sports releases for the VCS — Home Run and Football — were dated in terms of visuals and gameplay, and targeted by an Intellivision ad campaign from Mattel. The RealSports series was an attempt by Atari to revitalize the sports game lineup for their consoles.

== Development ==
Atari's development of the RealSports series was prompted by an aggressive Intellivision 1980 advertising campaign fronted by George Plimpton criticising the graphics and gameplay of Atari's sports games for the Atari 2600. The advertisements negatively compared Atari's sports games to Mattel's Sports Network series of games, the world's first sports video games franchise.

The first three games in the series were RealSports Baseball (October 1982), RealSports Football (December 1982), and RealSports Volleyball (November 1982). The baseball and football offerings were essentially upgrades on existing games for the 2600, whilst the volleyball game was to be the first volleyball-theme game released for an Atari platform. RealSports Soccer and RealSports Tennis followed before the 1983 video game crash halted development of further RealSports games whilst Atari remained under the management of Warner Brothers.

Following Atari's sale to Jack Tramiel in 1984, two further RealSports games were released. RealSports Boxing was released in 1987, whilst a further update of RealSports Baseball for the Atari 7800 platform was released in 1988 as the final RealSports game. A basketball game, RealSports Basketball, was announced but never officially released for the original Atari platforms, though it was later included on AtGames Flashback consoles.

== List of games ==
RealSports games
Year	Title	Platforms
1982	RealSports Baseball	2600, 5200, 7800, 8-bit (unreleased)
1982	RealSports Football	2600, 5200, 8-bit
1982	RealSports Volleyball	2600
1983	RealSports Soccer	2600, 5200, 8-bit (unreleased)
1983	RealSports Tennis	2600, 5200, 8-bit
1987	RealSports Boxing	2600
Unreleased	RealSports Basketball	2600, 5200, 8-bit

== Reception ==
The 1984 Software Encyclopedia called the RealSports series an effective update to Atari's sports game offerings. In 2018, the British magazine Retro Gamer assessed the RealSports franchise positively compared to Mattel's Sports Network series for the Intellivision in a head-to-head comparison.

== Legacy ==
The intellectual property rights for the game series passed to Hasbro Interactive and were subsequently bought by Infogrames in 2001, which was subsequently re-named Atari SA. Games from the series were re-released by Infogrames on the 2005 Atari Anthology. Games from the series were then subsequently re-released for the Atari Flashback 3 in 2011, which was the first console of the Flashback series made by the AtGames company. As of 2021, games from the series have been included on all subsequent Flashback consoles, including the Flashback 4, 5, 6, 7, 8, 9, and X. A re-release for the Atari VCS 2600 containing all seven games on one cartridge was released in winter 2024.
