= Adventure (1980 video game) =

1980 video game

- Box art by Susan Jaekel
- Developer: Atari, Inc.
- Publishers: Atari, Inc.
- Designer: Warren Robinett
- Programmer: Warren Robinett
- Platform: Atari 2600
- Release: March 1980
- Genre: Action-adventure
- Mode: Single-player

Adventure is a 1980 action-adventure game developed and published by Atari, Inc. for the Atari 2600. (Note: The console was called the Atari Video Computer System (Atari VCS) from its launch in 1977 until it was rebranded as the Atari 2600 in November 1982.) The player controls a square avatar whose quest is to explore an open-ended environment to find a magical chalice and return it to the Golden Castle. The game world is populated by roaming enemies: three dragons that can eat the avatar and a bat that randomly steals and moves items around the game world. Adventure introduced new elements to console games, including enemies that continue to move when offscreen.

The game was conceived by Warren Robinett as a graphical version of the 1977 text adventure Colossal Cave Adventure. Robinett spent approximately a year designing and coding the game while overcoming a variety of technical limitations of the console's hardware, as well as difficulties with Atari management. As a result of conflicts with Atari's management which denied giving public credit for programmers, Robinett programmed a secret room within the game that contained his name; this room was only found by players after the game was shipped and Robinett had left Atari. While not the first such Easter egg, Robinett's secret room pioneered this idea within video games and other forms of media, and it since has become a part of popular culture, such as in the climax of Ernest Cline's 2011 novel Ready Player One and its 2018 film adaptation.

Adventure received positive reviews at the time of its release. It is one of the first action-adventure and fantasy games, and inspired many other games in the genre. More than a million copies of Adventure were sold, making it one of the best-selling Atari 2600 games. It has been included in numerous Atari game collections for modern computer hardware. The game's prototype code was used as the basis for the 1979 Superman game, and a planned sequel eventually formed the basis for the Swordquest games.

== Gameplay ==
The player with the White Key in the White Castle's catacombs, pursued by the green dragon, Grundle

In Adventure, the player's goal is to recover the Enchanted Chalice, which an evil magician has stolen and hidden in the kingdom, and return it to the Golden Castle. The kingdom is made of a total of 30 rooms, with various obstacles, enemies, and mazes located in and around the Golden, White, and Black Castles. The kingdom is guarded by three dragons—the yellow Yorgle, the green Grundle, and the red Rhindle—that protect or flee from various items and attack the player's avatar. A hostile bat can roam the kingdom freely, carrying an item or a dragon around; the bat was to be named "Knubberrub" but the name is not in the manual. The bat's two states are agitation and non-agitation. When in the agitated state, the bat will either pick up or swap what it currently carries with an object in the present room, eventually returning to the non-agitated state where it will not pick up an object. The bat continues to fly around, swapping objects, even offscreen.

The player's avatar is a square that can move within and between rooms; each room is represented by a single screen. Helpful objects include keys that open the castles, a magnet that pulls items towards the player, a magic bridge that the player can use to cross certain obstacles, and a sword which can be used to defeat the dragons. The player may only carry one object at a time. If eaten by a dragon, the player can then opt to resurrect the dead avatar instead of completely restarting the game. The avatar reappears at the Golden Castle and all objects remain at their latest location, but all slain dragons are resurrected. The ability to resurrect the avatar without resetting the entire game is one of the earliest examples of a "continue game" option in video games.

The game offers three different skill levels. Level 1 is the easiest, as it uses a simplified room layout and does not include the White Castle, bat, red dragon, or invisible mazes. Level 2 is the full version of the game, with the various objects appearing in set positions at the start. Level 3 is similar to Level 2, but the location of the objects is randomized for a greater challenge. The player can use the difficulty switches on the Atari 2600 to further control the game's difficulty; one switch controls the dragons' bite speed, and one causes them to flee when the player carries the sword.

== Development ==
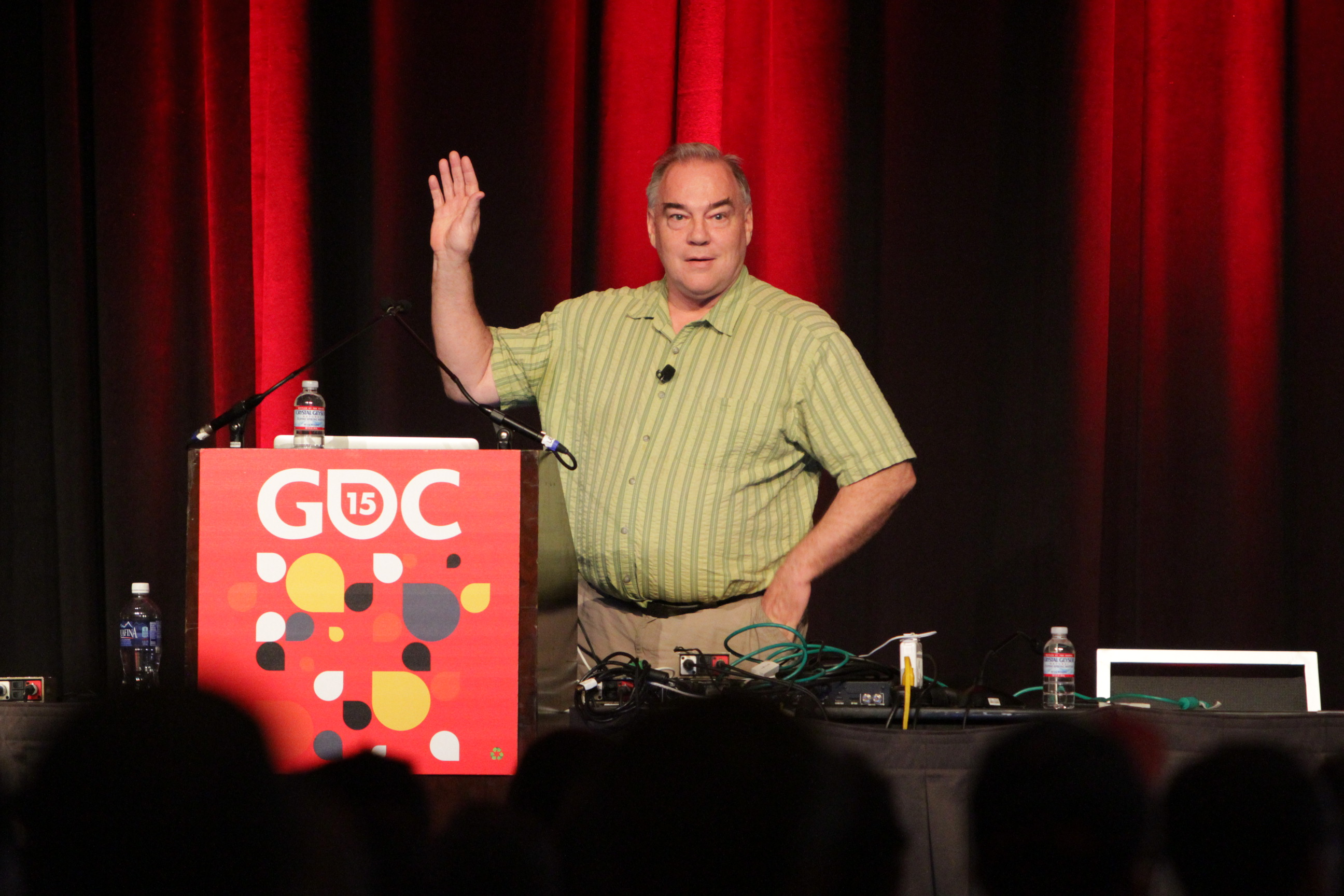
Warren Robinett presenting a postmortem of Adventure's development at GDC 2015

Adventure was designed and programmed by Atari employee Warren Robinett and published by Atari, Inc. At the time, Atari programmers were generally given full control on the creative direction and development cycle for their games; to stay productive, this required them to begin planning their next game as they neared completion of their current one. Robinett was finishing his work on Slot Racers when he was given an opportunity to visit the Stanford Artificial Intelligence Laboratory by Julius Smith, one of several friends he was sharing a house with. There, he was introduced to the 1977 version of the computer text game Colossal Cave Adventure, created by Will Crowther and modified by Don Woods. After playing the game for several hours, he was inspired to create a graphical version.

Robinett began designing his graphics-based game with the help of a Hewlett-Packard 1611A logic analyzer (a debugging tool) around May to June 1978. He was soon aware that memory use was critical because Atari 2600 cartridge ROMs had only 4096 bytes (4 KB), and the system had 128 bytes of RAM for program variables. In contrast, Colossal Cave Adventure used hundreds of kilobytes of memory on a large computer. The final game used nearly all of the available memory (including 5% of the cartridge storage for Robinett's Easter egg), with 15 unused bytes from the ROM capacity. Robinett credits Ken Thompson, his professor at University of California, Berkeley, with teaching him the skills needed to use the limited memory efficiently. Thompson had required his students to learn the C programming language that he had invented at AT&T, and Robinett carried C techniques into assembly language.

Robinett first identified ways to translate the elements of Colossal Cave Adventure into simple, easily recognizable graphics that the player interacted with directly, replacing text-based commands with joystick controls. Due to the system's low-resolution pixels, Robinett noted the dragons look more like ducks. Robinett developed workarounds for various technical limitations of the Atari 2600, which has only one playfield and five memory-mapped registers available to represent moving objects. Only two of these registers are capable of representing more complex sprites, so he used those for objects and creatures within the game. He used the register originally designated for the ball in games such as Pong to represent the player's avatar. Finally, he used the registers assigned for missiles, such as the bullets in Combat, for additional walls in the playing field, so as to represent different rooms within the game using the same playfield. Another hardware limitation forces the left and right sides of nearly every screen to be mirrored, which fostered the creation of the game's confusing mazes. The exceptions include two screens in the Black Castle catacombs and two in the main hallway beneath the Golden Castle. They are mirrored, but they contain a vertical wall object in the room to make an asymmetrical screen as well as a secret door for an Easter egg. Robinett originally intended for all rooms to be bidirectionally connected, but programming bugs make a few such connections unidirectional, which are explained away as "bad magic" in the game's manual.

Robinett overcame these limitations to introduce concepts novel to video games. He constructed thirty different rooms, whereas most games of the time presented only a single screen. Furthermore, off-screen objects such as the bat continued to move according to their programming behavior.

In addition to the technical limitations, Robinett had struggled with Atari's management over the game. Around the time of Adventure's development, Atari, then owned by Warner Communications, had hired Ray Kassar as general manager of their Consumer Division, and he was later promoted to president and CEO of Atari in December 1978. Kassar interacted with the programmers rarely and generally treated their contributions with indifference. Robinett was initially discouraged from working on Adventure by his supervisor, George Simcock, who said the ambitious game could not be done on Atari 2600 based on knowing how much memory Colossal Cave Adventure uses. When Robinett developed a working prototype within one month, Atari's management team was impressed, encouraging him to continue the game. The management later tried to convince Robinett to make it a tie-in work for the upcoming film Superman (1978), which was owned by Warner Communication, but Robinett remained committed to his initial idea. Instead, Atari developer John Dunn agreed to take Robinett's prototype source code to make the 1979 Superman game.

A second prototype was completed near the end of 1978, with only about eight rooms, a single dragon, and two objects. Robinett recognized that it demonstrated his design goals but was boring. He put the game aside for a few months and came back with additional ideas, finishing it by June 1979. Three of these changes were the dragon being able to eat the avatar, the ability to "resurrect" the avatar, and the addition of the sword object with which to kill the dragon. Robinett found that the possibilities that arose from this combination of elements improved the excitement of the game, and he subsequently made three dragons, reusing the same source code for the behavior of all three. The magnet was created to work around a potential situation where the player could irretrievably drop an object into a wall space.

To develop the game's plot, Robinett worked with Steve Harding, the author for nearly all Atari 2600 game manuals at that time. Harding developed most of the plot after playing the game, with Robinett revising elements where he saw fit. Robinett invented names for all three dragons and used a friend's suggestion for naming the bat "Knubberrub", although the bat's name never made it into the game's official documentation.

Robinett submitted the source code for Adventure to Atari management in June 1979 and soon left Atari. Atari released the game in March 1980.

== Easter egg ==
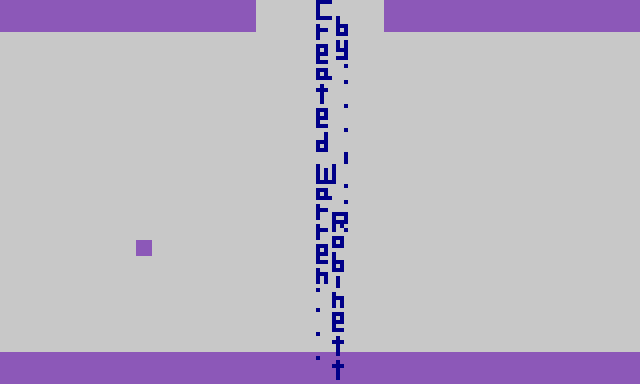
The Adventure Easter egg: "Created by Warren Robinett"

Generally defined as a "message, trick, or unusual behavior hidden inside a computer program by its creator", the Easter egg concept was popularized by Adventure, influenced by the corporate culture at Atari. After Atari's acquisition by Warner Communications in 1976, there was a culture clash between the executives from New York and the Californian programmers who were more laid back. Atari removed the names of game developers from their products as a means to prevent competitors from identifying and recruiting Atari's programmers. This also was used as a means to deny the developers a bargaining chip in any negotiations they had with management. These attitudes led to the departure of several programmers; notably, David Crane, Larry Kaplan, Alan Miller, and Bob Whitehead all left Atari due to lack of recognition and royalty payments, and formed Activision as a third-party 2600 developer, making many hit games in competition with Atari.

Unknown to anyone else, Robinett, inspired by popular rumors that the Beatles had hidden messages in songs, embedded his name in his game in the form of a hidden and virtually inaccessible room displaying the text "Created by Warren Robinett". In 2015, Robinett recalled the message had been a means of self-promotion, noting that Atari had paid him only around US$22,000 per year without any royalties while selling one million units of the game at US$25 each. This secret is one of the earliest known Easter eggs in a video game.

Robinett kept the secret for more than a year, even from Atari employees. He was unsure of whether it would be discovered by other Atari personnel prior to publishing. It is not mentioned in the game's manual, as the manual's author was unaware of it. After the game was released, Adam Clayton, a fifteen-year-old from Salt Lake City, discovered it and sent a letter of explanation to Atari. Robinett had already quit the company by this point, so Atari tasked designers with finding the responsible code. The employee who found it said that if he were to fix it, he would change the message to say "Fixed by Brad Stewart". Furthermore, the cost of creating a new read-only memory (ROM) mask, or memory chip, was around US$10,000 (equivalent to $39,075 in 2025) at the time of the game's release, making this change a costly proposal. Steve Wright, the director of software development of the Atari Consumer Division, argued for retaining the message, believing it gave players additional incentive to find it and play their games more; he suggested these were like Easter eggs for players to find. Atari eventually decided to leave the code unchanged and dubbed such hidden features "Easter eggs", saying they would be adding more such secrets to later games. Wright made it an official policy at Atari that all future games should include Easter eggs, often limited to being the initials of the game developer.

The Easter egg is accessed by setting the difficulty to level 2 or 3 and first retrieving the Gray Dot from the Black Castle catacombs. The Dot is a single-pixel object which is invisibly embedded in the south wall of a sealed chamber accessible only with the bridge, and the player must bounce the avatar along the bottom wall to pick it up. The dot can be seen when in a catacombs passage or when held over a normal wall, but it becomes invisible again when carried or dropped in most rooms. The dot is not attracted to the magnet, unlike all other inanimate objects. The player must bring the dot, along with two or more other objects, to the east end of the corridor below the Golden Castle. This causes the barrier on the right side of the screen to blink rapidly, allowing the player avatar to push through the wall into a new room displaying the words "Created by Warren Robinett" in text which continuously changes color.

The text was removed from the version on the Atari Classics 10-in-1 TV Games standalone gaming unit, replaced with "TEXT?" It has been included in most subsequent reissues of the game.

== Reception ==
Reception

Review scores
Publication	Score
AllGame	5/5
Electronic Games	9/10
How to Win at Home Video Games	4/10
Video Games Player	A−

Adventure received mostly positive reviews in the years immediately after its release and has generally been viewed positively since then.

Norman Howe reviewed Adventure in The Space Gamer No. 31. Howe commented that "Adventure is a good game, as video games are measured. It is neither as interesting nor as complex as Superman, but it shows great promise for things to come."

Bill Kunkel and Frank Laney in the January 1981 issue of Video called Adventure a "major design breakthrough" and that it "shatters several video-game conventions" such as scoring and time limits. They added that it was "much more ambitious" than average home video games, but the graphics were underwhelming, such as the hero being a square. The 1982 book How to Win at Home Video Games called it too unpredictable with an "illogical mission", concluding that "even devoted strategists may soon tire of Adventure's excessive trial and error." Electronic Games in 1983 stated that the game's "graphics are tame stuff", but it "still has the power to fascinate" and that "the action adventure concepts introduced in Adventure are still viable today". A separate review from 1983 in the magazine's Electronic Games 1983 Software Encyclopedia awarded the game a 9 out of 10 rating, praising its gameplay and single player gaming as excellent and outstanding respectively while only finding its graphics and sound as merely "good".

Jeremy Parish of 1UP.com wrote in 2010 that Adventure is "a work of interpretive brilliance" that "cleverly extracted the basic elements of exploration, combat and treasure hunting from the text games and converted them into icons", but also conceded that it "seems almost unplayably basic these days".

Atari Headquarters scored the game 8 of 10, noting its historical importance while panning the graphics and sound, concluding that Adventure was "very enjoyable" regardless of its technological shortcomings. In 1995, Flux magazine ranked Adventure 35th on their Top 100 Video Games. They described the game as: "challenging and incredibly fun."

== Legacy ==
Considered one of the first action-adventure video games and fantasy games for consoles, Adventure popularized the genres on video game consoles. It is the first video game to contain a widely known Easter egg and the first to allow a player to use multiple, portable, on-screen items while exploring an open-ended environment, making it one of the first examples of an open world game. The game is the first to use a fog of war effect in its catacombs, which obscures most of the playing area except for the player's immediate surroundings.

The game has been voted the best Atari 2600 game in numerous polls, and it has been noted as a significant step in the advancement of home video games. GamePro ranked it as the 28th most important video game of all time in 2007. In 2010, 1UP.com listed it as one of the most important games ever made in its "The Essential 50" feature. Entertainment Weekly named Adventure as one of the top 10 games for the Atari 2600.

A sequel to Adventure was first announced in early 1982. The planned sequel eventually evolved into the Swordquest series of games. In 2005, a sequel written by Curt Vendel was released by Atari on the Atari Flashback 2 system. In 2007, AtariAge released a self-published sequel called Adventure II for the Atari 5200, which is heavily inspired by the original. It was licensed by Atari, who later included the game in the Atari 50 compilation in 2023. Robinett himself took the idea of using items from Adventure into his next game, Rocky's Boots, but added the ability to combine them to form new items.

In both the 2011 novel Ready Player One and its 2018 film version the Easter egg in Adventure is prominently mentioned as the inspiration for a contest to find an Easter egg hidden in the fictional virtual reality game OASIS, and finding the secret room within Adventure is a core plot element within both versions, with footage from the game (specifically the Easter egg) incorporated into the film version.

The Lego Atari 2600 set includes three "cartridges" and three corresponding dioramas. The diorama for Adventure has a scene of the game's castle with an egg hidden at its center, referencing the Easter egg.

Atari SA, which holds the bulk of the intellectual property rights to the original Atari company, purchased the publishing rights for Tower of Samsara after developer Ilex Games had repeatedly failed to obtain funding for it. Atari reworked it into a re-imagining of Adventure for modern systems in a similar manner as Yars Rising, styled as a 2D platformer with Metroidvania gameplay elements. The game, now titled Adventure of Samsara, was released on September 4, 2025.

=== Re-releases ===
- Atari Classics 10-in-1 TV Games (Standalone hardware unit, 2003)
- Atari: 80 Classic Games in One (PC, 2003)
- Atari Flashback (Standalone hardware unit, 2004)
- Atari Anthology (PlayStation 2, Xbox, 2004)
- Atari Flashback 2 (Standalone hardware unit, 2005)
- Game Room (Xbox 360, PC, 2010)
- Atari Greatest Hits (Nintendo DS, iOS, 2010)
- Atari Flashback 3 (Standalone hardware unit, 2011)
- Atari Flashback 4 (Standalone hardware unit, 2012)
- Atari Vault (PC, 2016)
- Atari Flashback Classics, Vol. 2 (PS4, Xbox One, 2016, Switch, 2018)
- Atari Flashback Portable, 60 game and 70 game versions (2016, 2017)
- Atari Flashback 8 (2017)
- Atari Collection 1 (Evercade, 2020)
- Atari 50 (Switch, PS4, PS5, Xbox One, Xbox Series, PC, 2022)

== See also ==
- List of Atari 2600 games
