= RealSports Soccer =

1983 video game

- Developer: Atari, Inc.
- Publishers: Atari, Inc.
- Programmers: Michael Sierchio; Jerome Domurat
- Series: RealSports
- Platforms: Atari 2600, Atari 5200
- Release: US: April 1983; EU: 1983
- Genre: Sports
- Modes: Single-player, multiplayer

RealSports Soccer (also known as Soccer, Football and RealSports Football) is a 1983 sports video game developed and published by Atari, Inc. for the Atari 2600 and Atari 5200, concentrating on the sport of association football.

== Development ==
The game was part of a series of games released under the RealSports title for the Atari 2600, including RealSports Football, RealSports Volleyball, and RealSports Baseball. With the launch of the Atari 5200 a new version of the game was also developed for it, originally known simply as Soccer. The game was Atari's second association football-themed game after Pelé's Soccer.

The 2600 version was programmed by Michael Sierchio, with the computer-graphics being designed by Jerome Domurat. The 5200 version was programmed by John Seghers. The game was written in machine code. The original cover for the 2600 version was designed by Warren Chang, whilst the cover for the 5200 version was designed by Steve Hendricks. A version for the Atari 8-bit computers was also in development, but was cancelled in hope that it would sell more 5200 systems.

== Gameplay ==
RealSports Soccer on Atari 2600

The game includes only three players a side, with no human-controlled goal keeper. The gameplay scrolls horizontally over a play-area roughly three screens wide. During play the human player controls the sprite with the ball, whilst the computer AI controls the sprites of the players that are off the ball. To switch player the user selects the player nearest to the ball by pressing a joystick button, though the player is selected automatically by a successful pass. The Atari 5200 version featured computer-controlled goal-keepers.

== Reception ==
A review of RealSports Soccer in the March 1983 issue of the UK magazine TV Gamer criticized the high price of the game (nearly £30, or roughly £100 at 2020 prices), and summed up their impression of the game by saying "it's just football". The German magazine Telematch, in an April 1983 review criticized the lack of goalkeepers, the small play-area, and the general lack of realism in the game, ultimately giving the game a score of 4/6. A May 1983 review in the French gaming magazine Tilt also criticized the lack-lustre gameplay, though it praised the improved graphics over Atari's previous game, Pelé's Soccer. Tilt gave the game 4/5 for graphics but only 2/5 for its ability to hold interest. The 1984 Book of Atari Software criticized the lack of realism in RealSports Soccer for the 2600 platform, saying that it "lack[ed] the complexity and players to hold anyone's interest", and gave the game an overall score of "D". A review in the 1984 Software Encyclopedia was broadly positive about the game, particularly in head-to-head mode, giving it 7/10 overall.

An article in the November/December 1992 edition of Digital Press listed the game as one of the worst ever made for the Atari 2600, criticizing especially the poor graphics, sound, gameplay, and controls. A review of the Atari 5200 version of the game in the November/December 1997 edition of Digital Press was mildly more positive, praising the improved graphics over the Atari 2600 version, and the impressive (for its day) analog controls, though also criticizing the ease of scoring against the computer in the one-player version of the game, and gave it 5/10 overall.

== Reviews ==
- Games #41
- Games #44

== Legacy ==
The intellectual property rights for the game passed to Hasbro Interactive and were subsequently bought by Infogrames in 2001, which was subsequently renamed Atari SA. It was then re-released for the Atari Flashback 3 in 2011, which was the first console of the Flashback series made by the AtGames company. As of 2021, the game has been included on all subsequent Flashback consoles, including the Flashback 4, 5, 6, 7, 8, 9, and X.
