= Outlaw (1978 video game) =

1978 video game

- Box art by John Enright
- Developer: Atari
- Publisher: Atari
- Designer: David Crane
- Platform: Atari 2600
- Release: October 1978
- Genre: Shooter
- Modes: Single-player, multiplayer

Outlaw (Note: Known as Gunslinger for the Sears release of the Atari VCS) is a 1978 shooter video game developed at Atari by David Crane. The game has a Western setting, where one or two players either aim at targets or fellow gunfighters to reach 10 points in a set time. Several modes are available allowing for different obstacles and rules varying how the players move, how their bullets act and how the obstacles block the bullets.

It was the first video game Crane made for Atari after being hired in 1977. He described the making of it as a "trial by fire" to learn what he could and could not do within the limitations of the Atari Video Computer System (Atari VCS). (Note: The system became known as the Atari 2600 only after the release of the Atari 5200 in 1982.) Like many early games for the system, Outlaw is a variation of an existing arcade game, namely Gun Fight (1975). Upon release, it received positive reviews from Creative Computing, The Space Gamer and the Xenia Daily Gazette. It has since been re-released in various Atari-themed compilation packages.

== Theme and gameplay ==
Outlaw gameplay on the Atari 2600

Outlaw is a video game with a Western theme. Due to the limited technology and graphics of the 1970s, both arcade and console video games displayed artwork with montage of gunfighters, horses and covered wagons in its cabinet and box art to help illustrate these motifs to players. Outlaw can be played in a one or two-player mode. Each player can move up, down, left, and right on the screen. When holding down the button to aim, the player can control the angle the player will shoot at. Releasing the button fires a bullet.

In the one-player mode called "Target Shoot", the player controls the movement of a gunfighter with the joystick and practices shooting the various moving targets that appear. The player has 99 seconds to reach a maximum score of 10 points with one point awarded every time the player hits the moving target. In the two-player modes called "Gunslinger Games", each player controls a gunslinger and scores points for shooting the opposing gunslinger. When a player is hit, they sit down (rather than fall over dead). The first player to reach 10 points wins.

There are several variations to the gameplay. In "Blowaway" mode, bullets are more powerful and can destroy the center obstacles in the game, such as a stage coach, wall or a cactus, which block bullets in other gameplay modes. In "Getaway" mode, players can move immediately after shooting their gun instead of having to wait until their bullet vanishes for the screen or hits a target. In six shooter mode, each player's gun has six bullets and they both receive a new load of ammunition only after both players have used all six of their bullets.

== Development ==
Outlaw was developed by David Crane for Atari for the Atari Video Computer System (Atari VCS). Crane had previously worked at National Semiconductor. While playing tennis with his friend Alan Miller, he was told by Miller that Atari was looking for game programmers. After proofreading a newspaper ad Crane's friend had made for the work, he was interviewed the next day at 10 am and had the job by 2 pm. He officially started working for Atari in the third quarter of 1977. Outlaw was the first commercial game he made for the Atari VCS.

In 1976, Atari had released an arcade video game also titled Outlaw. Crane's Outlaw was not based on the gameplay mechanics of Atari's arcade game, and instead drew inspiration from Midway's arcade game Gun Fight (1975). He said Outlaw was influenced by Gun Fight and liked the idea of making a game with two opposing gunfighters. This version also reduced the controls to one control stick and button. He described that Atari was eager to quickly develop games based on popular arcade titles. Other companies had released similar games for their consoles since Gun Fight's release, such as Gunfighter for the RCA Studio II, and an official adaptation of Gun Fight was a built-in game on the Bally Professional Arcade.

Crane said that Outlaw was developed in about six months and that he worked extra hours to complete it. He described developing Outlaw as a "trial by fire", and said he was too ambitious on the project. He later reflected that the best thing about it was learning how to develop the gameplay elements so he could work on more complicated projects in the future and that "as the art advanced, we learned how to process the display kernels more efficiently, yielding more detailed graphics in later games."

== Release and reception ==
Outlaw was released for the Atari Video Computer System in October 1978. For the Sears release of the Atari VCS under their Tele-Games label, it was titled Gunslinger. Crane said the game sold over 500,000 units. It was re-released in various compilation formats for consoles and personal computers, such as the Atari 80 in One for Windows in 2003 and the Atari Anthology for PlayStation 2 and Xbox in 2004, and the Atari 50 compilation in 2022 for Nintendo Switch, PlayStation 4, Steam, and Xbox One. It was also released on portable devices as part of the Atari Greatest Hits release for the Nintendo DS and iOS. Following the release of the Atari 2600+ console in 2023, Atari SA published Outlaw for the system on a physical cartridge. The release featured new artwork from Brazilian graphic designer and frequent Atari collaborator Butcher Billy.

Retrospective review scores

Review scores
Publication	Score
AllGame	3.5/5
Game Informer	7/10

From contemporary reviews, David H. Ahl of Creative Computing appeared to have enjoyed Outlaw, stating that "after a couple of glasses of wine, Chris Cef and I went into fits of convulsive laughter playing this game and lost or ability to fire straight. This could happen to you!" Eric Thompson of The Space Gamer complimented the graphics and sound. They had few complaints about Outlaw other than that the character's gun was hard to see. Dick Cowan of the Xenia Daily Gazette found it to be one of the better Atari games, noting that the different variations of it could sustain players' interest.

From retrospective reviews, Brett Alan Weiss, writing for AllGame, said that Outlaw as a single-player game was overly simplistic and dull and was best played as a multiplayer game where competing against an opponent was much more fun, but was not as strong as the similar Combat (1977). He noted that the graphics were simplistic but typical for an Atari 2600 title of the time period. A review in Game Informer said that Outlaw was generally fun with the single-player mode becoming dull quickly, while the two-player games had a "simplistic appeal that's hard to deny."

== See also ==
- List of Atari 2600 games
- List of Atari, Inc. games (1972–1984)
- List of Western video games
