= RealSports Baseball =

1982 video game

- Atari 7800 cover showing the alternative title of "Baseball" and the "RealSports" trademark
- Developer: Atari, Inc.
- Publishers: Atari, Inc.
- Programmers: Jim Andreasen; Keithen Hayenga
- Series: RealSports
- Platforms: Atari 2600, Atari 5200, Atari 7800
- Release: 2600: October 1982; 5200: October 1983; 7800: March 1989
- Genre: Sports (baseball)
- Modes: Single-player, multiplayer

RealSports Baseball (also known as Super Baseball and simply as Baseball) is a 1982 baseball video game developed and published by Atari, Inc. for the Atari 2600. It was later launched on the Atari 5200 and 7800 machines. A version for the Atari 8-bit computers was also in development, but was cancelled.

The game was developed in response to an aggressive marketing campaign by Mattel and released as part of the RealSports game series. The Atari 5200 version of the game was positively reviewed both contemporarily and retrospectively. The game has been re-released by Atari SA who inherited the intellectual property in the game.

== Development ==
The game was part of a series of games released under the RealSports title for the Atari 2600, including RealSports Football, RealSports Volleyball, and RealSports Soccer. The series was conceived as an answer to Mattel Electronics's aggressive marketing campaign fronted by George Plimpton, in which they compared the graphically and gameplay-wise dated Atari 2600 sports games, including Atari's 1978 baseball game Home Run, to their more advanced Intellivision counterparts.

A version with "Voice Controller" support, an unreleased voice command device for the 2600, was announced at the 1983 Summer Consumer Electronics Show with a 1983 release date. In this version the pitching, the batting, and the fielding utilized the regular joystick, and the voice commands could be only used to throw the ball to the bases.

The originally-released RealSports Baseball included a number of software bugs that impaired the quality of play. As a result, an improved version for the 2600 platform entitled Super Baseball was subsequently released in March 1989, fixing some, but not all, of the errors. Super Baseball also included some graphical improvements.

With the launch of the Atari 5200 and Atari 7800 platforms new versions of the game were also developed for them. Jim Andreasen started to work on the 5200 version of RealSports Baseball right after he finished RealSports Football, but he later shelved the project citing burn out. After that Keithen Hayenga was assigned to finish the game, but because he wasn't satisfied with the graphics, he chose to start over the project from scratch. He was allowed to use an additional 8 kilobyte of ROM space to put in voice, and used half of it for additional game logic. Andreasen later helped to finish off the gameplay. The game was written in machine code. A version for the Atari 8-bit computers was also in development, but never released. In the years since, prototype copies of the game have become available. Atari halted the development of this version in hope that the game would sell more 5200 systems. The game was heavily used in advertisements of the system. The 5200 version is the first video game with voice, and doesn't require a separate add-on for the voice synthesis.

Despite the significantly improved graphics hardware of the Atari 7800, the 7800 version of the game features downgraded graphics and sounds compared to the 5200 version. It also has more limited gameplay and is generally buggier.

The cover art for the original 2600 release was done by Michel Allaire, whilst that for the 5200 release was drawn by D. Smith. Warren Chang created the interior artwork used in the manuals of both the 2600 and 5200 editions. The game's 1982 television advertising campaign was fronted by Oakland Athletics manager Billy Martin.

A modified version of the game titled Barroom Baseball, based on the Atari 5200 version, was planned for the coin-op market. The project was initial intended to target bar patrons but was ultimately shelved by Atari.

== Gameplay ==
Gameplay screenshot from the Atari 5200 version. The batter of the blue team managed to get the ball in play, the left fielder of the red team is selected to field the ball, indicated by his different sprite. The line score, count, and the number of outs are shown on the top of the screen.

In this game Atari improved on Home Run, their previous baseball-themed game for the 2600 platform, by including a baseball diamond, fly-balls, throwing of the ball by fielders to tag the opposing player out, and other traditional features of the sport of baseball. Players are able to use the joystick to select the kind of swing the batter will make, with bunts, grounders, and fly-balls all possible. The 2600 and 5200 versions of the game features four variations of play, with the player able to select between single-play and two-player and between the batter being able to strike any ball or only being able to hit balls from within the strike zone. The Atari 5200 version featured the voice of an electronic announcer calling the plays.

== Reception ==
A review of the original RealSports Baseball in the August 1983 issue of Electronic Games magazine praised the game, comparing it positively to Home Run, saying that "thanks to RealSports Baseball, Atari 2600 owners finally have a game they can love". A review of the 2600 version in the August-September 1983 issue of Vidiot magazine was critical of the game, describing the game as "lots better than Home Run, but not much more real". The 1984 Book of Atari Software described RealSports Baseball for the 2600 platform as "not the best baseball game" but "very playable" and "not a disappointing cartridge at all", and gave the game an overall score of "B". A review in the January 1984 edition of Video and Computer Gaming Illustrated wrote that the game gives players a chance to play strategically. In March 1984 the staff and writers of Video and Computer Gaming Illustrated also awarded the game their Vista prize in the category Best 2600 Sports, an accolade it shared jointly with Super Challenge Baseball.

The 5200 version was positively reviewed by Bill Kunkel in Electronic Games magazine in a May 1984 review, describing the game as "definitely a hit". A July 1984 review of baseball games in the same publication praised especially the improved controls and sound-effects of RealSports Baseball for the 5200. The 5200 version also won the Computer Entertainer (also known as Video Game Update) 1983 award in the Best Sports Game category jointly with Star League Baseball. The 2600 version received a Certificate of Merit in the Best Sports Videogame category at the 1984 Arkie Awards, while the 5200 version received one at the 1985 Arkie Awards.

Reviewing the enhanced 2600 version titled Super Baseball, in the May/June 1989 issue of Atarian magazine, John Jainschigg gave the game a positive review, describing it as an "amazing simulation".

In the 2007 book Classic Home Video Games, 1972–1984: A Complete Reference Guide, Brett Weiss reviewed the original RealSports Baseball negatively, criticizing the bugs. Weiss reviewed the subsequently-released Super Baseball version more positively as some of the bugs had been fixed. The Atari 5200 version of RealSports Baseball was positively received by Weiss, who said it "rival[ed] Pete Rose Baseball as the best baseball game ever made for any Atari system". Kieren Hawken, reviewing the game in The A–Z of Atari 8-bit Games: Volume 4 in 2021, praised the "colourful and well animated" graphics and the "very good" sound effects and sound, giving the game 7/10 overall.

The 5200 version was one of the most popular games for the system, and it got a reprint after Atari ceased development of new 5200 games.

== Legacy ==
The intellectual property rights for the game passed to Hasbro Interactive and were subsequently bought by Infogrames in 2001, which was subsequently re-named Atari SA. The 2600 version of the game was re-released by Infogrames on the 2005 Atari Anthology. It was then subsequently re-released for the Atari Flashback 3 in 2011, which was the first console of the Flashback series made by the AtGames company. As of 2021, the game has been included on all subsequent Flashback consoles, including the Flashback 4, 5, 6, 7, 8, 9, and X.
