= RealSports Boxing =

1987 video game

- Developer(s): Atari Corporation
- Publisher(s): Atari Corporation
- Programmer(s): Alex DeMeo
- Series: RealSports
- Platform(s): Atari 2600
- Release: December 1987
- Genre(s): Sports (boxing)
- Mode(s): Single-player, multiplayer

Gameplay screenshot

RealSports Boxing is a boxing video game developed by Atari Corporation and released in 1987 for the Atari 2600. It is part of the RealSports series of games from Atari. The game has a side view of the ring, allowing the player to move up and down, as well as from left to right. There are four selectable characters in the game, Lefty O'Leary, Jabbin' Jack, Macho Man, or Iron Fists. The aim of the game is to knock out the opposition by filling up a bar at the bottom of the screen which allows the player to deliver the knock out blow. The game can be played with two players simultaneously.

== Development ==
After the North American video game crash of 1983, no more RealSports titles were developed under the management of Warner Communications. After Jack Tramiel bought the consumer division of Atari, Inc. in 1984 and video game development got back into focus, it was decided that two more RealSports titles would be produced: RealSports Boxing and the Atari 7800 version of RealSports Baseball. The game was programmed by Alex DeMeo.

The game was heavily featured in the Atari 2600 Jr.'s advertisements.

The codebase of the game was later reused to create Absolute Entertainment's Title Match Pro Wrestling.
