= Atari Video Cube =

1983 video game

- Developer: Atari, Inc.
- Publishers: Atari, Inc.
- Programmer: Doug Macrae
- Platform: Atari 2600
- Release: 1983
- Genre: Puzzle
- Mode: Single-player

Atari Video Cube is a 1983 puzzle video game developed and published by Atari, Inc. for the Atari 2600. It was sold exclusively through the Atari Club, run by Atari itself. It was later re-released as Rubik's Cube.

== Gameplay ==
Menu screen, which allows selection of preconfigured cube layout

The game implements a Pocket Cube, Rubik's Cube and Rubik's Revenge. The player takes control of "Hubie the Cube Master" as he tries to solve a scrambled "Video Cube". Hubie's method for solving the cube is to pick up the colored segments one-by-one and place them in their correct spaces. Picking up a square, however, limits Hubie's movements; he cannot move onto a square that matches the color of the one he is carrying.

The game manual encourages players to try and solve the cube in as few moves as possible, with their total number of moves being counted at the bottom of the screen. Atari Video Cube has several game modes that alter the difficulty of the game, such as square count and color range.

== Development ==
Atari Video Cube was developed by Doug Macrae, one of the founders of General Computer Corporation. Following legal disputes with Atari, Inc., the company hired him to create games. He was told Atari would pay them $50,000 a month for two years to develop games, with no stipulation of how many games were to be developed. This led to GCC making arcade games Food Fight (1982) and Quantum (1982) for Atari.

Macrae said that as a lot of Atari programmers left to work at Activision and Imagic, this led to Atari asking GCC to develop games for Atari's home consoles. Macrae reflected on this in an interview published in 2024 stating "being the young, arrogant engineers out of MIT and Harvard that we were, we said, "Of course, absolutely.""

== Release ==
Atari Video Cube was later re-released as Rubik's Cube, an officially licensed title based on the popular toy Rubik's Cube. (pictured)

Atari Video Cube was initially released in 1983 and was only available through mail to Atari Club members. The game was later re-released as Rubik's Cube, a licensed title based on Rubik's Cube, a popular toy in the 1980s. in a form Tim Lapetino in Art of Atari described as a "marginally different" form than Atari Video Cube. Both releases features the same artwork on the packaging.

Atari Video Cube has been re-released for consoles and home computers in video game compilations, such as the Atari Anthology (2004) for PlayStation 2 and Xbox, and as downloadable content in 2024 for Atari 50 (2022) for Nintendo Switch, PlayStation 4, Steam, and Xbox One. It was also available in compilations for handheld formats, such as Atari Greatest Hits Volume 1 (2010) for the Nintendo DS and Atari's Greatest Hits for various iOS-based devices.

== Reception ==
From retrospective reviews, Brett Weiss in his book Classic Home Video Games, 1972-1984 (2011) found the game had crude sound that grew annoying, while complimenting the 3D-like effect of the cube turning as impressive. On reviewing the first two volumes of Atari Flashback Classics for the PlayStation 4 and Xbox One, Channing King specifically highlighted Atari Video Cube as one of the many Atari 2600 games that have aged poorly.
