= Bowling (1979 video game) =

1979 video game

- Box art by Cliff Spohn
- Developer: Atari, Inc.
- Publishers: Atari, Inc.
- Designer: Larry Kaplan
- Programmer: Larry Kaplan
- Platform: Atari 2600
- Release: January 26, 1979
- Genre: Sports (bowling)
- Modes: Single-player, multiplayer

Bowling is a 1979 sports video game developed and published by Atari, Inc. for the Atari 2600. (Note: The Atari VCS became known as the Atari 2600 only after the release of the Atari 5200 in 1982.) It is a simulation of tenpin bowling and sees the player attempting to knock down as many pins as possible with a ball in order to acquire a high score. There are six game modes that can selected from that influence the ball's movement and if a second player can participate for competitive multiplayer.

== Gameplay ==
A bowler rolling their ball down the lane towards two remaining pins. The player's score, as well as current game variation, is shown at the top of the screen.

Bowling is a sports video game that simulates tenpin bowling. The player controls a bowler on the left end of a horizontal lane and is tasked with getting a high score by the end of ten turns. At the start of each turn, the player is given two tries to hit as many of the ten bowling pins positioned on the lane as possible with their ball. The player's bowler can be moved up and down the lane to aim their ball's shot before releasing it at the pins. Each pin gives one point when hit, however knocking down all of them in one try awards the player a "strike" while hitting every pin in two tries gives a "spare". The player's final score is determined by how many points, strikes, and spares are earned, with the maximum score possible being 300 points.

There are a total of six game modes that impact how much the player can change their ball's trajectory once thrown as well as how many people can play. The first mode makes the ball movable in one direction after being thrown, the third allows it to go up and down after shooting, and the fifth doesn't allow the player to make any further adjustments. The rest of the modes are the same as those previously mentioned but allow two players to compete against one another, with each player being able to individually pick between the three ball movement options.

== Development ==
Bowling was designed by Larry Kaplan. It was his final game for Atari, Inc. before leaving the company.

Prior to the release of Bowling other games based around the sport of Bowling were released for home consoles such as Bowling (1978) for Fairchild Channel F (1978), Bowling/Basketball (1978) for Magnavox Odyssey 2 and APF's Bowling (1978). While the Fairchild Channel F game allowed the players to curve the ball, Kaplan's game allowed the players to not just influence the trajectory of the ball, but also position and control the on-screen figure of a bowler who swung their arm and launched the ball down the lane.

== Release and reception ==
Bowling was released on January 26, 1979 for the Atari VCS. It was re-released in various compilation formats, such as the Atari 80 in One for Windows in 2003 and the Atari Anthology for PlayStation 2 and Xbox in 2004. It was included in portable gaming compilations such as the Atari Greatest Hits for Nintendo DS and iOS-based devices. Bowling was added to the Atari 50 (2022) compilation release in 2023.

Bowling was reviewed by Video magazine in its "Arcade Alley" column where it was praised as "an enjoyable version of a sport that is perfectly suited to the video arcade format". The reviewers singled out the graphics (including the automatic frame-by-frame scoring and "deft" character animation) as "one of the game's best points". In Creative Computing, David H. Ahl complimented Bowling saying the sound effects made it a lively game. In his book The Complete Guide to Electronic Games (1981), Howard J. Blumenthal said the games control was a little awkward and that it lacked the "real feel" of the sport, while concluding that "despite all flaws, it's fun to play, over and over again."

== See also ==
- List of Atari 2600 games
- List of Atari, Inc. games (1972–1984)
