= Pelé's Soccer =

1981 video game

- Developer: Atari, Inc.
- Publishers: Atari, Inc.
- Designer: Steve Wright
- Platform: Atari 2600
- Release: February 1981
- Genre: Sports (football)
- Mode: Single-player

Pelé's Soccer, originally released as Championship Soccer (and using that name in modern compilations for trademark reasons), is a 1981 sports video game developed and published Atari, Inc. for the Atari 2600. Endorsed by famous footballer Pelé, it features ball-handing and goal-keeping techniques using the joystick.

== Gameplay ==
Pelé's Soccer on the Atari 2600

Each team has one forward, two defenders, and a goalkeeper on the field at all times. The player's goalkeeper is always controlled by the computer unless they save a shot. Each game consists of two halves of various time lengths (depending on the game settings being used). All the forwards and backs run in their proper formation. There are 54 different game variations (27 single-player and 27 multiplayer) that allow for different speeds, game lengths, and goal sizes.

== Releases ==
Originally planned for a 1980 holiday season release, Championship Soccer was delayed until February 1981. The game received the personal endorsement of Pelé himself, who appeared in commercials and even went on promotional tours for the game. This was a logical match as Pelé was still under contract with the New York Cosmos and as Atari Inc. were both part of Warner Communications. His endorsement came late in the development process of the game, as the original release bore the Championship Soccer name on both the box and the text-label cartridge, but Pelé's name and endorsement were appended to the cover of the instruction manual. As Atari shifted to picture-label cartridges, the game's name was formally changed to Pelé's Soccer.

Sears, under their OEM licensing deal with Atari, Inc., released the game under their Tele-Games brand, simply titled Soccer, and using the original Championship Soccer box art; although the game program was unchanged, the Tele-Games release never bore the Pelé name.

When Atari Corp. relaunched the 2600 in 1986 alongside the Atari 7800 ProSystem, which was backward-compatible with the 2600, they re-released Pelé's Soccer as a budget title to bolster the consoles' lineups. These releases are notable for the modifications to the 1981 black label design, featuring a copyright date of the year of production along with "Atari Corp." replacing "Atari, Inc.", and for the printing error of "Atari Game Program Instructions" beneath the title instead of the advisory "Use with Joystick Controllers".

Modern compilations of Atari 2600 games, such as Atari Greatest Hits, Atari Vault, and the Atari Flashback series, revert the game's name to its original title of Championship Soccer for trademark purposes, as the original endorsement deal has long expired.

== Reception ==
In 1981, three months after the change in name from Championship Soccer, Pelé came to the Benelux to promote it as Pelé's Soccer. Nicky Moeken, as manager of Atari Benelux, organized the 12 day tour, highlighted by the kickoff at Ajax - MVV and the amount of visitors/fans to the Wastora store in Zaandam. Sales for the game from that moment on increased fourfold and it was the Atari 2600 bestseller during the summer period.
