= Sky Diver =

1978 video game

- Arcade flyer
- Developer: Atari, Inc.
- Publishers: Atari, Inc.
- Designers: Arcade; Owen Rubin; 2600; Jim Huether
- Platforms: Arcade, Atari 2600
- Release: Arcade: NA: June 1978; 2600: NA: March 1979
- Genre: Action
- Modes: Single-player, multiplayer

Sky Diver is a 1978 video game developed and published by Atari, Inc. for arcades. An Atari VCS port by Jim Huether was published in 1979. The game is a third-person view of a parachuting drop zone. Sky Diver is a two-player game, although one player can play.

== Gameplay ==
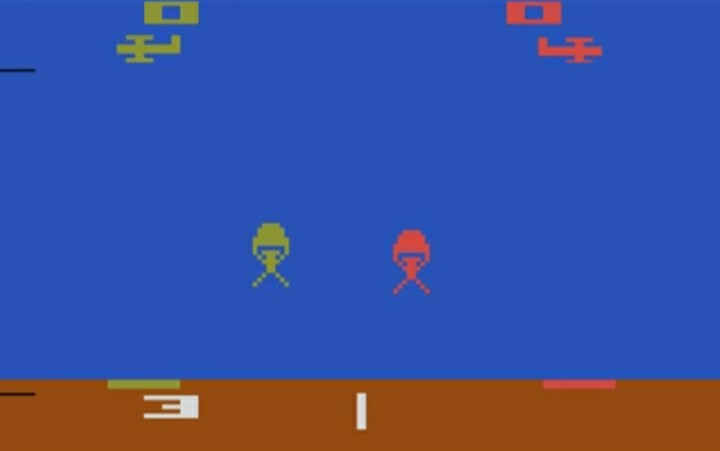
Gameplay screenshot

The object of Sky Diver is to jump out of a plane, release a parachute and land on the landing pad. To get higher points, the player must release the parachute closer to the ground. The player has nine jumps. If the landing pad is missed, the player loses points. The highest score possible is 99 points (11 points maximum per jump).

== Legacy ==
Sky Diver has been re-released as part of compilations such as Atari Anthology. In July 2010, the game was included on Microsoft's Game Room service.

A remake of the game has been announced for release exclusively for the Intellivision Amico.
