= Double Dunk =

1989 video game

- Box Art
- Developer: Atari Corporation
- Publisher: Atari Corporation
- Programmer: Matthew Hubbard
- Platform: Atari 2600
- Release: NA: 1989
- Genre: Sports
- Modes: Single-player, multiplayer

Double Dunk is a 1989 basketball video game developed and published by Atari Corporation for the Atari 2600. Programmed by Matthew Hubbard, who previously worked on Dolphin and Zenji for Activision, Double Dunk was one of the last games produced by Atari for the console.

== Gameplay ==
Screenshot

Double Dunk is a simulation of two-on-two, half-court basketball. Teams have two on-screen characters, a shorter "outside" man and a taller "inside" man. In a single-player game, the player controls the on-screen character closest to the ball, either the one holding the ball (on offense) or the one guarding the opponent with the ball (on defense). In two-player games, each player may control one of the two teams as in a one-player game, or both players may play on the same team against a computer-controlled opponent. At the start of each possession, both offense and defense select from a number of plays (such as the pick and roll on offense), then attempt to score or regain possession of the ball by intercepting or stealing it from the offense.

The game offers a number of player-selectable options. Games can be set to last a certain amount of time or until one team scores a certain number of points. Three-point shots can be turned on or off, as can a ten-second shot clock. Players may also choose to include foul detection and/or a three-second lane violation.

== Legacy ==
Double Dunk is included in the 2003 Atari Anthology collection. It was added to the Atari 50 (2022) compilation release in 2023.
