= Golf (Atari 2600 video game) =

1980 video game

- Cover art by Steve Hendricks
- Developer: Atari, Inc.
- Publishers: Atari, Inc.
- Programmer: Michael Lorenzen
- Platform: Atari 2600
- Release: 1980
- Genre: Sports (golf)
- Modes: Single-player, multiplayer

Golf is a 1980 golf video game developed and published by Atari, Inc. and the Atari 2600. (Note: The system became known as the Atari 2600 only after the release of the Atari 5200 in 1982.) The game allows one or two players to play nine holes of golf, featuring various obstacles.

Golf was the first game developed by Michael Lorenzen for Atari. On his first day of work, Lorenzen was instructed to observe a competitor's version of a golf video game and duplicate it for Atari. Lorenzen's Golf features similarities to Computer Golf for the Magnavox Odyssey 2, such as the viewpoint appearing closer to the cup. Lorenzen recalled the development of the game to be stressful, noting that he worked continuously to make the game fit into a two kilobyte ROM cartridge.

Lorenzen would also make Circus Atari (1980) for Atari and later work at Activision and Accolade before leaving the video game industry. Retrospective reviews of Golf from Allgame and Electronic Games have been indifferent, with Brett Alan Weiss noting the game's blocky graphics and simple sound hid an "enjoyably challenging" video game.

== Gameplay ==
A course in Golf. The course is the green patches while the blue background represents the rough.

Golf is a video game based on the traditional game of golf. It can be played as a single player game or two players taking turns after each course. There are nine courses where the goal of the player is to hit the ball into the cup. Swinging the club in an attempt to hit the ball is known as a stroke. While the number of strokes is unlimited, each course has a designated "par", representing the average number of strokes it should take to complete the course. The total par for the game is 36. Using the difficulty switch on the Atari, the "B" position indicates an easier mode with the cup being larger and the ball stopping at the edge of the rough. In the "A" position, the cup is smaller and the ball can end up in the rough.

The player uses the controller to swing the club and hit the ball. The longer the button is held on the joystick, the longer the backswing will be; this is the method used to control the power of each hit. The golfer always faces towards the ball and it will travel perpendicular to the club.

The courses are covered in hazards, sand traps, trees and the rough. If a tree is hit with enough momentum, the ball will bounce backwards. If it hits a water hazard, it will be returned to the fairway closest to where it entered and the player will receive an extra stroke penalty. Balls caught in sand traps become invisible and lose momentum when hit. When a ball hits the rough, represented by the blue patches, it will lose all momentum. The ball in the rough will be invisible and have half its regular momentum when hit.

== Development ==
Golf was developed by Mike Lorenzen for Atari and the Atari 2600 console. Lorenzen studied computer science at college. He got his job at Atari by first calling to ask for Atari 2600 hardware manuals as he had been taking apart games at home such as Combat (1977) and Basketball (1978) to see how they worked. After discussing with George Simcock, the manager of Atari 2600 software engineers, Lorenzen said he knew the machine well enough that he made his own development system for the console. He was then invited to meet with Simcock at Atari headquarters. Simcock met with David Crane, Al Miller, Larry Kaplan and Bob Whitehead and joined the team at Atari three months later in 1979.

On Lorenzen's first day, he was told to go to the address of a store where he could play a competitors game in a lobby. Lorenzen could not confirm, but believes it may have been Computer Golf for the Magnavox Odyssey 2. He was told to implement the game exactly for Atari's console. At the time of development, there were only a few other golf-themed games on the market, such as the Apple II's text-based Pro Golf 1. Among the elements similar to the Magnavox game was when the player hit a shot close to the goal, its viewpoint would zoom into the green and the player. Lorenzen he felt he defied Atari's orders to duplicate the game, saying that after a few hours of playing and making mental notes "I was not going to make a copy. I was going to make an enhanced version, a statement."

It was common for Atari at the time that developers would make the games independently, creating the game, its graphics and writing the manual. Lorenzen said he spent six months on Golf and worked 100-hours weeks. The biggest challenge was to fit the code into a two kilobyte (KB) ROM chip. Lorenzen recalled he first made the game about 3.7 KB and would have to constantly optimize it to try and fit it into 2 KB all while retaining the gameplay. He later stated the whole ordeal was "a stressful period. I remember it was three or four days without sleep in the last big push." Other issues involved a bug that made the ball in the game vanish between the fairway and green.

== Release ==
Upon the release of Space Invaders in early 1980 for the Atari 2600, it became an instant hit for the company, earning them over $100 million. This led to Atari rescheduling their product from the holiday season to get as much of their products released throughout the year. Golf was released in 1980 and was published by Atari. Newspapers promoted the cartridge being available in June 1980. Golf was re-released in various compilation formats, such as the Atari 80 in One for Windows in 2003, Atari Anthology for PlayStation 2 and Xbox in 2004, and Atari Greatest Hits: Volume 2 for Nintendo DS in 2011.

The cover art of Golf was done by Steve Hendricks. Hendricks had moved to the San Francisco Bay Area showing his portfolio and meeting with Jim Kelly of Atari. He joined the company in 1977 and worked in the coin-op division creating art for arcade cabinets. Hendricks met with developers to implement features of the games in their work and most projects like Golf were relatively straightforward. Golf featured art in the montage style Cliff Spohn had developed as a regular in-house style for Atari. He made two different pieces of work for Golf with acrylics and gouache. He opted to use the second one for the final art.

== Reception and legacy ==
Reception

Review scores
Publication	Score
AllGame	3/5
Electronic Games	6/10

From retrospective reviews, the 1984 Software Encyclopedia from the writers of Electronic Games rated the audio, graphics and gameplay as fair and that it was good as a single player or two player game, giving it an overall six out of ten rating. Brett Alan Weiss writing for AllGame found the game to be "drastically simplified" noting the simple sound effects and blocky graphics hid the more "enjoyably challenging" nature of the game.

Along with Golf, Lorenzen would make Circus Atari (1980) for Atari and would later turn-down the offer to make Pac-Man for the Atari 2600. He worked in the Atari 8-bit computer division before joining Activision and later Accolade. He left the video games to work in the telephone industry.

Between 1984 and 1985, Atari Corporation (Note: Atari Corporation is a separate entity and should not be confused with Atari, Inc., Atari Interactive or Atari SA.) would sell filing cabinets filled with game source code, production documents and marketing diagrams. One customer purchased filing cabinets that were set to go into the trash for two dollars apiece. Inside were design diagrams for in-house games, graphics and artwork for several games including Golf. In 2007, Sotheby's estimated the documents were worth between $150,000 to $250,000.

== See also ==
- List of Atari 2600 games
- List of golf video games
