= Liberator (video game) =

1982 video game

- Arcade flyer
- Developer: Atari, Inc.
- Publishers: Atari, Inc.
- Designer: Dennis Harper
- Platform: Arcade
- Release: November 1982
- Genre: Shoot 'em up
- Modes: Single-player, multiplayer

Liberator is a 1982 shoot 'em up video game developed and published by Atari, Inc. for arcades. It is based on the Atari Force comic book series published by DC Comics from 1982 to 1986. Liberator has been described as the opposite of Missile Command, in that the player destroys cities from space instead of defending them from the ground. Only 762 arcade machines were made.

The story "Code Name: Liberator" describes the premise of the arcade game in detail and was included as a special insert in two comic books cover dated January 1983. Characters and concepts from the comic exist throughout the game. In the opening screen of the arcade game, Commander Champion of the "Atari Force" asks the player to help free the galaxy from the evil Malaglon Army.

== Gameplay ==
The player controls four spacecraft positioned at the corners of the screen. A trackball moves a targeting cursor, while the fire button causes the spacecraft nearest the cursor to fire. A second button activates shields around the spacecraft.

Each star system begins with a hyperspace sequence in which enemy spacecraft attempt to collide with the player's ships. Shields cannot be used during this sequence. After the enemy ships have been destroyed, the game moves to a rotating planet containing missile bases. The player must destroy the bases while defending the four spacecraft from incoming attacks.

Later levels introduce additional hazards. Missile bases can become satellites, while other enemies include flying saucers, fireballs and multi-warhead missiles. A master base appearing in later star systems can alter the speed or direction of the planet's rotation to make itself more difficult to hit. Each star system contains three planetary levels, with the number and variety of obstacles increasing as the game progresses.

At the beginning of a game, the player can choose to start at an advanced level. The available starting levels increase in increments of three, up to level 22.

== Release ==
Liberator was shipped in November 1982.

== Legacy ==
Liberator was released for Microsoft Windows, Xbox, and PlayStation 2 in 2003 as part of Atari Anthology, a collection of Atari arcade and 2600 games.
