= Flag Capture =

1978 video game

- Box art by John Enright
- Developer: Atari, Inc.
- Publishers: Atari, Inc.
- Designer: Jim Huether
- Platform: Atari 2600
- Release: October 1978
- Genre: Puzzle
- Modes: Single-player, multiplayer

Flag Capture is a puzzle video game published in 1978 by Atari, Inc. for the Atari Video Computer System (renamed to the Atari 2600 in 1982). It is based on the traditional game Capture the flag, and was designed and programmed by Jim Huether.

The game was later included with the Atari Flashback 3 console.

== Gameplay ==
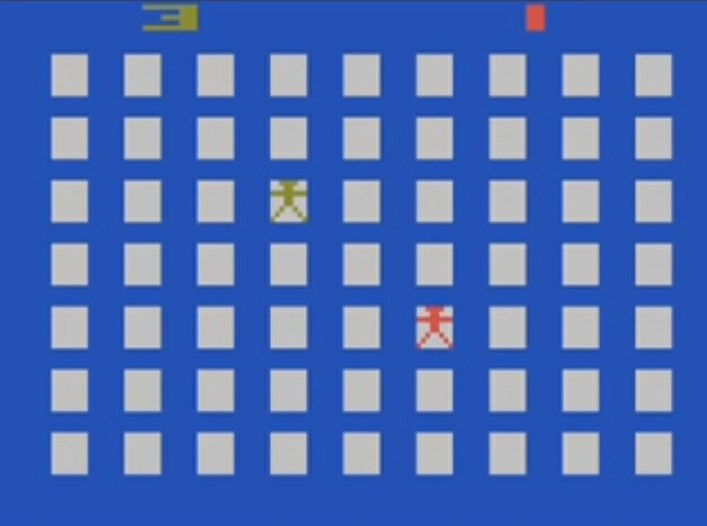
Gameplay screenshot

The player is shown a grid with white squares in it and must guess which square the flag is behind. To aid the locating of the flag the player may be shown an arrow or a number to indicate where the flag may be.

The game may be played in single-player mode, or in a two-player mode where the players play together.

== Reception ==
In a retrospective review, videogamecritic.com criticised the controls, the gameplay, the sound, and the graphics. In Classic Home Video Games, 1972-1984: A Complete Reference Guide, Brett Weiss described it as "one of the most primitive looking (and sounding) games ever".

In 1981, Capture the Flag was among a number of Atari games recommended by neuropsychologist Lance Trexler for use in cognitive rehabilitation as it trained coordination of visual input with motor output. It was also used in a psychological test carried out on subjects from the US Navy related to skill-retention.

== See also ==
- List of Atari 2600 games
