= Demons to Diamonds =

1982 video game

- Developer: Atari, Inc.
- Publishers: Atari, Inc.
- Designer: Nick Turner
- Programmer: Nick Turner
- Artist: Alan Murphy
- Platform: Atari 2600
- Release: July 1982
- Genre: Fixed shooter
- Modes: Single-player, multiplayer

Demons to Diamonds is a 1982 fixed shooter video game developed and published by Atari, Inc. for the Atari 2600. Set in a “cosmic carnival”, the gameplay is based around shooting at demons and collecting their dropped diamonds to score points, while avoiding the fire of hostile skulls.

It was programmed by Nick Turner with graphics designed by Alan Murphy. Nick Turner previously ported Super Breakout to the 2600.

== Gameplay ==
Gameplay screenshot

The player operates a laser base at the bottom of a multi-row playfield, using the paddle controller to move it from side to side and the controller's action button to fire a laser beam vertically up the playfield. The player can control how far onto the playfield the beam advances by releasing the button at the desired height. Demons begin to appear at various rows on the playfield and cross the screen horizontally. The player must shoot demons whose color matches that of the gun. If successful, the demon transforms into a diamond, which can itself be shot for additional points. If a player shoots a demon of a different color, the demon transforms into a skull, which can shoot the player with its own laser beam. The skull cannot be destroyed by the player but will disappear after a short time.

The player receives one point for each demon and ten points for each diamond successfully shot. Points are multiplied by the distance from the base to the target. For example, a demon shot one row above the player is worth one point, while a demon shot four rows above the player is worth four points.

In multiplayer mode, the second player operates a laser base at the top of the screen, firing from top to bottom. Again, the second player must shoot demons that match the color of its gun in order to produce diamonds, but the diamonds may be shot by either player. Also, skulls are capable of shooting both up and down the playfield. In select variations of the game, the players can shoot their opponent's laser gun in order to deplete their stock of extra lives.

In both single and multiplayer versions, players begin with five lives. One life is lost when the player's laser base is hit by a laser beam fired by a skull or by an opponent, depending on the game variation being played. The game ends when all lives are lost; in multiplayer versions, the surviving player receives a bonus for each life remaining.

== Reception ==
Demons to Diamonds was released in July 1982.

Bill Kunkel and Arnie Katz of Electronic Games in 1983 described Demons to Diamonds as a "video sleeping pill".

== See also ==
- List of Atari 2600 games
