= Home Run (video game) =

1978 video game

- Box art by Cliff Spohn
- Developer: Atari, Inc.
- Publishers: Atari, Inc.
- Programmers: Bob Whitehead; David Rolfe
- Platform: Atari 2600
- Release: October 1978
- Genre: Sports (baseball)
- Modes: Single-player, multiplayer

Home Run for the Atari 2600

Home Run is a 1978 baseball video game developed and published by Atari, Inc. for the Atari 2600 (originally known as the Atari Video Computer System). It was the first baseball-themed game released for an Atari platform. The game received mostly negative critical reception due to its unrealistic portrayal of the sport. It was one of the games used by console competitor Mattel to show the quality improvement of Intellivision sports games over the Atari VCS.

Atari replaced Home Run with RealSports Baseball in 1982.

== Gameplay ==
Teams have only one to three players, and the fielders must run with the ball to tag players out, with throwing of the ball to force players out not being possible. There is no pitcher's mound, with the pitcher instead standing at second base. The game lacks fly balls and independent fielders.

Depending on the selected game mode, only zero to two infielders are present in the game, and when either the pitcher or one of the infielders catches the ball everyone but the baserunners and the ball-catcher instantly disappears from view. The home team has to bat at the bottom of the 9th inning regardless of whether they are winning or not, and there is no extra innings if the game is tied.

== Development and marketing ==
Home Run was designed and programmed by Bob Whitehead, who went on to found Activision, and David Rolfe. The cover art was designed by Cliff Spohn.

According to a 1978 New York Times interview with Nolan Bushnell, the engineer who was first assigned to develop the game didn't know the rules of the sport of baseball. As a result, in an initial version of the game if the player failed to hit the ball they were awarded a ball rather than a strike.

A television advertising campaign for the game (and the Atari VCS as a whole) was fronted by Pete Rose. The game was one of the games used in advertisements by console competitor Mattel to show the quality improvement of Intellivision sports games over the Atari VCS.

== Reception ==
A review in the December 1982 issue of JoyStik magazine was heavily critical of the game, stating that it was "nothing like real baseball", and describing the graphics as "primitive". The 1984 Software Encyclopedia published by Electronic Games magazine was similarly critical of the game, saying that it lacks "the "feel" of real sports action", and giving it an overall rating of 4/10. Writing in The Player's Strategy Guide to Atari VCS Home Video Games, Electronic Games editors Arnie Katz and Bill Kunkel called the game, "so pared down from the original sport that it only barely qualifies as a baseball simulation," stating that, "it might more accurately be called 'Video Stickball'."

A December 2000 review by Patrick Wong in Classic Gamer magazine panned the game, describing it as (together with Atari's Golf) "two of the worst games ever made". Wong criticised the "boring" graphics, the small number of fielders deployable in the game, and the unrealistic gameplay, and summed the game up by saying "Gamers looking for a real baseball experience will have to look elsewhere". A review in the January/February 2003 issue of Digital Press was overwhelmingly negative, describing it as "a big stinker", "one of the worst games ever designed" with graphics that are "inexcusably bad". Bret Weiss writing in Classic Home Video Games, 1972–1984: A Complete Reference Guide praised the variety of the options for pitching but found the graphics and gameplay lack-lustre. Kieren Hawken writing in The A–Z of Atari 2600 Games: Volume 2 criticised the excessively basic game-play and graphics and compared it negatively to later baseball games developed for the Atari 2600 where the developers had better utilised the platform's resources.

== Legacy ==
In an aggressive marketing campaign by Mattel Electronics, the game was compared to its graphically and gameplay-wise more advanced Intellivision counterpart Major League Baseball, sparking off the first console war.
