= Space War =

1978 video game

- Developer: Atari, Inc.
- Publishers: Atari, Inc.
- Programmer: Ian Shepard
- Platform: Atari 2600
- Release: NA: October 1978
- Genre: Multidirectional shooter
- Modes: Single-player, multiplayer

Space War on Atari 2600

Space War is a multidirectional shooter video game released by Atari, Inc. in 1978 for the Atari Video Computer System (renamed to the Atari 2600 in 1982). The game is a version of Spacewar!, the 1962 computer game by Steve Russell. It was released by Sears as Space Combat for its Atari compatible Tele-Games system. A version for the Atari Lynx was planned but never released.

== Variations ==
The cartridge includes 17 game variations. Variations 1–13 are duels between two ships and 14 to 17 are for one player. In some of the variations the ships fight near a planet which has gravitational attraction.
