= Off the Wall (1989 video game) =

1989 video game

- Developer: Axlon
- Publisher: Atari Corporation
- Platform: Atari 2600
- Release: 1989
- Genre: Block breaker
- Mode: Single-player

Off the Wall is a 1989 video game developed by Axlon and published by Atari Corporation for the Atari 2600. It is a clone of Breakout with an Oriental theme. Axlon was a game development studio owned by Atari founder Nolan Bushnell. Off the Wall was one of the last games released by Atari for the 2600. It contains a 16K ROM.

Unlike Breakout and Super Breakout, Off the Wall is controlled with a joystick and not the paddle controllers.

== Gameplay ==
Gameplay screenshot

Players take control of the hero Kung Fu Lu, and the objective is to smash through an evil wall to kill a dragon that has been tormenting villagers. In the game, Lu receives several power-ups to achieve his goal, and he must overcome a bat that stands in his way.
