= RealSports Tennis =

1983 video game

- Atari 2600 box art
- Developer: Atari, Inc.
- Publishers: Atari, Inc.
- Programmers: 5200; Sean W. Hennessy
- Series: RealSports
- Platforms: Atari 2600, Atari 5200, Atari 8-bit
- Release: April 1983
- Genre: Sports
- Modes: Single-player, multiplayer

RealSports Tennis is a sports video game developed and published by Atari, Inc. for the Atari 2600, Atari 5200, and Atari 8-bit computers in 1983. It is part of the RealSports series of games.

== Gameplay ==
A game in progress

Before the game starts, players have to name their character, a first for an Atari 2600 game, and choose between one and two player mode and the two pre-set difficulty levels ("slow" and "fast").

In the game, one player with a blue shirt plays tennis against an AI enemy portrayed by a non-player character (NPC) with a red shirt. In the two-player mode, one player competes against another player locally. Players can move vertically and horizontally on the map. With the one button on the Atari 2600 controller, players make the serve. Every further shot is automatic if the ball has physical contact with the player. For every ball that falls on the opposing playing field, players get 15 points which they can see at the top part of the screen. After they reached 30 points, they only get 10 points for each other ball. After 40 points, they won one round. The number of rounds won goes up to 6. After winning 6 rounds, a new pile is opened at the top part of the screen which again goes up to 6. The first player who won two piles of 6 rounds wins the game.

== Development ==
The 2600 version's programmer is unknown, while the 5200 and Atari 8-bit computer versions were coded by W Sean Hennessy. Atari's Director of Software George Kiss assigned the project to Hennessey knowing that he is a tennis fan. He did the 5200 version first and then ported the game to the Atari 8-bit computers. The game was so well received that Hennessey could choose his next project, which was uncommon among new Atari employees.

The Atari 5200 version is slower than the Atari 2600 version.

== Legacy ==
The intellectual property rights for the game passed to Hasbro Interactive and were subsequently bought by Infogrames in 2001, which was subsequently renamed Atari SA. In 2018, the game was re-released by AtGames on their Flashback portable platform.

== See also ==
- List of Atari 2600 games
- List of Activision games: 1980–1999
- Tennis, another tennis game, developed by Activision
