= Codebreaker (video game) =

1978 video game

- Box art by Cliff Spohn
- Developer: Atari, Inc.
- Publishers: Atari, Inc.
- Platform: Atari 2600
- Release: October 1978
- Genre: Puzzle
- Modes: Single-player, multiplayer

Codebreaker is a puzzle video game released in 1978 by Atari, Inc. for the Atari VCS (later renamed the Atari 2600). It was in the first wave of Atari VCS games to follow the original nine launch titles. It was one of three cartridges to accompany the introduction of the Atari keyboard controller, an add-on launched in response to claims of false advertising that the VCS is a "computer" (the other two were Hunt & Score and Brain Games).

== Gameplay ==
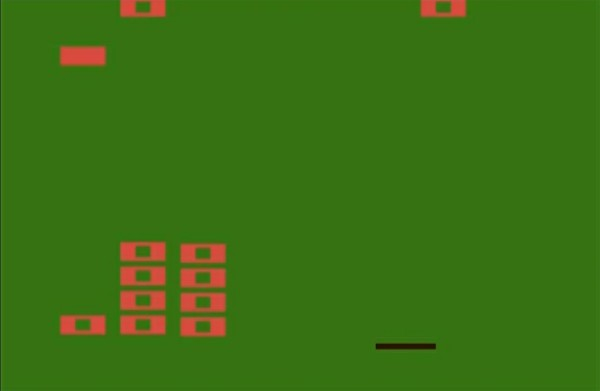
Screenshot of Nim

There are three games, each with six variations: Bagels, Nim, and Mastermind. In each game the player must take turns to guess a numerical code and enter it using the keyboard controller.

The games may be played in single-player mode, or in a two-player mode where the players play together.

== Reception ==
Contemporary reviewers were relatively positive about the game but all mentioned its similarity to Mordecai Meirowitz's Mastermind. The British computer games magazine TV Gamer, described it as "not the most original game" but also described it as an enjoyable brain-teaser. Personal Computing Magazine described it as "[b]ased on the Mastermind concept".

== See also ==
- List of Atari 2600 games
