= Backgammon (1979 video game) =

1979 video game

- Box art by Cliff Spohn
- Developer: Atari, Inc.
- Publishers: Atari, Inc.
- Platform: Atari 2600
- Release: November 1979
- Genre: Strategy
- Modes: Single-player, multiplayer

Backgammon is a video game adaptation of the board-game backgammon, developed by Atari, Inc. for the Atari Video Computer System (later the Atari 2600) and released in 1979.

The cover art for the game was by Cliff Spohn, who created the cover art for many early Atari games.

== Gameplay ==
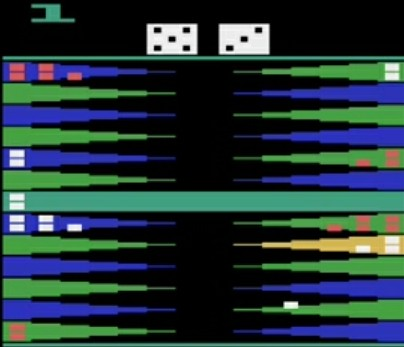
Gameplay screenshot

Eight different modes of playing backgammon were included in the game, including "Acey deucey". A doubling cube was available in-game for use in gambling. The rolling of the dice and other gaming operations were controlled via the paddle/joystick. The game was playable in both single-player and two-player, competitive mode.

== Reception ==
Contemporary reviewers were relatively positive about the game. In an October 1979 review, American computer magazine Creative Computing described the game as "excellent for someone learning Backgammon" and as "provid[ing] an interesting challenge to beginner to intermediate players". UK-based TV Gamer called it "fairly challenging" in one-player mode.

In Classic Home Video Games, 1972-1984: A Complete Reference Guide, Brett Weiss described it as "user friendly and clearly defined", although he also noted that it was easy to beat the computer.

== See also ==
- List of Atari 2600 games
