= Human Cannonball (video game) =

1979 video game

- Box art by Cliff Spohn
- Developer: Atari, Inc.
- Publishers: Atari, Inc.
- Designer: Owen Rubin (arcade)
- Platform: Atari 2600
- Release: March 1979
- Genre: Artillery
- Modes: Single-player, multiplayer

Human Cannonball is a 1979 artillery video game developed and published by Atari, Inc. for the Atari VCS (later renamed the Atari 2600). The goal is to launch a performer from a cannon so they land in container of water supported by a tower. The game was in the first wave of Atari VCS games after the original nine launch titles. It was also among the first games for the console to be discontinued by Atari.

Although the programmer is unknown, the game is based on an unreleased arcade video game designed by Owen Rubin, called Cannonball. The cover art for the game is by Cliff Spohn, who created the cover art for many early Atari games.

== Gameplay ==
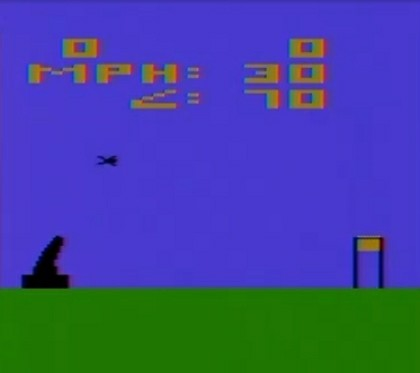
Gameplay screenshot

The player must fire a cannon at the correct angle and speed to fire a human cannonball (a man shot from a cannon) into a water tower. each time the player records a "hit" they receive one point, whilst the computer receives a point each time the player misses, with the winning side being the first to get seven points. Eight different modes of play are available, with the differences between play-modes deciding whether the player can vary the distance from the cannon to the tower. The player may also vary the size of the water tower to make it easier to hit.

The game may be played in single-player mode, or in a two-player mode where each player takes turns.

== Reception ==
Contemporary reviewers were relatively positive about the game. British magazine TV Gamer, praised its "nice" graphics. In an October 1979 review, Creative Computing described the game as "good fun" but easy to master, and described the game as being modelled on a previous game called Shoot.

Modern reviewers have been more negative about Human Cannonball. In Classic Home Video Games, 1972-1984: A Complete Reference Guide, Brett Weiss described it as "limited in nature and in scope". In contrast, Adventure: The Atari 2600 at the Dawn of Console Gaming described it as "good quality".

== See also ==
- List of Atari 2600 games
