= A Game of Concentration =

1978 video game

- Developer: Atari, Inc.
- Publishers: Atari, Inc.
- Designer: Jim Huether
- Platform: Atari 2600
- Release: October 1978
- Genre: Card game
- Modes: Single-player, multiplayer

A Game of Concentration (also known as Concentration and Hunt & Score) is a video game programmed by Jim Heuther of Atari, Inc. and released in 1978 for the Atari VCS (later renamed to the Atari 2600). It is a digital version of the classic memory game played with cards. A Game of Concentration is one of a handful of games that use Atari's keypad controllers.

The game was released by Sears for its Tele-Games Video Arcade console under the name Memory Match.

== Gameplay ==
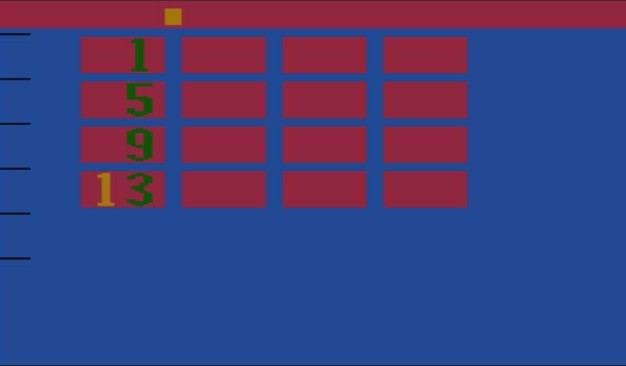
Gameplay screenshot

The game is played using a matrix of numbered panels, either 4 x 4 (for 16 panels) or 5 x 6 (for 30 panels). Using the keypad, players enter the number of the panels they wish to reveal. If the images behind the two panels match, the panels are removed and the player scores 1 or 2 points, depending on what difficulty the switch is set to, along with an extra turn.

The game has a total of eight variations, four each for each matrix size and four have wild cards. Each matrix can be played by either a single player or by two players taking turns; in single-player games, the player attempts to clear the matrix with as few incorrect matches as possible. Also, players can enable wild cards that will match any image on the board.

== See also ==
- List of Atari 2600 games
