= Combat (video game) =

1977 video game

- Box art by Cliff Spohn
- Developer: Atari, Inc.
- Publishers: Atari, Inc.
- Programmers: Ron Milner; Steve Mayer; Joe Decuir; Larry Wagner
- Platform: Atari 2600
- Release: 1977
- Genre: Shooter
- Mode: Multiplayer

Combat is a shooter video game developed and published by Atari, Inc. as a launch title for the 1977 Atari Video Computer System (later called the Atari 2600). Two players, controlling either tanks, biplanes, or jets, fire missiles at each other for two minutes and sixteen seconds. Points are scored by hitting the opponent, and the player with more points when the time runs out wins. Variations on the gameplay introduce elements such as invisible vehicles, missiles that ricochet off of walls, and different playing fields.

Based on Atari's 1974 arcade video game Tank, Combat was initially developed by Steve Mayer and Ron Milner. Joe Decuir tested it on the in-development Atari VCS hardware. Larry Wagner completed the game and added the two plane variations.

By the early 1980s, Combat's graphics and gameplay were seen as being out-of-date. A sequel titled Combat Two was planned for the Atari 2600, but never completed. A prototype of the sequel was later released in various formats. Retrospective reception by publications such as Classic Gamer Magazine and AllGame have praised the game, while PCMag and Flux considered it to be one of the best Atari 2600 games and one of the greatest video games of all time.

== Gameplay ==
The "Tank" variation, played from an overhead view with the score at the top.

Combat uses two four-directional joysticks, one for each player. The game has several modes of gameplay: "Tank", "Biplane" and "Jet" and with variations of the above models. The tank and jet modes are viewed from a top-down perspective while biplane games are side view. In all forms of the game, pushing the button fires a missile. Hitting the other player with a missile scores a point. The player with the most points at the end of a two minutes and sixteen second round wins. Variations of the gameplay in Tank mode include adding obstacles to maneuver around, having the missiles rebound off of walls (referred to as Tank-Pong) and a mode where the tanks are invisible except when they are firing a missile or are hit by one. In the other two modes, Jet and Biplane, there are no obstacles, and both aircraft continuously move forward. These levels have options for obscuring clouds that the planes can hide behind. The original 1977 Atari VCS has six switches in front, including left and right difficulty switches and a game select switch. The difficulty switches change the range of fire of the missiles and in the plane-based games also changes the speed of flight.

In his article "Combat in Context", Nick Montfort stated it was difficult to place the game genre to Combat as assigning one to it would be considered anachronistic. AllGame would later categorize it as a shooter game.

== Development ==
Combat was programmed while the hardware of the Atari Video Computer System was still under development. Steve Mayer was developing the game by late 1975. The original version was a tank game made on the early prototype Atari 2600 hardware engineered by Mayer and Ron Milner from Cyan Engineering, a consulting firm that Atari purchased in 1975. The VCS hardware was designed to be capable of playing Atari's popular arcade games Pong (1972) Pong Doubles (1973), Quadrapong (1974), Gran Trak 10 (1974), Tank (1974), and Jet Fighter (1975). Combat was based on the Tank.

Combat was made to fit into a two kilobyte cartridge's ROM. In his academic journal article Combat in Context, Nick Monfrot stated that the game was coded in assembly language by Joe Decuir, who was working on the final VCS hardware with Jay Miner. Decuir has deferred much of the credit on the game, stating that "Ron Milner and Steve Mayer conceived of what became Combat, I was an implementer [...] I worked on it mostly as a test case for the hardware". After Decuir completed his work on the game, the code was finished by Larry Wagner, the head of Atari's new VCS programming team. Wagner refined the tank games and added both the aircraft modes. Decuir later proclaimed that Wagner "made the Combat display engine a lot more fun."

== Release ==
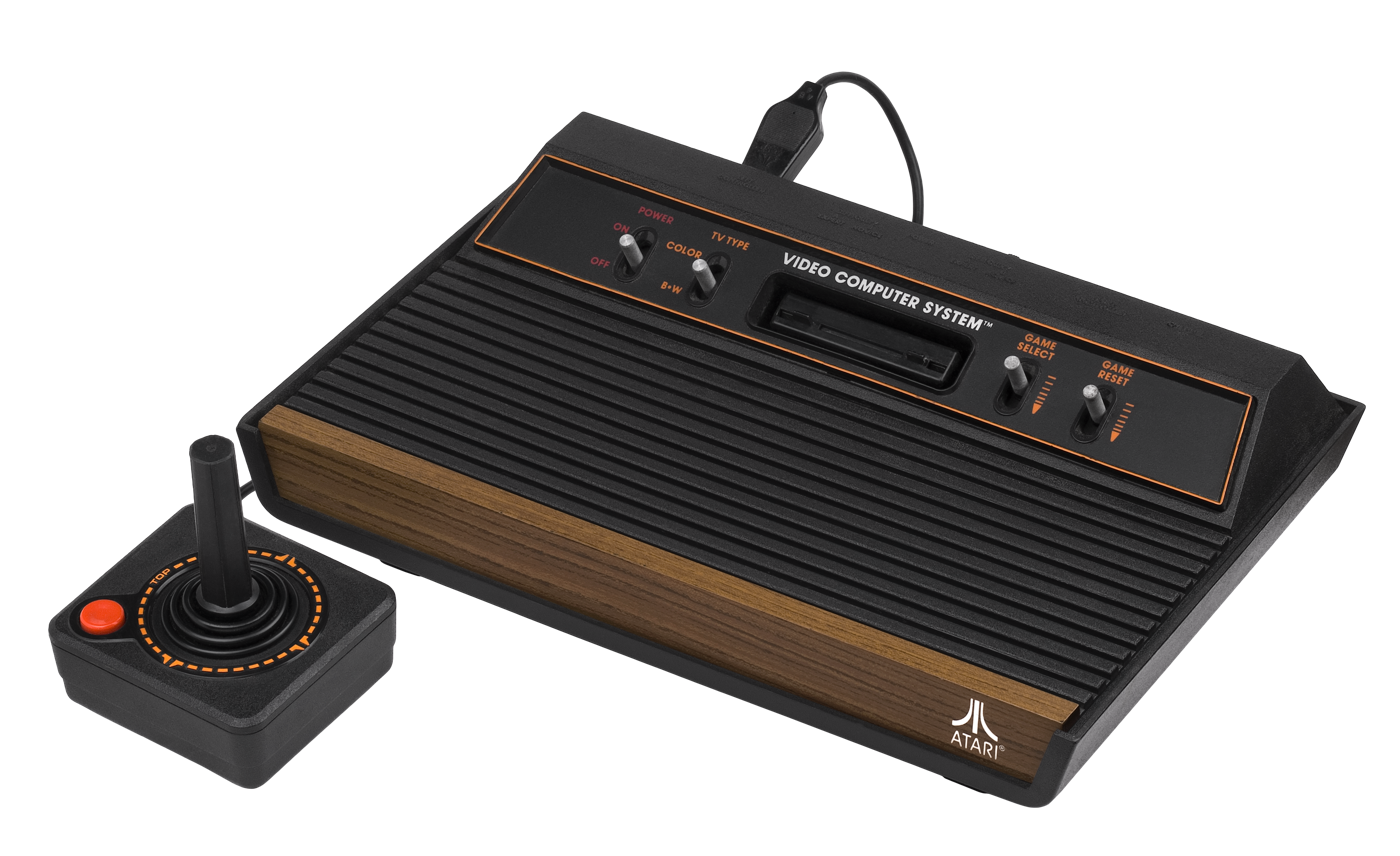
Combat was included with the release of the Atari 2600 (pictured) from 1977 to 1982.

Combat was bundled with most Atari 2600 consoles from 1977 to 1982. The only systems not bundled with the game were those marketed by Sears under its Tele-Games label, which were sold with Air-Sea Battle (1977) under the title Target Fun as the pack-in game. The Sears release of Combat was known as Tank Plus.

According to Weekly Television Digest from October 17, 1977, the Atari VCS was shipped to all major market areas by August 1977. The system became known as the Atari 2600 only after the release of the Atari 5200 in 1982. The cover art of Combat was drawn by Cliff Spohn. Spohn commented he was not happy with the cover, noting that as the graphic was cut up into four areas that the jet trail is cut and it "always really bothered [him]."

Combat was re-released in various compilation formats, such as the Atari 80 in One for Windows in 2003 and the Atari Anthology for PlayStation 2 and Xbox in 2004. It was also released on portable devices as part of Atari Classics Evolved (2007) for the PlayStation Portable and Atari Greatest Hits (2011) for iOS. In 2010, it was made available as part of Microsoft's Game Room for the Xbox 360.

== Reception ==
From contemporary reviews, Video compared the Atari VCS's launch titles, and gave tank pong the highest rating of the variations on Combat with a seven-and-one-half rating for Tank-Pong and Invisible Tank Pong, six-and-one-half for invisible tank game, and six for all the other variations. In comparison, BlackJack and Video Olympics received a ten and eight-and-one-half rating each, while Basic Math, Surround, Street Racer, and Star Ship all received lower ratings. By 1982, the game was receiving negative reception. Walter Lowe, Jr. ranked the game with a one-and-a-half star rating in Playboy's Guide to Rating Video Games while Ken Uston in Buying and Beating the Home Video Games declared "It's not fair to be too critical because, after all, this cartridge is nearly five years old; and in this age of rapid computer technology, that makes it almost an antique." Craig Kubey's The Winners' Book of Video Games simply described it as "adequate" with both Lowe, Jr. and Kubey both only finding the saving grace that it came included with the console. In the British publication TV Gamer from August 1983, Sonya Bradford found the controls took time to get used to and that the game "becomes a bit monotonous, which is not helped by the poor graphics."

From retrospective reviews, Brett Alan Weiss of the online video game database AllGame gave the game a four-and-a-half-star rating out of five, declaring that the simple graphics and sound fail to give a true impression of the game, noting its high replay value and "highly entertaining cat-and-mouse action." In the first issue of Classic Gamer Magazine (1999) D.B. Caufield declared Combat as "still an outstanding two-player game", finding that what it lacked in graphics it made up for in game play.

In 1995, Flux magazine ranked Combat #48 on their list of "Top 100 Video Games". The article stated that despite what the publication described as poor-quality graphics, the game play made Combat earn its position on the list. In 2012, PCMag included Combat in their "The Greatest Atari Games of All Time" list, with writer Eric Griffith noted the dated graphics by 2012 standards, while finding that the game felt "pretty magical in the 70's."

== Legacy ==
A gameplay scene from the prototype release of Combat Two

A sequel to Combat went into development for the Atari 2600 and was to be titled Combat Two. It was announced by Atari in 1982. The game would have included landscape elements such as water, forests and bridges as well as a level editor. The game was officially announced but was never officially released for the system. An incomplete prototype of the game surfaced in 1999 by former Atari Age magazine editor Steve Morgenstern.

Physical copies of the game were made for sale in limited quantity at the 2001 Classic Gaming Expo. The prototype was released as part of the Atari Flashback 2 dedicated console in 2005. Combat Two was included as part of the Atari 50 (2022) compilation for Nintendo Switch, PlayStation 4, Steam, and Xbox One.

== See also ==
- List of Atari 2600 games
