= RealSports Football =

1982 video game

- Atari 2600 box art
- Developer: Atari, Inc.
- Publishers: Atari, Inc.
- Designer: Robert Zdybel
- Programmers: 2600; Robert Zdybel; Atari 8-bit, 5200; Jim Heuther
- Series: RealSports
- Platforms: Atari 2600, Atari 5200, Atari 8-bit
- Release: 2600, 5200: December 1982; Atari 8-bit: 1983
- Genre: Sports (American football)
- Modes: Single-player, multiplayer

RealSports Football is a 1982 American football video game developed and published by Atari, Inc. for the Atari 2600 and Atari 5200. It was later ported to Atari 8-bit computers in 1983. It is part of the RealSports series of games.

RealSports Football presents a simplified version of football for play. Players in the game cannot go out of bounds or fumble the football, and there are no penalties in the game. A touchdown automatically scores 7 points and there is no kicking for extra points.

== Gameplay ==
Yellow's linebacker and the score are not visible because of a flickering effect on the Atari 2600.

Each game is 15 minutes long and is played on a standard 100-yard football field. There are no kickoffs, and each side is given five players. The team on the offensive side of the ball has a quarterback, a flanker, and three offensive linemen (a center and two guards); the user controls the one with the ball. The team on defense has two defensive linemen, two cornerbacks, and one linebacker, which the user controls.

On offense, the user is given these choices for plays: pass left, pass right, run or kick. The game does not recognize a handoff (the usual method of a running play) and has no running back, although the quarterback is allowed to scramble. After the play is selected, the user presses the joystick button to snap the ball and start play. Once the quarterback lets go of the ball on a passing play, user control immediately moves to the receiver. To pass or kick the ball, the user presses the joystick button, and to navigate the field, the user moves the joystick.

In kicking, the game does not differentiate punt from a field goal kick. Also, there are no kick returns — the place where the ball lands on a punt is where the opponent starts to play, unless it enters the end zone or counts as a field goal, in which case play starts on the 20-yard line.

On defense, there are more choices: full-out blitz, left cornerback cover, right cornerback cover, and prevent (both cornerbacks deep). Interceptions are incorporated into the game, but play is called dead when one occurs, and possession is turned over to the interceptor.

Seven points are scored for a touchdown, three for a successful field goal, and two for a safety. After each score, the opposing team gains possession at their own 20-yard line. The scoreboard shows a maximum score of 99 per team, but hitting that limit does not stop the game.

The Novice and Expert switches affect the speed of the players on each side of the ball, as well as receivers' ability to catch a pass if the player is human.

== Development ==
The 2600 version's programming was assigned to Rob Zdybel. Atari asked him that the game should display 22 players at once, but according to Zdybel that was impossible if the players were to move. The 5200 and Atari 8-bit versions were handled by Jim Huether, who wanted to work on a football game since he joined Atari. Development of these versions took about one year. Huether did the design, the programming, the sounds, and even the first draft of the manual himself. He had to demonstrate the game to Steven Spielberg and the senior management of Atari when Spielberg visited Atari.

== Reception ==
RealSports Football received a Certificate of Merit for "1984 Best Sports Videogame" at the 5th annual Arkie Awards.

== Legacy ==
The intellectual property rights for the game passed to Hasbro Interactive and were subsequently bought by Infogrames in 2001, which was subsequently renamed Atari SA. In 2018, the game was re-released by AtGames on their Flashback portable platform.
