= RealSports Volleyball =

1982 video game

- Developer: Atari, Inc.
- Publishers: Atari, Inc.
- Programmers: Bob Polaro; Jim Huether
- Artist: Alan Murphy
- Series: RealSports
- Platform: Atari 2600
- Release: November 1982
- Genre: Sports (volleyball)
- Modes: Single-player, multiplayer

The blue player has just served the ball.

Realsports Volleyball is a volleyball video game written by Bob Polaro and Jim Huether for the Atari 2600 and published by Atari, Inc. in 1982. Polaro also programmed the Atari 2600 port of Defender.

== Development ==
RealSports Volleyball is an enhanced version of programmer Bob Polaro's never released game Volleyball. He asked to make several improvements on it, including better animations and more colourful backgrounds. It is part of the RealSports series of games.

== Reception ==
Steve Davidson gave a favorable review to the game in Arcade Express in 1983, and called it "a triumph" (8/10). The game won The Video Game Update magazine's 1982 Awards of Excellence in the "Best New Sports Game" category.

== Reviews ==
- Games #44

== Legacy ==
The intellectual property rights for the game passed to Hasbro Interactive and were subsequently bought by Infogrames in 2001, which was subsequently renamed Atari SA. It was then re-released for the Atari Flashback 3 in 2011, which was the first console of the Flashback series made by the AtGames company. As of 2021, the game has been included on all subsequent Flashback consoles, including the Flashback 4, 5, 6, 7, 8, 9, and X.
