= Atari Flashback =

Line of dedicated video game consoles

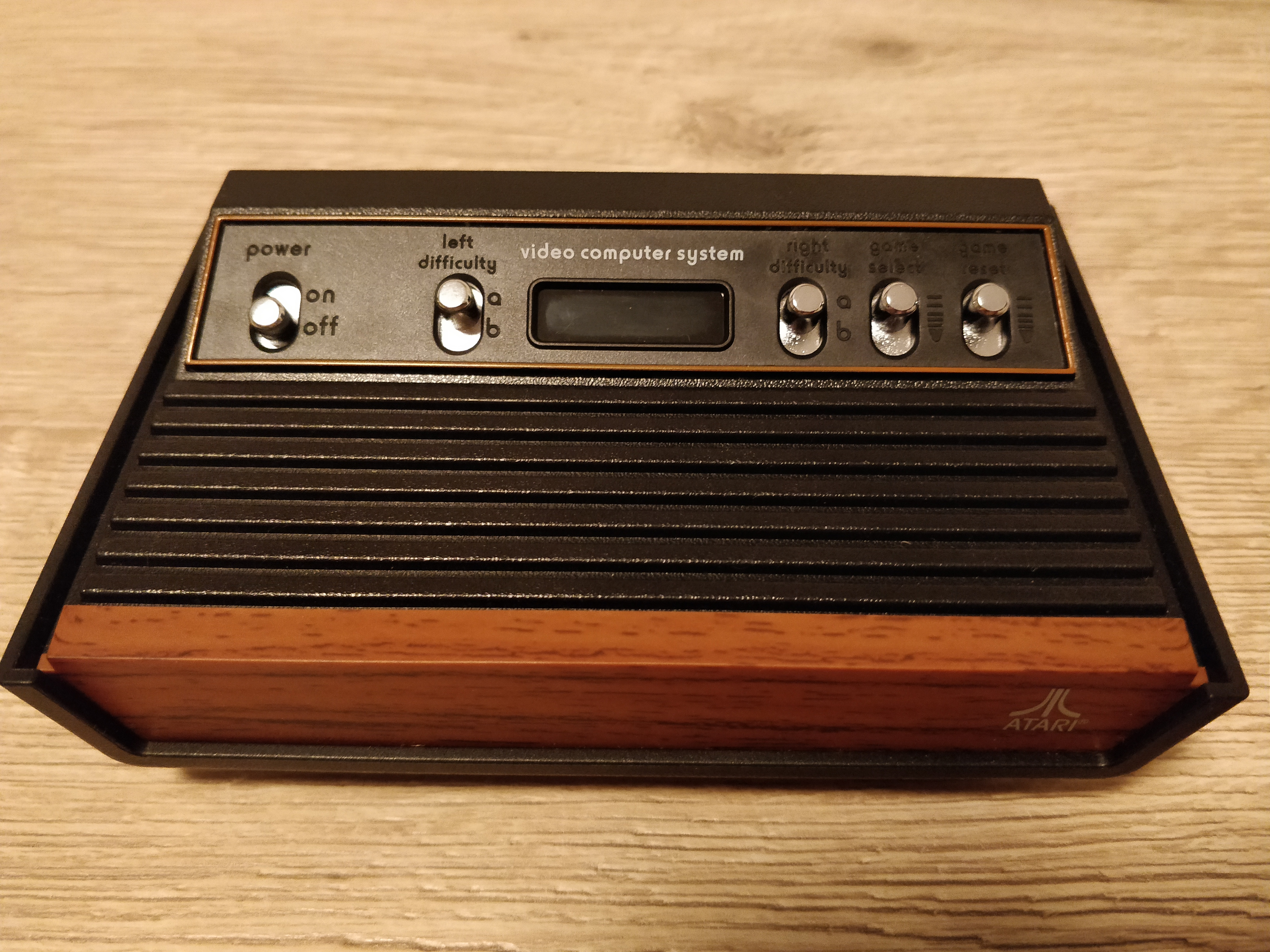
- Flashback X, released in 2019
- Developer: AtGames; Atari, Inc. (until 2011)
- Manufacturer: Legacy Engineering Group (2004–2011); AtGames (2011–present)
- Type: Dedicated console
- Lifespan: 2004–present
- Units sold: 1 million+
- System on a chip: NES-on-a-chip (original Flashback); Atari 2600-on-a-chip (Flashback 2 and 2+)
- Online services: Firmware updates (Flashback 9, 9 Gold, X, X Deluxe, 50th Gold and 12 Gold only)
- Dimensions: 5.7 in × 3.8 in × 1.7 in (14.5 cm × 9.7 cm × 4.3 cm) (Flashback 12 Gold)
- Weight: 1.07 lb (0.49 kg) (Flashback 12 Gold)
- Website: www.atgames.us

The Atari Flashback is a line of dedicated video game consoles produced since 2004, currently designed, produced, published and marketed by AtGames under license from Atari SA. The Flashback consoles are "plug-and-play" versions of the 1970s Atari 2600 console with built-in games rather than using ROM cartridges. The latest home console model, Atari Flashback 12 Gold, was released in 2023 and has 130 games.

The first version, designed by Atari veteran Curt Vendel, was modeled after an Atari 7800 and contained 20 games, of which five were 7800 titles. Each subsequent home console in the series is modeled after the 2600 instead; the Atari Flashback 2 was released in 2005, included 40 built-in games, and was the only one with a 2600 hardware SoC. In 2011, Atari, Inc. stopped producing the Flashback in-house and licensed it to AtGames, who continued from there on beginning with the Flashback 3, including a handheld version, Atari Flashback Portable, in 2016. Several variations of the Flashback 8 were released in 2017, including the Gold edition, which introduces scan line filtering, a gameplay rewind feature, and HDMI output. Since the Flashback X in 2019, the exterior designs have been more faithful near-replicas of the original Atari 2600 in miniature forms.

== Home consoles ==
=== Original console ===
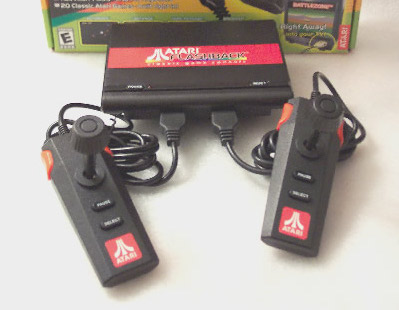
The original Atari Flashback

The original Atari Flashback was released in November 2004, with a retail price of $45. The console resembles a smaller version of the Atari 7800, and its controllers are also smaller versions of the 7800's joystick controllers, but with the addition of "pause" and "select" buttons. The controllers are not compatible with the original 7800 console. It was designed by Atari veteran Curt Vendel and his company Legacy Engineering Group, which designs other home video game and video arcade products.

The console lacks a cartridge slot, making it incompatible with 7800 games. Instead, the console features 20 built-in games, including 15 Atari 2600 games and five 7800 games. Some of the games originally required analog paddle controllers and were made to work with the included joysticks. The Atari Flashback runs on famiclone, rather than Atari hardware. As a result, its games do not match their original counterparts entirely. The game library includes Saboteur, a game that went unreleased for 20 years.

The Flashback sold approximately 500,000 units. Craig Harris of IGN was critical of the game conversions and opined that original copies of these games were superior, writing "it's just horrifying to see Atari, a company that outright owns these games and the original hardware, produce such shoddy renditions of the classic 2600 and 7800 games." Harris complained of problems such as flicker, poor collision detection, and missing sound. He praised the controllers for their reduced size, finding them more comfortable to use, but he was disappointed that they are incompatible with the original 7800.

=== Atari Flashback 2 ===
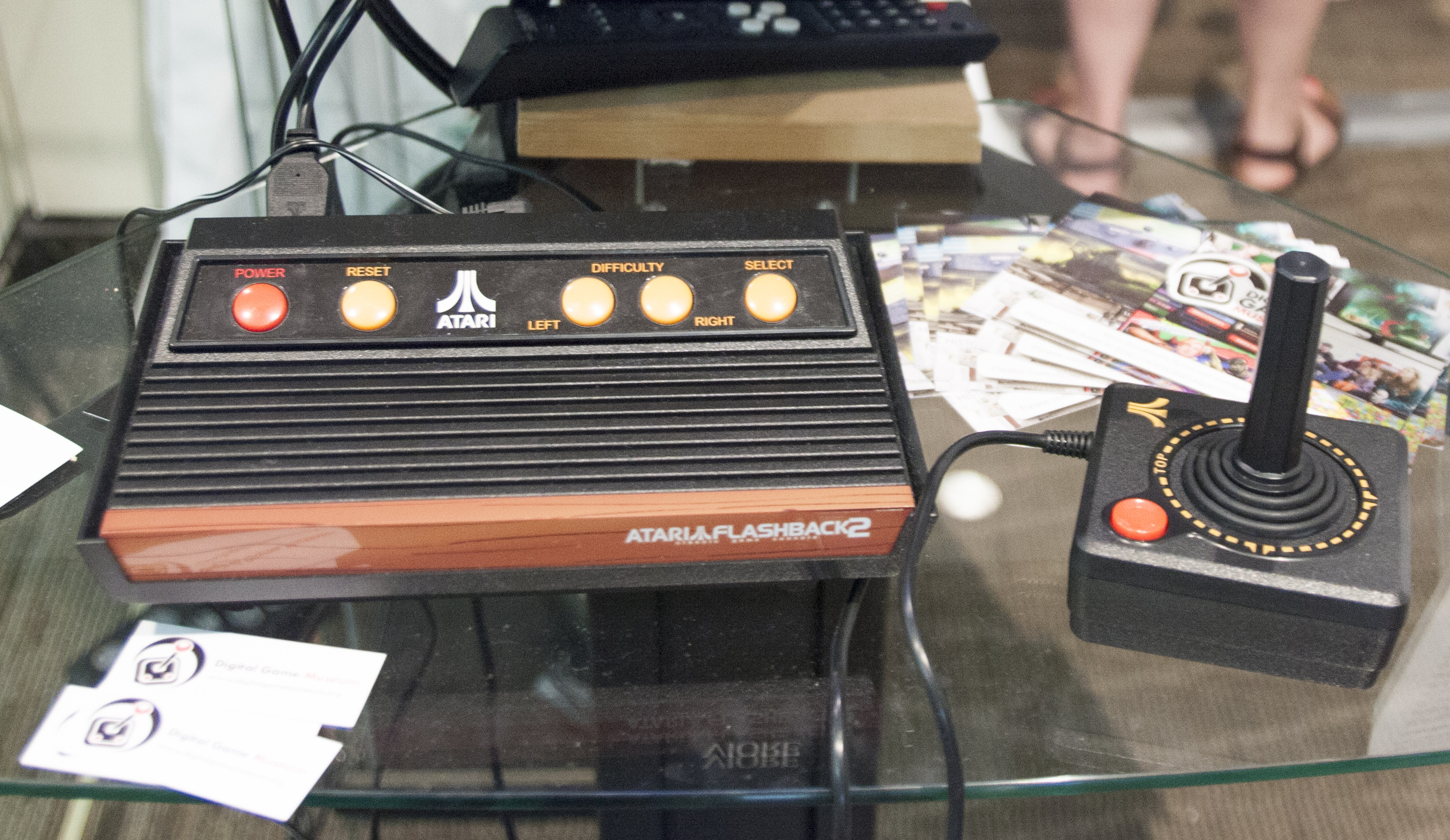
Atari Flashback 2

The Atari Flashback 2 was released in August 2005 as an improved version of its predecessor. It retailed for $30 and included 40 built-in Atari 2600 games. It is a small near-replica of the 2600, about two-thirds the size of the original. Its controllers are also replicas of the 2600 joysticks. The 2600 and Flashback 2 controllers are compatible with both systems.

Instead of switches, the Flashback 2 console has several buttons, some of which are used to adjust power and reset it. A "select" button is used to choose between single-player and multiplayer modes, for certain games that offer the latter. Two other buttons are used to adjust the joystick difficulty for the left and right controller respectively. An AV cord is hardwired into the back of the console. The back also has a switch to toggle games between color and black-and-white.

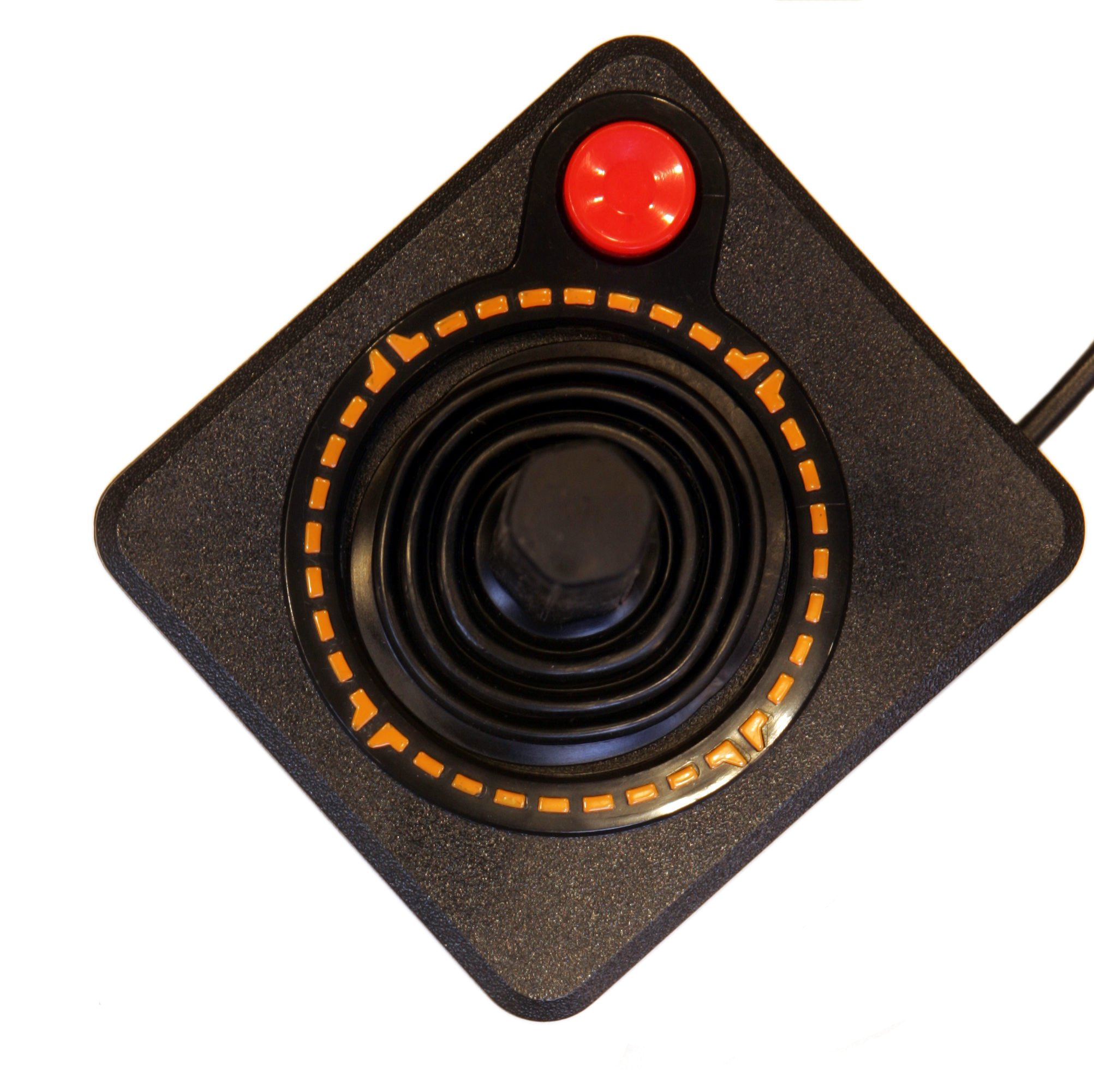
Since the Flashback 2, every home console in the series has used a variant of the original Atari 2600 joystick.

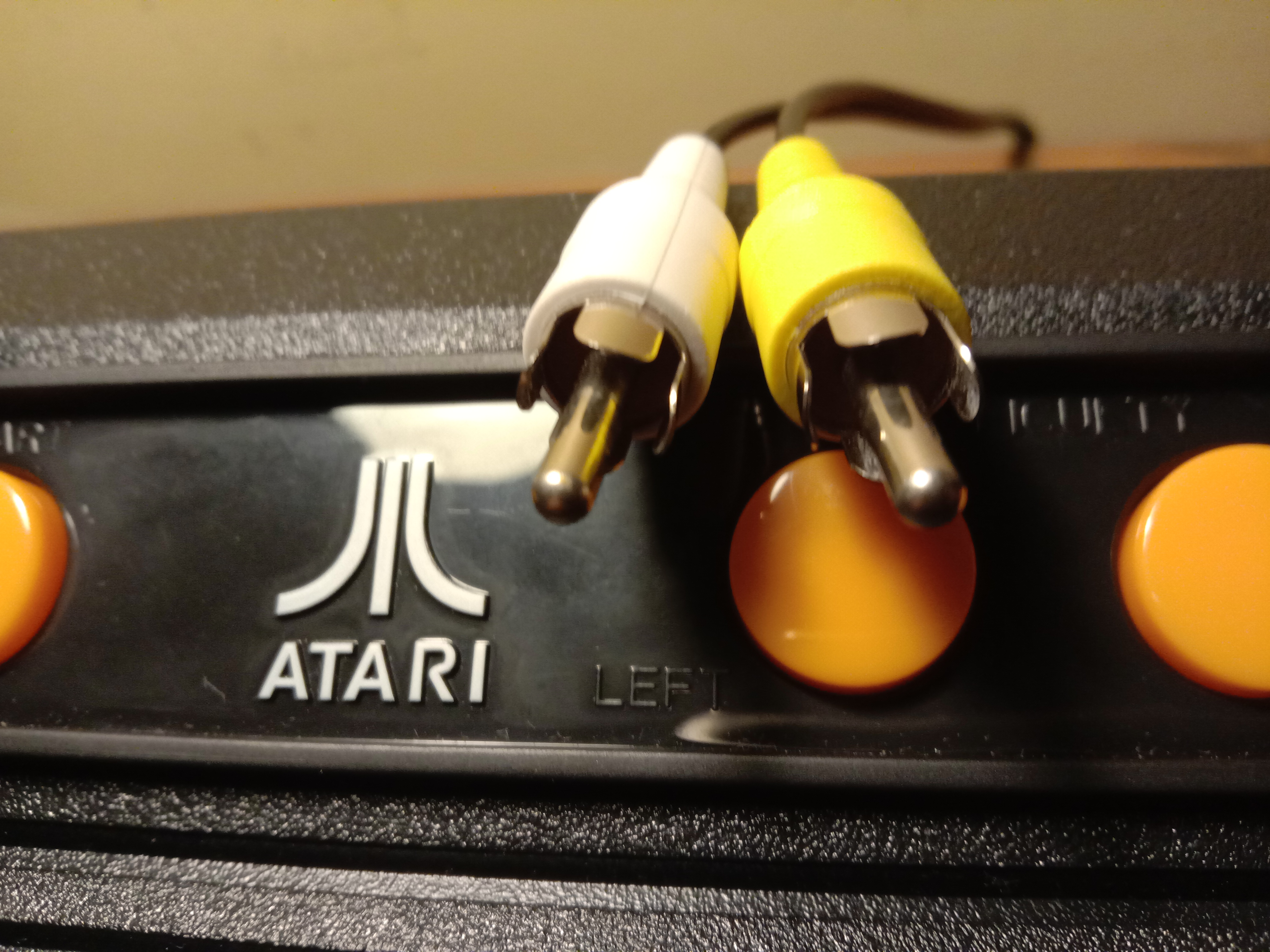
Most Atari Flashback systems use RCA cables for video output.

Vendel and Legacy Engineering returned to develop the Flashback 2. In designing it, Vendel relied on materials from his Atari History Museum. He recreated the original Atari hardware on a single chip, allowing games to run as they originally did. The console's hardware makes it easy to mod. The Flashback 2's motherboard can be altered to accept 2600 cartridges, a concept that the console was designed around.

The Flashback 2 was better received compared to its predecessor. John Falcone of CNET praised the controllers and considered them the best aspect of the console. The Flashback 2 sold 860,000 units in the United States. A PAL version was never released. The console was discontinued in 2006.

In 2011, Atari Interactive filed a $30 million lawsuit against Tommo, accusing the latter of knowingly selling pirated Flashback 2 consoles.

==== Games ====
Aside from the 40 built-in games, the Flashback 2 also contains two secret games (Super Breakout and Warlords), which are accessible through a combination of joystick moves on the console's main menu. Five of the 40 games are prototypes that were previously unreleased. While the original Flashback only includes games published by Atari, the Flashback 2 features two games by Activision: Pitfall! and River Raid. A few of the included games are homebrews.

Some games, such as Lunar Lander, exhibit some flicker. This is due to limitations in the original Atari 2600 hardware, which the Flashback 2 reproduces accurately. Vendel noted that the games exclusive to the Flashback 2 were programmed under a strict schedule. For a revision of the Flashback 2, Vendel commissioned developers to tweak these games in order to reduce flickering.

=== Atari Flashback 2+ ===
In January 2010, Atari announced pre-orders for the Atari Flashback 2+, to be released on February 22, 2010. It included 20 classic Atari 2600 games and 20 new Atari games. The game lineup was mostly the same as the original Flashback 2. However, games such as Pitfall!, River Raid, and Wizard did not appear and were replaced by sports games.

=== Atari Flashback 3 ===
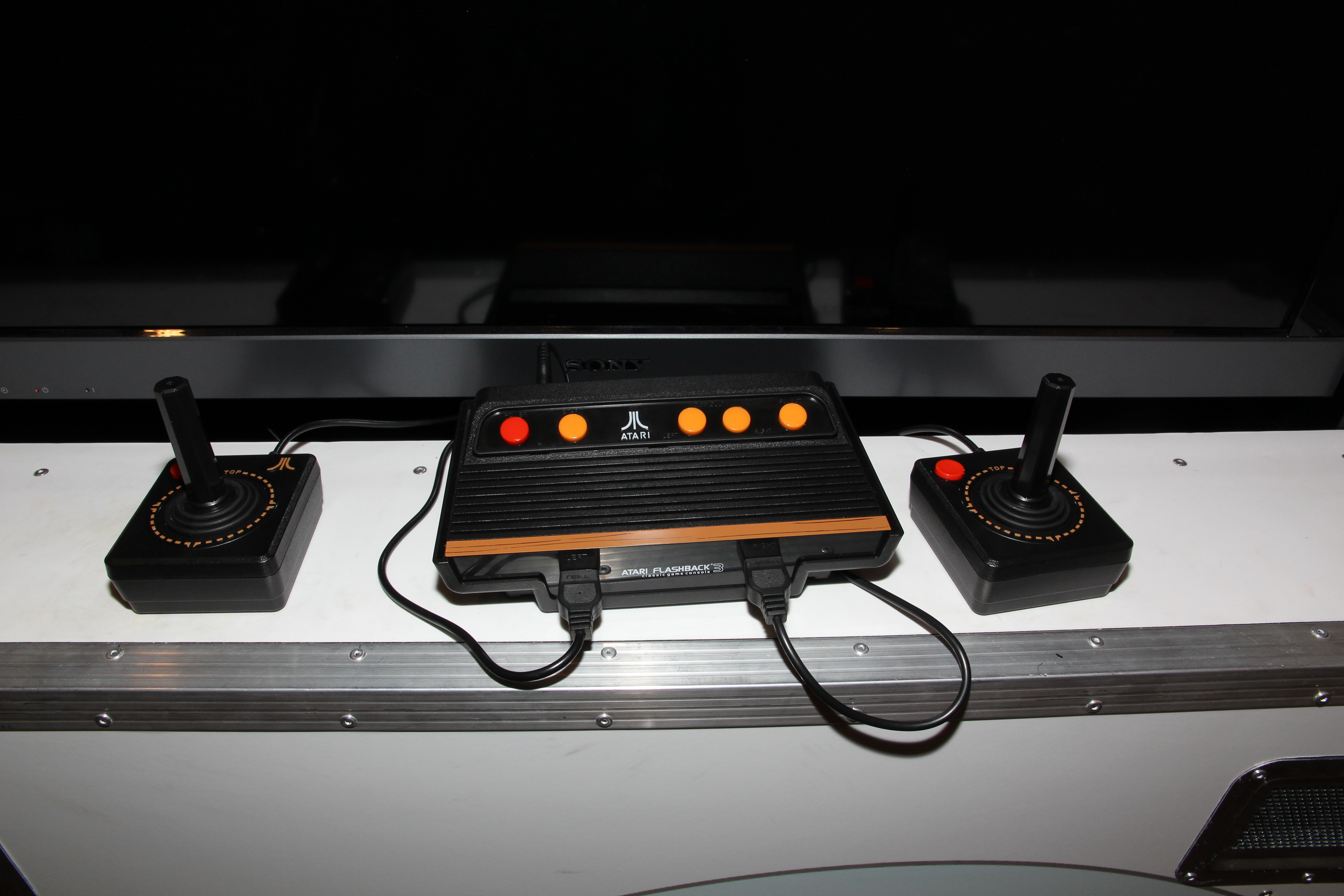
Atari Flashback 3

The Atari Flashback 3 was manufactured by AtGames and was released in September 2011. The Flashback 3 included 60 built-in Atari 2600 games, 2 joysticks, and a case design that was similar to the Flashback 2. Unlike its predecessors, the Flashback 3 used emulation. It could not be modded to play 2600 cartridges.

PCMag opined that some of the games were inferior to their original arcade counterparts.

=== Atari Flashback 4 ===
The Atari Flashback 4 was released by AtGames on November 13, 2012. The console looked similar to its predecessor but included wireless joystick controllers. Like its predecessor, the Flashback 4 used emulation. The console increased its library to 75 games, 15 more than the Flashback 3.

AtGames also released several alternate versions, including the Atari Flashback 4: 40th Anniversary Deluxe Edition. This included a set of replica Atari 2600 paddles, five collectible posters, and a copy of the original Atari joystick patent signed by Nolan Bushnell. AtGames also developed the Atari Flashback 64, a Walmart exclusive version with wired controllers and only 64 games, including Space Invaders. Some versions of the Flashback 4 included a 76th "bonus" game, Millipede.

=== Atari Flashback 5 ===
The Atari Flashback 5 was released on October 1, 2014. Like the previous two releases, it was built by AtGames. It was the same as the Flashback 4, with infrared wireless joysticks, but it added 17 more games, increasing the total to 92 games.

=== Atari Flashback 6 ===
The Atari Flashback 6 was released on September 15, 2015. Like the previous three releases, it was built by AtGames. It was the same as the Flashback 5, with infrared wireless joysticks, but it added 8 more games, increasing the total to 100 games.

=== Atari Flashback 7 ===
The Atari Flashback 7 was released on October 1, 2016. Like the previous four releases, it was built by AtGames. It is the same as the Flashback 6 with the infrared wireless joysticks, but it adds one more game - Frogger - increasing the total to 101 games.

The Atari Flashback 7 Deluxe includes two wired paddle controllers in addition to the wireless joysticks.

=== Atari Flashback 8 ===
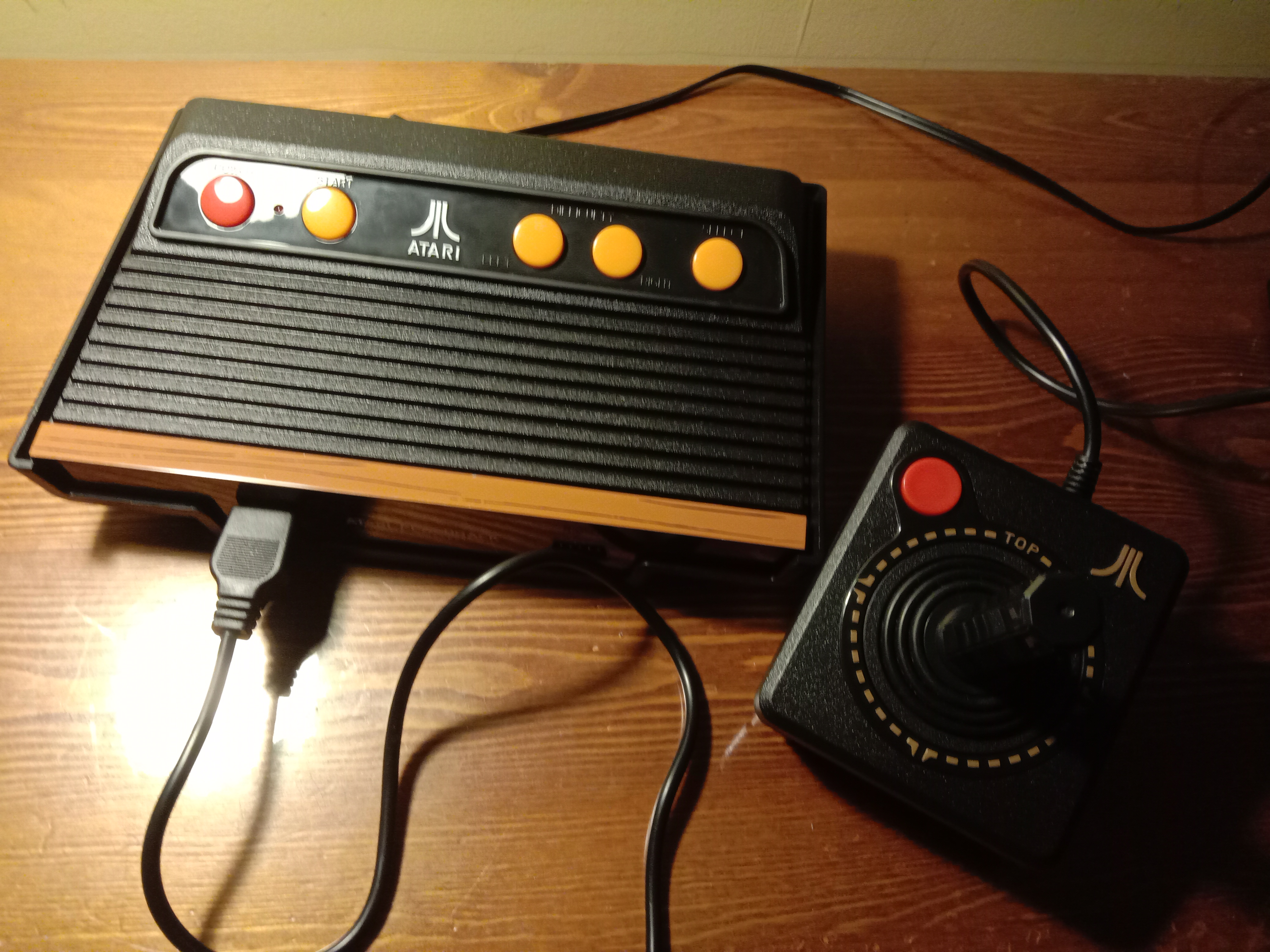
Flashback 8 with joystick, released in 2017

The Atari Flashback 8 was released in September 2017 by AtGames. Several variations were released. A basic model, the Flashback 8 Classic, featured 105 games and two wired controllers. The Flashback 8 Deluxe was identical, except that it included a set of paddle controllers in addition to the joysticks.

The Flashback 8 Gold had 120 games and wireless controllers as well as ports for 2600 controllers. The Gold edition had "save" and "pause" features as well as scan line filtering. It also allowed the player to rewind gameplay by several seconds. In addition, it introduced HDMI output for 720p.

The Atari Flashback 8 Gold Deluxe also had 120 games, but included two wired paddles in addition to two wireless joysticks. The Flashback 8 Gold Activision Edition had 130 games, including several by Activision, although the other versions also featured some Activision games. All the games were emulated.

=== Atari Flashback 9 ===
The Atari Flashback 9 (Model No: AR3050) was released on November 15, 2018, by AtGames. It included two wired controllers and 110 games.

The Atari Flashback 9 Gold (Model No: AR3650) included 120 games and wireless controllers. Both versions featured an SD card slot and an output of 720p. The SD slot on both basic and gold models was used for firmware updates, downloaded games, and saved game states.

The Atari Flashback 9 (Model No: AR3230) was a Family Dollar exclusive. It included two wired controllers and 110 games, and it featured composite video output along with an SD slot.

=== Atari Flashback X ===
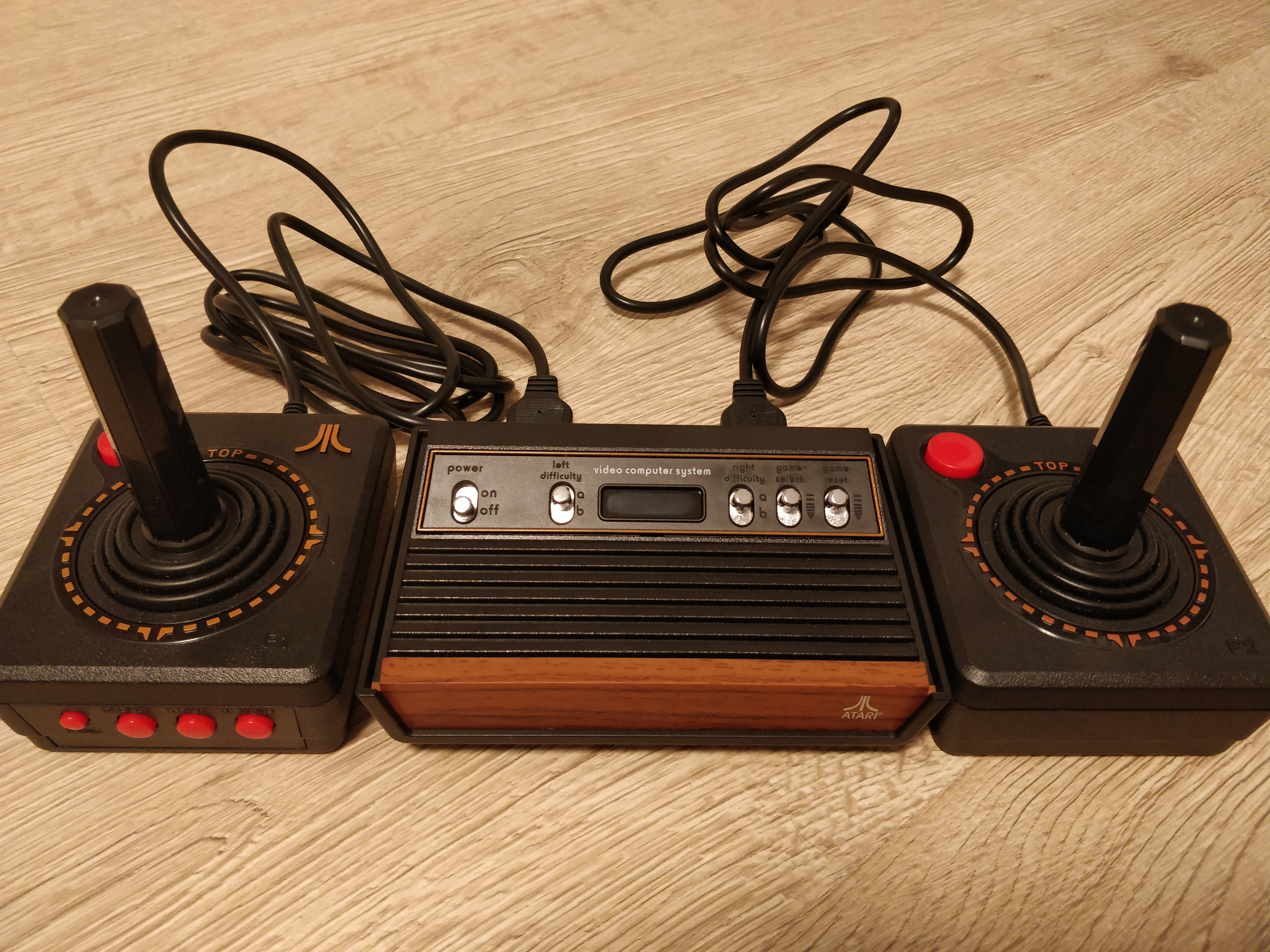
Atari Flashback X Deluxe

The Atari Flashback X was released in 2019 and attempted to capitalize on the mini console trend, started by releases like the NES Classic Edition and Sega Genesis Mini, with a case redesign that more faithfully captured the aesthetic of being a near-perfect physical replica of an Atari 2600 in miniature form. Like the previous releases, it was built by AtGames.

The basic model (Model No: AR3060) included two wired controllers and 110 games. The deluxe model (Model No: AR3060S) included 10 additional games. A firmware update through the AtGames website allowed both models to download more games.

=== Atari Flashback 50th Anniversary Edition ===
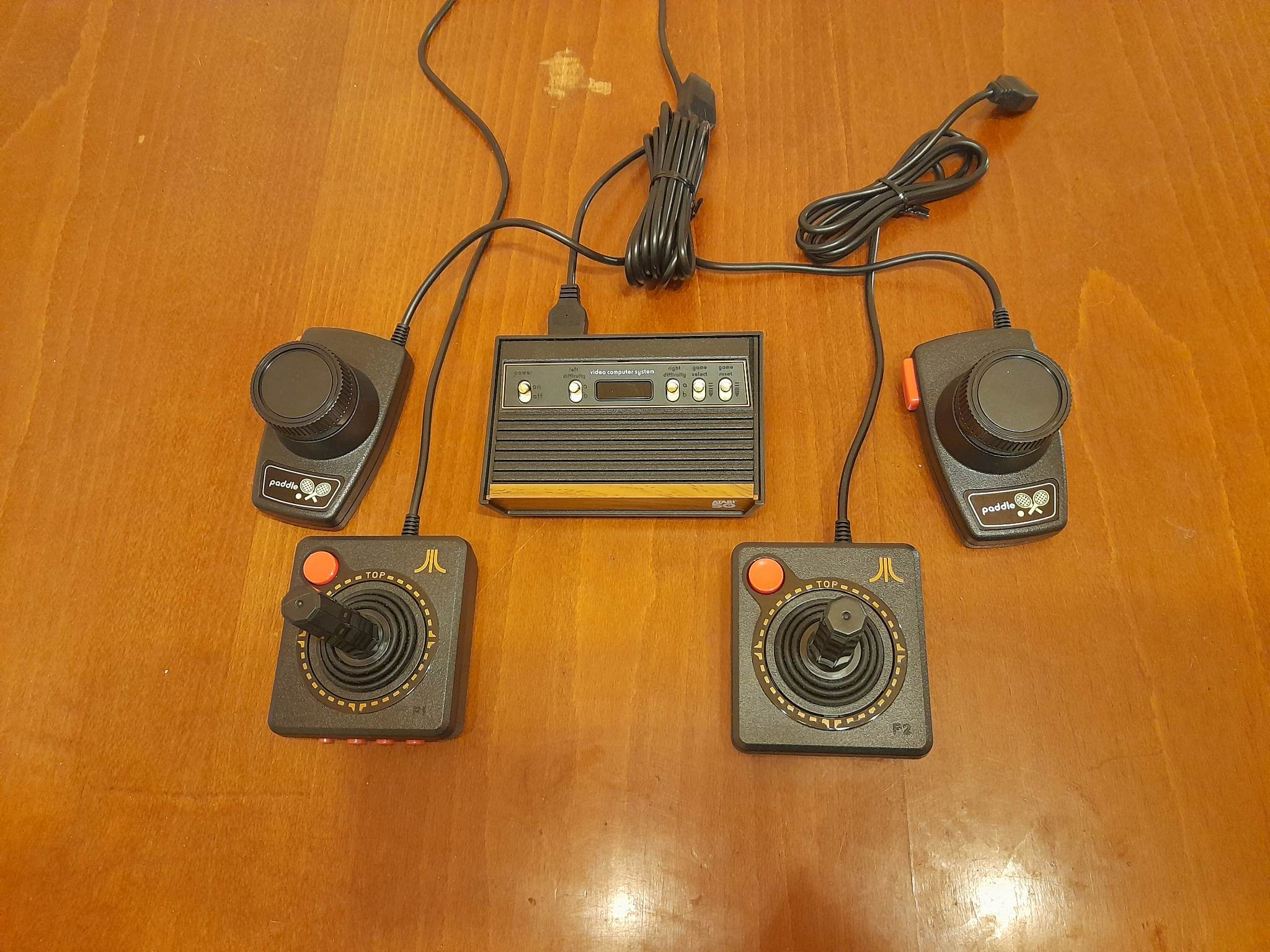
Atari Flashback 50th Anniversary Edition

The Atari Flashback 50th Anniversary Edition saw a limited release in 2022. Physically it was a slight re-coloration of the Atari Flashback X. It featured brass switches instead of chrome, and it had the gold "Atari 50th" logo stamped onto its wood-veneer trim. Like the previous releases, it was built by AtGames.

The basic model (Model No: AR3070) included two wired standard controllers and 110 games. The gold model (Model No: AR3080) included two wired standard controllers, two wired paddle controllers, and 130 games. Only the gold model supported official firmware updates from the AtGames website to allow more games to be downloaded.

=== Atari Flashback 12 Gold ===
The Atari Flashback 12 Gold (Model No: AR3080B) was given a limited release in 2023. Although it features Gold in its title, like past Atari Flashback releases, there is no basic model of the Flashback 12. Physically it is a slight re-coloration of the Atari Flashback X and Atari Flashback 50th Anniversary Edition that amalgamates the two prior aesthetics. It features brass switches, as seen on the Atari Flashback 50th Anniversary Edition, but the standard silver Atari logo is stamped onto its wood-veneer trim as seen on the Atari Flashback X. Like the previous releases, it was built by AtGames. The model includes two wired standard controllers, two wired paddle controllers, and 130 games. The list of 130 games included is identical to the Atari Flashback 50th Anniversary Edition Gold model. The Atari Flashback 12 Gold features support for official firmware updates from the AtGames website to allow for the download of more games.

=== Games by Flashback version ===
Games	Originally by	Flashback	Flashback 2	Flashback 2+	Flashback 3	Flashback 4	Flashback 5	Flashback 6 and 7 (Note: The Flashback 7 includes Frogger as an additional game over its predecessor)	Flashback 8	Flashback 8 Gold	Flashback 8 Gold Activision	Flashback 9	Flashback 9 Gold	Flashback X	Flashback X Deluxe	Flashback 50th	Flashback 50th Gold and 12 Gold
Games	Originally by	2004	2005	2010	2011	2012	2014	2015/2016	2017	2017	2017	2018	2018	2019	2019	2022	2022/2023
3D Tic-Tac-Toe	Atari		Yes	Yes	Yes	Yes	Yes	Yes	Yes	Yes	Yes	Yes	Yes	Yes	Yes	Yes	Yes
Adventure	Atari	Yes	Yes	Yes	Yes	Yes	Yes	Yes	Yes	Yes	Yes	Yes	Yes	Yes	Yes	Yes	Yes
Adventure II	Homebrew		Yes	Yes	Yes	Yes	Yes	Yes	Yes	Yes	Yes	Yes	Yes	Yes	Yes	Yes	Yes
Air Raiders	M Network						Yes	Yes	Yes	Yes	Yes						
Air-Sea Battle	Atari	Yes			Yes	Yes	Yes	Yes	Yes	Yes	Yes	Yes	Yes	Yes	Yes	Yes	Yes
Amidar	Parker Brothers											Yes	Yes	Yes	Yes		
Aquaventure (Note: A previously unreleased prototype.)	Prototype		Yes	Yes	Yes	Yes	Yes	Yes	Yes	Yes	Yes	Yes	Yes	Yes	Yes	Yes	Yes
Armor Ambush	M Network						Yes	Yes	Yes	Yes	Yes						
Asteroids	Atari	Yes (Note: Atari 7800 version)			Yes	Yes	Yes	Yes	Yes	Yes	Yes	Yes	Yes	Yes	Yes	Yes	Yes
Asteroids Deluxe	Homebrew		Yes	Yes								Yes	Yes	Yes	Yes	Yes	Yes
Astroblast	M Network						Yes	Yes	Yes	Yes	Yes						
Atari Climber (Note: A homebrew title by Dennis Debro also called Climber 5)	Homebrew		Yes					Yes	Yes	Yes	Yes	Yes	Yes	Yes	Yes	Yes	Yes
Atari Video Cube	Atari												Yes				
Atlantis	Imagic										Yes						
Backgammon	Atari				Yes	Yes	Yes	Yes	Yes	Yes	Yes	Yes	Yes		Yes	Yes	Yes
Barnstorming	Activision																Yes
Basketball	Atari				Yes	Yes	Yes	Yes	Yes	Yes	Yes	Yes	Yes	Yes	Yes	Yes	Yes
Battlezone	Atari	Yes	Yes	Yes	Yes	Yes											
Beamrider	Activision									Yes	Yes	Yes	Yes	Yes	Yes	Yes	Yes
Blackjack	Atari					Yes	Yes	Yes	Yes	Yes	Yes	Yes	Yes	Yes	Yes	Yes	Yes
Bowling	Atari				Yes	Yes	Yes	Yes	Yes	Yes	Yes	Yes	Yes	Yes	Yes	Yes	Yes
Boxing	Activision										Yes						Yes
Breakout	Atari	Yes				Yes	Yes	Yes	Yes	Yes	Yes	Yes	Yes	Yes	Yes	Yes	Yes
Bridge	Activision										Yes						Yes
BurgerTime	M Network												Yes	Yes	Yes	Yes	Yes
Burnin' Rubber	M Network												Yes	Yes	Yes	Yes	Yes
Canyon Bomber	Atari	Yes			Yes	Yes	Yes	Yes	Yes	Yes	Yes	Yes	Yes	Yes	Yes	Yes	Yes
Caverns of Mars (Note: Originally a Atari 8-bit game ported for Flashback.)	Homebrew		Yes														
Centipede	Atari	Yes	Yes	Yes	Yes	Yes	Yes	Yes	Yes	Yes	Yes	Yes	Yes	Yes	Yes	Yes	Yes
Championship Soccer	Atari				Yes	Yes	Yes	Yes	Yes	Yes	Yes	Yes	Yes	Yes	Yes	Yes	Yes
Chase It! (Note: A homebrew game written by Alan W. Smith.)	Homebrew						Yes	Yes	Yes	Yes			Yes		Yes		
Checkers	Activision										Yes						
Charley Chuck's Food Fight	Atari	Yes (Note: An Atari 7800 game)															
Chopper Command	Activision									Yes	Yes	Yes	Yes	Yes	Yes	Yes	Yes
Circus Atari	Atari			Yes (Note: As a hidden game)	Yes	Yes	Yes	Yes	Yes	Yes	Yes	Yes	Yes	Yes	Yes	Yes	Yes
Combat	Atari		Yes	Yes	Yes	Yes	Yes	Yes	Yes	Yes	Yes	Yes	Yes	Yes	Yes	Yes	Yes
Combat 2	Prototype		Yes	Yes	Yes	Yes	Yes	Yes	Yes	Yes	Yes	Yes	Yes	Yes	Yes	Yes	Yes
Cosmic Commuter	Activision									Yes	Yes	Yes	Yes	Yes	Yes	Yes	Yes
Crackpots	Activision									Yes	Yes	Yes	Yes	Yes	Yes	Yes	Yes
Crystal Castles	Atari	Yes				Yes	Yes	Yes	Yes	Yes	Yes	Yes	Yes	Yes	Yes	Yes	Yes
Dark Cavern	M Network						Yes	Yes	Yes	Yes	Yes						
Decathlon	Activision									Yes	Yes	Yes	Yes	Yes	Yes	Yes	Yes
Demon Attack	Imagic										Yes						Yes
Demons to Diamonds	Atari				Yes	Yes	Yes	Yes	Yes	Yes	Yes	Yes	Yes	Yes	Yes	Yes	Yes
Desert Falcon	Atari	Yes			Yes	Yes	Yes	Yes	Yes	Yes	Yes	Yes	Yes	Yes	Yes	Yes	Yes
Dodge 'Em	Atari		Yes	Yes	Yes	Yes	Yes	Yes	Yes	Yes	Yes	Yes	Yes	Yes	Yes	Yes	Yes
Dolphin	Activision										Yes						Yes
Double Dunk	Atari			Yes	Yes	Yes	Yes	Yes	Yes	Yes	Yes	Yes	Yes	Yes	Yes	Yes	Yes
Dragonfire	Imagic										Yes						Yes
Dragster	Activision									Yes	Yes	Yes	Yes	Yes	Yes	Yes	Yes
Enduro	Activision									Yes	Yes	Yes	Yes	Yes	Yes	Yes	Yes
Escape It!	Homebrew						Yes	Yes	Yes	Yes			Yes		Yes		
Fatal Run	Atari		Yes	Yes	Yes	Yes	Yes	Yes	Yes	Yes	Yes	Yes	Yes	Yes	Yes	Yes	Yes
Fishing Derby	Activision									Yes	Yes	Yes		Yes	Yes	Yes	Yes
Flag Capture	Atari				Yes	Yes	Yes	Yes	Yes	Yes	Yes	Yes	Yes	Yes	Yes	Yes	Yes
Football	Atari					Yes	Yes	Yes	Yes	Yes	Yes	Yes	Yes	Yes	Yes	Yes	Yes
Freeway	Activision										Yes		Yes				Yes
Frog Pond	Prototype		Yes	Yes	Yes	Yes	Yes	Yes	Yes	Yes	Yes	Yes	Yes		Yes	Yes	Yes
Frogger (Note: Custom port made exclusively for the Flashback)	Homebrew							Yes	Yes	Yes		Yes	Yes	Yes	Yes		
Frogs and Flies	M Network						Yes	Yes	Yes	Yes	Yes						
Front Line	Coleco					Yes	Yes	Yes	Yes	Yes		Yes	Yes	Yes	Yes	Yes	Yes
Frostbite	Activision									Yes	Yes	Yes	Yes	Yes	Yes	Yes	Yes
Fun With Numbers	Atari				Yes	Yes	Yes	Yes	Yes	Yes	Yes	Yes	Yes		Yes	Yes	Yes
Golf	Atari				Yes	Yes	Yes	Yes	Yes	Yes	Yes	Yes	Yes	Yes	Yes	Yes	Yes
Grand Prix	Activision										Yes						Yes
Gravitar	Atari	Yes			Yes	Yes	Yes	Yes	Yes	Yes	Yes	Yes	Yes	Yes	Yes	Yes	Yes
Gyruss	Parker Brothers											Yes	Yes	Yes	Yes		
H.E.R.O.	Activision								Yes	Yes	Yes	Yes	Yes	Yes	Yes	Yes	Yes
Hangman	Atari		Yes	Yes	Yes	Yes	Yes	Yes	Yes	Yes	Yes	Yes	Yes	Yes	Yes	Yes	Yes
Haunted House	Atari	Yes	Yes	Yes	Yes	Yes	Yes	Yes	Yes	Yes	Yes	Yes	Yes	Yes	Yes	Yes	Yes
Home Run	Atari				Yes	Yes	Yes	Yes	Yes	Yes	Yes	Yes	Yes	Yes	Yes	Yes	Yes
Human Cannonball	Atari		Yes	Yes	Yes	Yes	Yes	Yes	Yes	Yes	Yes	Yes	Yes	Yes	Yes	Yes	Yes
Ice Hockey	Activision										Yes						Yes
Indy 500	Atari							Yes	Yes	Yes	Yes	Yes	Yes	Yes	Yes	Yes	Yes
International Soccer	M Network						Yes	Yes	Yes	Yes	Yes						
Jungle Hunt	Atari					Yes	Yes	Yes	Yes	Yes		Yes	Yes	Yes	Yes	Yes	Yes
Kaboom!	Activision								Yes	Yes	Yes	Yes	Yes	Yes	Yes	Yes	Yes
Keystone Kapers	Activision									Yes	Yes	Yes	Yes	Yes	Yes	Yes	Yes
Laser Blast	Activision										Yes						Yes
Lock 'n' Chase	M Network												Yes	Yes	Yes	Yes	Yes
Lunar Lander	Homebrew		Yes	Yes													
Marine Wars	Konami														Yes		
Maze Craze	Atari		Yes	Yes	Yes	Yes	Yes	Yes	Yes	Yes	Yes	Yes	Yes	Yes	Yes	Yes	Yes
Megamania	Activision									Yes	Yes	Yes	Yes	Yes	Yes	Yes	Yes
Millipede	Atari	Yes	Yes	Yes		Yes (Note: Included in some versions of the Flashback 4)	Yes	Yes	Yes	Yes	Yes	Yes	Yes	Yes	Yes	Yes	Yes
Miniature Golf	Atari				Yes	Yes	Yes	Yes	Yes	Yes	Yes	Yes	Yes	Yes	Yes	Yes	Yes
Miss It!	Homebrew						Yes	Yes	Yes	Yes			Yes		Yes		
Missile Command	Atari		Yes	Yes	Yes	Yes	Yes	Yes	Yes	Yes	Yes	Yes	Yes	Yes	Yes	Yes	Yes
Moonsweeper	Imagic																Yes
MotoRodeo	Atari							Yes	Yes	Yes	Yes	Yes	Yes	Yes	Yes	Yes	Yes
Night Driver	Atari				Yes	Yes	Yes	Yes	Yes	Yes	Yes	Yes	Yes	Yes	Yes	Yes	Yes
Off the Wall	Atari		Yes	Yes	Yes	Yes	Yes	Yes	Yes	Yes	Yes	Yes	Yes	Yes	Yes	Yes	Yes
Oink!	Activision									Yes	Yes	Yes		Yes	Yes	Yes	Yes
Outlaw	Atari		Yes	Yes	Yes	Yes	Yes	Yes	Yes	Yes	Yes	Yes	Yes	Yes	Yes	Yes	Yes
Pitfall!	Activision		Yes						Yes	Yes	Yes	Yes	Yes	Yes	Yes	Yes	Yes
Pitfall II: Lost Caverns	Activision												Yes				Yes
Planet Smashers	Atari	Yes															
Plaque Attack	Activision										Yes						Yes
Polaris	Tigervision					Yes	Yes	Yes	Yes	Yes		Yes	Yes	Yes	Yes	Yes	Yes
Pong	Homebrew		Yes	Yes													
Pong - Video Olympics	Atari					Yes	Yes	Yes	Yes	Yes	Yes	Yes	Yes	Yes	Yes	Yes	Yes
Pooyan	Konami											Yes	Yes	Yes	Yes		
Pressure Cooker	Activision								Yes	Yes	Yes	Yes	Yes	Yes	Yes	Yes	Yes
Private Eye	Activision										Yes						Yes
Quadrun	Atari		Yes	Yes													
Radar Lock	Atari		Yes	Yes				Yes	Yes	Yes	Yes	Yes	Yes	Yes	Yes	Yes	Yes
RealSports Baseball	Atari				Yes	Yes	Yes	Yes	Yes	Yes	Yes	Yes	Yes	Yes	Yes	Yes	Yes
RealSports Basketball	Prototype				Yes	Yes	Yes	Yes	Yes	Yes	Yes	Yes	Yes	Yes	Yes	Yes	Yes
RealSports Boxing	Atari			Yes												Yes	Yes
RealSports Football	Atari															Yes	Yes
RealSports Soccer	Atari			Yes	Yes	Yes	Yes	Yes	Yes	Yes	Yes	Yes	Yes	Yes	Yes	Yes	Yes
RealSports Volleyball	Atari				Yes	Yes	Yes	Yes	Yes	Yes	Yes	Yes	Yes	Yes	Yes	Yes	Yes
Return to Haunted House (Note: A homebrew game developed by Anthony Wong.)	Homebrew		Yes	Yes		Yes	Yes	Yes	Yes	Yes	Yes	Yes	Yes	Yes	Yes	Yes	Yes
River Raid	Activision		Yes						Yes	Yes	Yes	Yes	Yes	Yes	Yes	Yes	Yes
River Raid II	Activision										Yes						Yes
Robot Tank	Activision																Yes
Saboteur	Prototype	Yes	Yes	Yes	Yes	Yes	Yes	Yes	Yes	Yes	Yes	Yes	Yes	Yes	Yes	Yes	Yes
Save Mary	Prototype		Yes	Yes	Yes	Yes	Yes	Yes	Yes	Yes	Yes	Yes	Yes	Yes	Yes	Yes	Yes
Sea Battle	Prototype						Yes	Yes	Yes	Yes	Yes						
Seaquest	Activision									Yes	Yes	Yes	Yes	Yes	Yes	Yes	Yes
Secret Quest	Atari		Yes	Yes	Yes			Yes	Yes	Yes	Yes	Yes	Yes	Yes	Yes	Yes	Yes
Shield Shifter (Note: A homebrew game by John Reder.)	Homebrew						Yes	Yes	Yes	Yes			Yes		Yes		
Skiing	Activision										Yes						Yes
Sky Diver	Atari	Yes			Yes	Yes	Yes	Yes	Yes	Yes	Yes	Yes	Yes	Yes	Yes	Yes	Yes
Sky Jinks	Activision										Yes						Yes
Slot Machine	Atari					Yes	Yes	Yes	Yes	Yes	Yes	Yes	Yes		Yes	Yes	Yes
Slot Racers	Atari					Yes	Yes	Yes	Yes	Yes	Yes	Yes	Yes	Yes	Yes	Yes	Yes
Solaris	Atari	Yes						Yes	Yes	Yes	Yes	Yes	Yes	Yes	Yes	Yes	Yes
Space Attack	M Network						Yes	Yes	Yes	Yes	Yes						
Space Duel	Homebrew		Yes	Yes													
Space Invaders	Atari					Yes	Yes	Yes	Yes	Yes		Yes	Yes	Yes	Yes	Yes	Yes
Space Raid (Note: A homebrew game by Óscar Toledo Gutiérrez.)	Homebrew												Yes	Yes	Yes	Yes	Yes
Space Shuttle: A Journey into Space	Activision										Yes						
Space War	Atari		Yes	Yes	Yes	Yes	Yes	Yes	Yes	Yes	Yes	Yes	Yes	Yes	Yes	Yes	Yes
Spider Fighter	Activision										Yes						Yes
Sprintmaster	Atari	Yes			Yes	Yes	Yes	Yes	Yes	Yes	Yes	Yes	Yes	Yes	Yes	Yes	Yes
Stampede	Activision									Yes	Yes	Yes	Yes	Yes	Yes	Yes	Yes
Star Ship	Atari				Yes	Yes	Yes	Yes	Yes	Yes	Yes	Yes	Yes	Yes	Yes	Yes	Yes
Star Strike	M Network						Yes	Yes	Yes	Yes	Yes						
Starmaster	Activision									Yes	Yes	Yes	Yes	Yes	Yes	Yes	Yes
Steeplechase	Activision				Yes	Yes	Yes	Yes	Yes	Yes	Yes	Yes	Yes	Yes	Yes	Yes	Yes
Stellar Track	Atari					Yes	Yes	Yes	Yes	Yes	Yes	Yes	Yes	Yes	Yes	Yes	Yes
Strategy X	Konami														Yes		
Street Racer	Atari					Yes	Yes	Yes	Yes	Yes	Yes	Yes	Yes	Yes	Yes	Yes	Yes
Strip Off (Note: A homebrew game by John Reder.)	Homebrew						Yes	Yes					Yes				
Submarine Commander	Atari				Yes	Yes	Yes	Yes	Yes	Yes	Yes	Yes	Yes	Yes	Yes	Yes	Yes
Super Baseball	Atari			Yes	Yes	Yes	Yes	Yes	Yes	Yes	Yes	Yes	Yes	Yes	Yes	Yes	Yes
Super Breakout	Atari		Yes	Yes	Yes	Yes	Yes	Yes	Yes	Yes	Yes	Yes	Yes	Yes	Yes	Yes	Yes
Super Challenge Baseball	M Network						Yes	Yes	Yes	Yes	Yes						
Super Challenge Football	M Network						Yes	Yes	Yes	Yes	Yes						
Super Cobra	Parker Brothers													Yes	Yes		
Super Football	Atari			Yes	Yes	Yes	Yes	Yes	Yes	Yes	Yes	Yes	Yes	Yes	Yes	Yes	Yes
Surround	Atari				Yes	Yes	Yes	Yes	Yes	Yes	Yes	Yes	Yes	Yes	Yes	Yes	Yes
Sword Fight	Prototype						Yes	Yes	Yes	Yes	Yes						
Swordquest: Earthworld	Atari				Yes	Yes	Yes	Yes	Yes	Yes	Yes	Yes	Yes	Yes	Yes	Yes	Yes
Swordquest: Fireworld	Atari				Yes	Yes	Yes	Yes	Yes	Yes	Yes	Yes	Yes	Yes	Yes	Yes	Yes
Swordquest: Waterworld	Atari							Yes	Yes	Yes	Yes	Yes	Yes	Yes	Yes	Yes	Yes
Tempest	Prototype					Yes	Yes	Yes	Yes	Yes	Yes	Yes	Yes	Yes	Yes	Yes	Yes
Tennis	Activision										Yes						Yes
Track & Field	Atari											Yes	Yes				
Tutankham	Parker Brothers											Yes	Yes	Yes	Yes		
Video Checkers	Atari		Yes	Yes	Yes	Yes	Yes	Yes	Yes	Yes	Yes	Yes	Yes	Yes	Yes	Yes	Yes
Video Chess	Atari		Yes	Yes	Yes	Yes	Yes	Yes	Yes	Yes	Yes	Yes	Yes	Yes	Yes	Yes	Yes
Video Pinball	Atari				Yes	Yes	Yes	Yes	Yes	Yes	Yes	Yes	Yes	Yes	Yes	Yes	Yes
Warlords	Atari	Yes	Yes	Yes		Yes	Yes	Yes	Yes	Yes	Yes	Yes	Yes	Yes	Yes	Yes	Yes
Wizard	Prototype		Yes		Yes	Yes	Yes	Yes	Yes	Yes	Yes	Yes	Yes	Yes	Yes	Yes	Yes
Yars' Return	Homebrew		Yes	Yes				Yes	Yes	Yes	Yes	Yes	Yes	Yes	Yes	Yes	Yes
Yars' Revenge	Atari	Yes	Yes	Yes	Yes	Yes	Yes	Yes	Yes	Yes	Yes	Yes	Yes	Yes	Yes	Yes	Yes

== Handheld consoles ==
=== Atari Flashback Portable ===
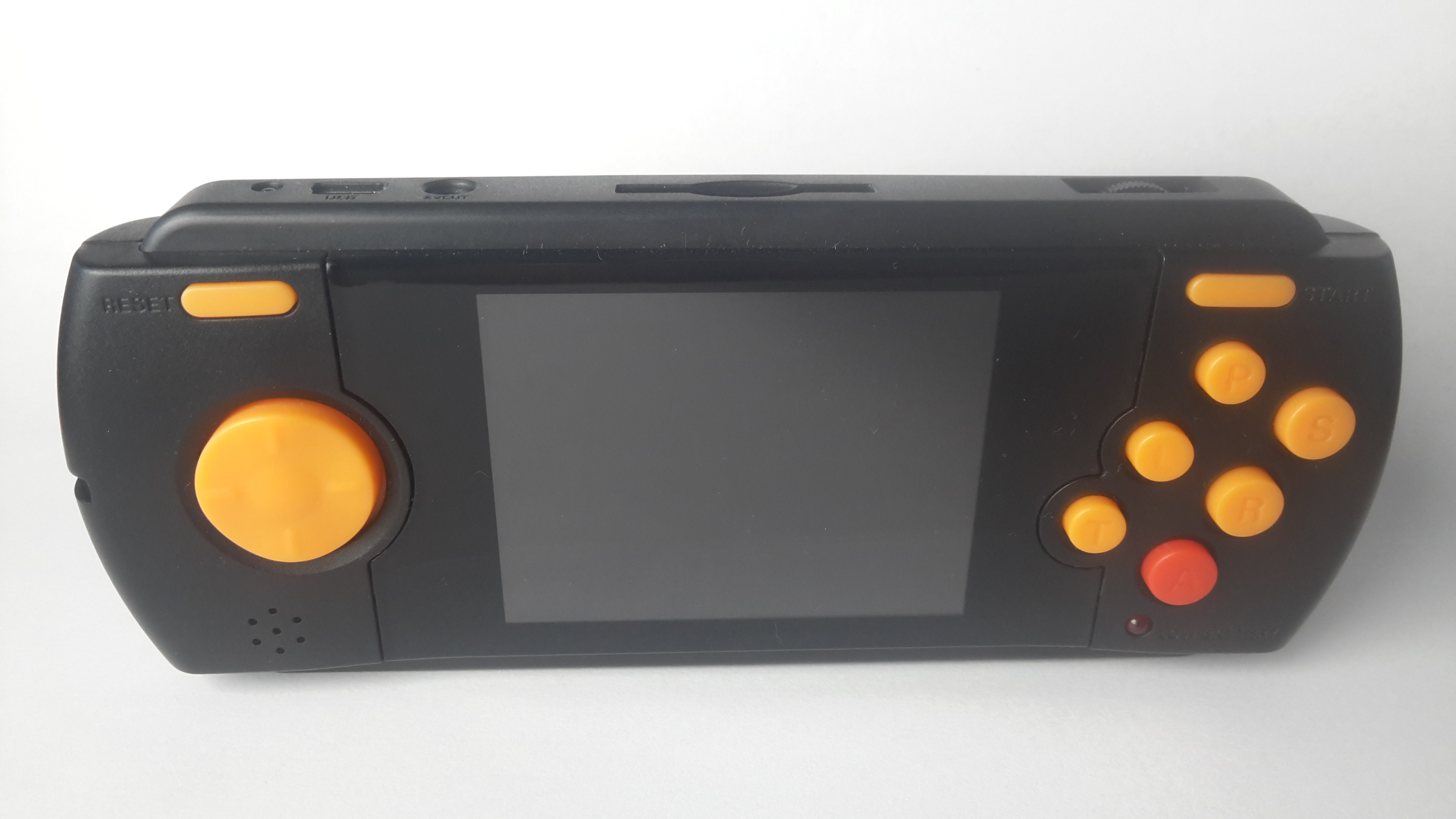
The 2016 Flashback Portable

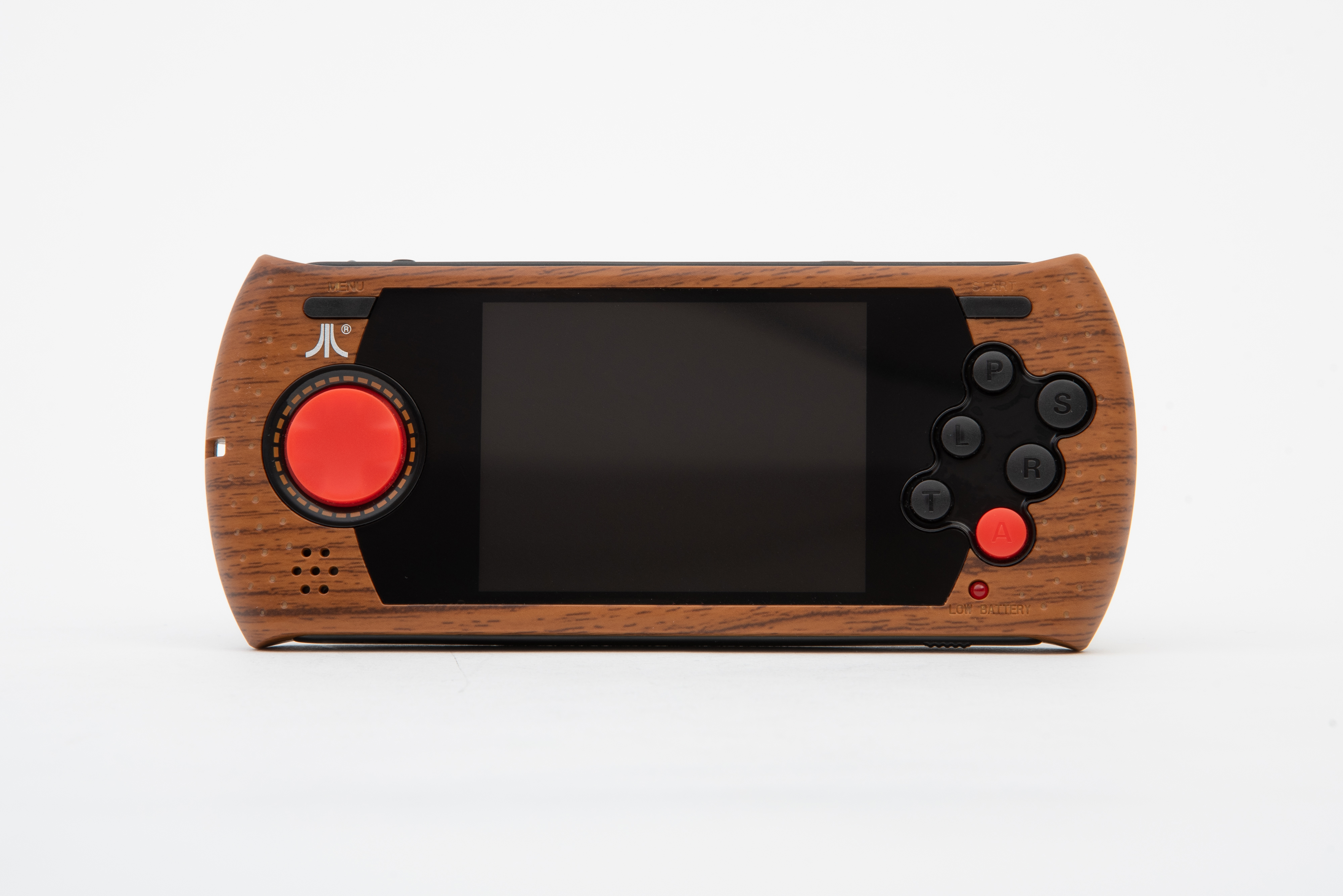
The 2019 Flashback Portable

In 2007, Vendel was working on a handheld console known as the Atari Flashback Portable. It was being designed to run on three "AAA" batteries, at a screen resolution of 320x240, and it would feature AV output with two joystick controller ports for multiplayer. Games are loaded into internal 2MB memory by use of a USB cable. The release date was projected as early 2008 with a retail price of approximately $40. However, Vendel announced in 2010 that the project was not going to be released by Atari and no further information was released.

A new handheld console, also called the Atari Flashback Portable, was released in November 2016. It contains 60 games built in and an SD slot for downloaded games. It has a 3.2" LCD, AV output port and mini USB charge port.

A second edition of Atari Flashback Portable was released in September 2017. Like the first Atari Flashback Portable, it was built by AtGames. It includes 70 games with the most notable additions to this edition being four Namco games which are Dig Dug, Galaxian, Pac-Man, and Xevious. The version of Pac-Man included is a homebrew version that is more faithful to the original arcade game and not the original Atari 2600 version of Pac-Man released in 1982.

A third edition of the Atari Flashback Portable was released by AtGames in September 2018. The standard edition includes 80 games.

A fourth edition of the Atari Flashback Portable was released by AtGames in September 2019. It features a woodgrain-like body design that mirrors the woodgrain look on the original Atari 2600 console. The standard edition includes 80 games.

The second (2017) edition of the Flashback Portable includes the following games:

- Adventure
- Adventure II
- Air Raiders
- Aquaventure
- Asteroids
- Astroblast
- Atari Climber
- Barnstorming
- Black Jack
- Bowling
- Breakout
- Centipede
- Chase It!
- Circus Atari
- Crystal Castles
- Dark Cavern
- Demons to Diamonds
- Desert Falcon
- Dig Dug
- Dodge 'Em
- Double Dunk
- Fatal Run
- Frog Pond
- Frogger
- Frogs and Flies
- Fun with Numbers
- Galaxian
- Golf
- Gravitar
- Hangman
- Haunted House
- Human Cannonball
- Kaboom!
- Millipede
- Miniature Golf
- Miss It!
- Missile Command
- Night Driver
- Pac-Man
- Pitfall!
- Pong
- Pressure Cooker
- Radar Lock
- RealSports Basketball
- Return to Haunted House
- River Raid
- Saboteur
- Save Mary
- Secret Quest
- Shield Shifter
- Slot Machine
- Solaris
- Space Attack
- Star Ship
- Star Strike
- Stellar Track
- Strip Off
- Submarine Commander
- Super Breakout
- Swordquest: Earthworld
- Swordquest: Fireworld
- Swordquest: Waterworld
- Tempest
- Video Checkers
- Video Chess
- Video Pinball
- Wizard
- Xevious
- Yars' Return
- Yars' Revenge

The third (2018) edition includes the following games:

- 3-D Tic-Tac-Toe
- Adventure
- Adventure II
- Amidar
- Aquaventure
- Asteroids
- Asteroids Deluxe
- Atari Climber
- Basketball
- Black Jack
- Bowling
- Breakout
- Centipede
- Chase It!
- Circus Atari
- Crystal Castles
- Demons to Diamonds
- Desert Falcon
- Dig Dug
- Dodge 'Em
- Double Dunk
- Escape It!
- Fatal Run
- Frogs and Flies
- Frogger
- Fun with Numbers
- Galaxian
- Golf
- Gravitar
- Gyruss
- Hangman
- Haunted House
- H.E.R.O.
- Human Cannonball
- Kaboom!
- Millipede
- Miniature Golf
- Miss It!
- Missile Command
- MotoRodeo
- Night Driver
- Off the Wall
- Pac-Man
- Pitfall!
- Pooyan
- Pressure Cooker
- Radar Lock
- RealSports Baseball
- RealSports Boxing
- RealSports Football
- RealSports Tennis
- Return to Haunted House
- River Raid
- Saboteur
- Save Mary
- Secret Quest
- Shield Shifter
- Slot Machine
- Solaris
- Space Raid
- Sprintmaster
- Star Ship
- Stellar Track
- Strip Off
- Submarine Commander
- Super Breakout
- Swordquest: Earthworld
- Swordquest: Fireworld
- Swordquest: Waterworld
- Tempest
- Track & Field
- Tutankham
- Video Checkers
- Video Chess
- Video Pinball
- Video Olympics (Pong)
- Wizard
- Xevious
- Yars' Return
- Yars' Revenge

The fourth (2019) edition includes the same games as the third (2018) edition but with Atari's unreleased prototype game Frog Pond replacing Frogs and Flies.

== Other products ==
Atari Flashback Classics is a compilation of various Atari video games. It is the console release of Atari Vault and its DLC on Microsoft Windows, MacOS and Linux. The compilation was first released in 2016, for PlayStation 4 and Xbox One, split into three volumes. Then, it was released for Nintendo Switch and PlayStation Vita in 2018, and finally on Atari VCS in 2020 as Atari VCS Vault, split into two volumes.

In October 2018, AtGames released Atari Flashback Blast!, a trio of wireless controllers each with 20 built-in games.

== See also ==
- List of retro style video game consoles
