= Save Mary =

- Cover art for Atari 2600 release
- Publisher: Atari
- Designer: Tod Frye
- Platforms: Atari Flashback, Atari 2600
- Release: August 2005
- Mode: Single-player

Save Mary is a prototype video game designed by Tod Frye and made for the Atari 2600. The game involves Mary who is trapped in a valley that is slowly filling with water. The player must operate a crane to move blocks to allow Mary to escape the rising water and eventually be carried to safety by the player.

Frye had years of experience working for various companies including Atari where he made the Atari 2600 port of Pac-Man (1982). Following the video game crash of 1983, he continued to develop games for the system at companies like Epyx and in 1989 at Axlon where he began developing Save Mary. The game was never released as the company began focusing on making games for the Atari Lynx.

Prototypes of Save Mary were later discovered and released as bootlegs cartridges and online. The game had an official release in 2005, being included on the Atari Flashback 2 dedicated console. The game had since been released in various Atari compilations, and was announced for its own unique Atari 2600 cartridge in 2023.

== Gameplay ==
Gameplay of Save Mary. The player maneuvers the crane at the top of the screen in order to move blocks for Mary to climb so she can reach the hook. The player must be careful where they place the blocks.

Barnaby Black has placed Mary at the bottom of a steep canyon which is slowly filling with water. The player controls a crane to pick up various blocks that must be fit together to allow Mary to climb them to escape the rising water levels. Mary panics and moves back and forth climbing platforms near her. To progress, the player must move the crane left and right along its rails and lower the crane's hook and pick up objects such as bricks for Mary to traverse on, items to assist the player, and to pick up and rescue Mary herself.

Items can be found that cause various effects for the player, ranging from controlling the water flow, moving the crane faster, stopping Mary from moving across the board and making her invulnerable to the bricks the player drops.

== Development ==
Save Mary was made by Tod Frye. Frye had a long history with Atari, joining the company in 1979 where he made the 1982 port of Pac-Man for the Atari 2600. Following the release of the high-selling but poorly received game, Frye earned over $1.3 million in royalties but found most of his money had been depleted by 1985.

Upon Jack Tramiel's acquisition of the Atari consumer division and launch of the Atari ST computer line, Tramiel began focusing on reviving the Atari 2600, hiring Michael Katz from Epyx in November 1985 to take on the role of the president of Atari's new Entertainment Electronics Division. Frye had been working for Epyx porting computer games such as Summer Games to the Atari 2600 and then found himself next working for Nolan Bushnell's firm Axlon in 1989. While at Axlon, Frye worked on games like Shooting Gallery and Save Mary. These titles went unreleased as development on games had then shifted to the new system, the Atari Lynx.

== Release ==
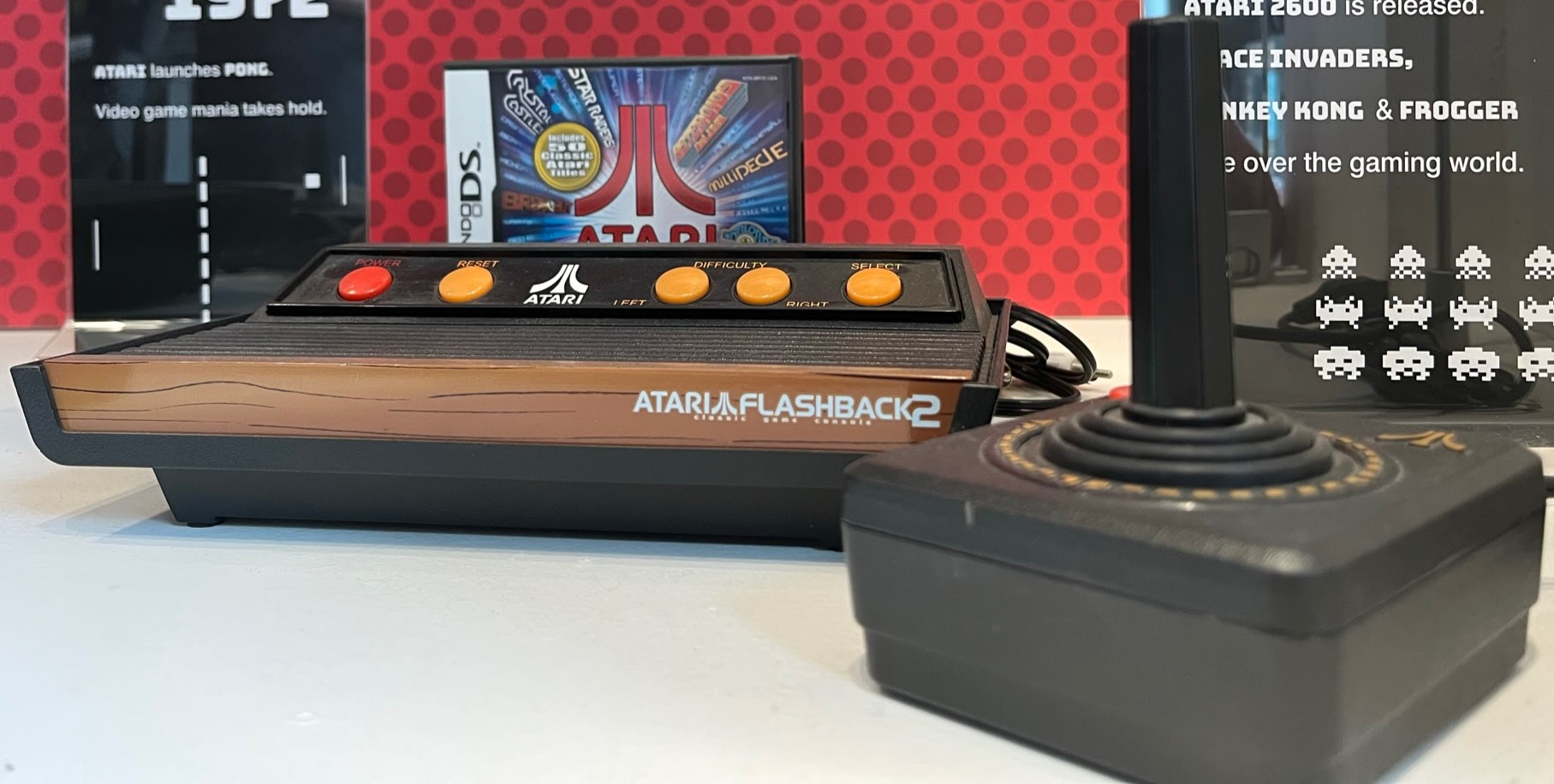
Save Mary had its first official release in 2005 when it was included on the Atari Flashback 2.

Save Mary was one of eight prototype games cartridges that were discovered and made available onto the internet. Homebrew cartridges would later be sold unofficially using the prototype ROM.

It was first officially published in the Atari Flashback 2 dedicated console in August 2005. It was released alongside other unreleased prototypes for the Atari 2600 such as Aquaventure, Combat Two, Frog Pond and Wizard. The Flashback 2 was discontinued in 2006, having sold over 860 thousand units. The game was released in later Atari compilations such as Atari Flashback Classics Volume 1 (2018) and being added to the Atari 50 (2022) compilation in a free update in 2023.

In 2023, Atari announced a limited edition cartridge of Save Mary for the Atari 2600. The item was sold out by October 2023.

== Reception ==
Since its official release, the game has received positive reviews from publications such as Video Game Collector, NintendoLife, and Destructoid. Matt Reichert of Video Game Collector magazine stated in 2008 that Save Mary was an interesting Tetris-variant and that "Atari had a real winner on its hands." Ollie Reynolds of NintendoLife commented on the game in the Atari 50 2023 update release, stating that the title was a slow, methodical game, but immensely fun. Zoey Handley of Destructoid stated that the game was a "pretty fantastic" Atari 2600 title.
