= Aquaventure (video game) =

2005 video game

- Developer: Atari, Inc.
- Publishers: Atari, Inc.
- Programmer: Gary Shannon
- Platform: Atari 2600
- Release: 2005
- Genre: Action
- Mode: Single-player

Aquaventure is an action video game developed and published by Atari, Inc. for the Atari 2600. It was developed in 1983 but was not released until its inclusion on the Atari Flashback 2 in 2005. The developer's identity was unknown until 2022 when Gary Shannon confirmed that he wrote the game's code, although he was not the game's lead designer. In Aquaventure, the player controls a diver to evade aquatic creatures and reach the treasure at the bottom of each level before running out of air.

== History ==
Aquaventure was programmed by Gary Shannon in August 1983 for the Atari 2600, but it was not released and was not included on Atari's internal list of finished and unfinished projects. The prototype was reportedly discovered in the mid-1990s on a cartridge sold at a flea market in central Florida. The game was shared among collectors after its discovery, and three more prototype copies were found in the early 2000s.

Aquaventure saw its first official release on the Atari Flashback 2 in 2005. Atari released Aquaventure as one of the three debut cartridges in its Atari XP series, along with Saboteur and Yars' Return. As the Atari XP series was being launched, Atari and Atari Protos author Matt Reichert worked to identify the true developer. Reichert put out a public request for information through Atari's official blog. Atari had at first erroneously attributed the game to Saboteur developer Howard Scott Warshaw. Tod Frye was also incorrectly described as the developer because he created a freely-licensed kernal used in Aquaventure. Gary Shannon was credited as the game's developer on Atari Protos, which he disputed in January 2022. The following month, Shannon said that he recalled writing the code for the game but was not involved in its conception or design; he recalled completing the game without knowledge of its cancellation.

== Gameplay ==
Gameplay of Aquaventure

The player controls a diver with a speargun. In each level, the diver goes into the water and navigates past hostile aquatic animals to find the treasure at the bottom of the ocean. The game takes place at the shipwreck of the fictional pirate Calico Blue. A mermaid waits at the top of the level to receive the treasure. Levels are timed, based on an air supply meter.

== Reception ==
Nick Thrope of Retro Gamer gave Aquaventure a positive review, describing it as "simple but pretty compelling".
