= Armor Battle =

1979 video game

- Developer: Mattel Electronics
- Publisher: Mattel Electronics
- Designer: Chris Kingsley
- Platform: Intellivision
- Release: November 1979
- Genre: Multidirectional shooter
- Mode: Multiplayer

Armor Battle is a multidirectional shooter video game written by Chris Kingsley for the Intellivision and published by Mattel in 1979. One of the earliest games available for the console, Armor Battle pits two players against each other in a contest to see which player can eliminate their opponent's stock of tanks first. The game was also later released on the Atari 2600 in 1982 under the name Armor Ambush.

== Gameplay ==
The object of Armor Battle is to be the first to destroy all opposing tanks. The game takes place on one of 240 randomly selected battlefields, each with a different configuration of structural and environmental obstacles. Each player commands a pair of tanks, with one active and one in reserve, located randomly on the battlefield. Players maneuver their tanks one at a time around the battlefield in order to target opposing tanks while simultaneously evading enemy fire.

Each battlefield has its own set of features that players can use to their benefit. Buildings cannot be destroyed, nor can they be crossed by the tanks, thus providing cover for the players. Tanks travel slowly through forests, but they do provide some cover, even from shots fired at close range. Rivers and lakes can be crossed, but only very slowly and with no cover for the tank. Similarly, roads leave tanks exposed to fire, but they may travel rapidly upon them.

Active tanks can be pointed in any direction, and may move forward as long as their path is not blocked by an obstacle. Tanks may fire a single shot at a time in the direction in which the tank is facing. Players may switch control between their tanks at any time, but reserve tanks are just as vulnerable to enemy fire as active tanks. Each player may also lay a single mine during the game. Mines are invisible to the players, and become live five seconds after being deployed. Once deployed, mines cannot be destroyed by tank fire and will detonate on contact with any tank.

A tank is destroyed by three direct hits from an opponent's tanks or upon collision with a mine. If a player has a reserve tank available, control automatically switches to the reserve tank upon destruction of the active tank. The game ends when one player loses both of their tanks. After the scoreboard appears, players may launch a new map and play again, with the game keeping track of total wins/losses until the software is reset by the player or until one player loses a total of 50 tanks.

== Ports ==
Armor Battle was released under the same name by Sears for its private-label version of the Intellivision console, the "Super Video Arcade". In 1982, Mattel's M Network brand produced a port named Armor Ambush for the Atari 2600.

== Reception and legacy ==
Armor Battle was reviewed favorably by Video magazine in its "Arcade Alley" column where it was praised for its excitingness compared to other tank games. The varied battlefield terrains were singled out for specific praise, and the reviewers suggested that "Armor Battle opens stunning strategic vistas for video wargamers" and that the game "must be played to be believed".

In 1998, Armor Ambush was re-released as part of the Intellivision Lives! compilation.

== See also ==
- Combat (Atari 2600 game)
