= Kool-Aid Man =

Fictional character and mascot for Kool-Aid

- Kool-Aid character
- Kool-Aid Man's appearance since 2000
- First appearance: July 10, 1954 (early version); July 26, 1974 (official version)
- Created by: Michael Craig Sr.
- Voiced by: Richard Berg (1974–1994); Frank Simms (1999–2009); Pat Duke (2009–2013); Keith Hudson (2014); Scott Golden (2014–2016); Brock Powell (2016–2019); Matt Howell (2020–present)

In-universe information
- Aliases: Pitcher Man; Captain Kool-Aid (in Canada); Frankie D. Kool-Aid
- Gender: Male
- Title: Mascot of Kool-Aid

The Kool-Aid Man (sometimes referred to as the Kool-Aid Guy, Captain Kool-Aid, or Big Thirst, and originally as Pitcher Man) is the official mascot for Kool-Aid, a brand of flavored drink mix. The character has appeared on television and in print advertising as a fun-loving, gigantic, and joyful anthropomorphic pitcher filled with Cherry Kool-Aid. He is typically featured answering the call of children by smashing through walls or furnishings and then holding a pitcher filled with Kool-Aid while saying his catchphrase, "Oh, yeah!". The character's popular appeal has led to him being featured in numerous advertisements, tie-in products, and cameos.

== History ==
The 1954 debut commercial of the Pitcher Man

The first version of Kool-Aid Man, "the Pitcher Man", was created on July 10, 1954. Marvin Potts, an art director for a New York advertising agency, was hired by General Foods to create an image that would accompany the slogan "A 5-cent package makes two quarts". Inspired by watching his young son draw smiley faces on a frosted window, Potts created the Pitcher Man, a glass pitcher filled with Kool-Aid and with a wide smile emblazoned on its side. It was one of several designs he created, but the only one that stuck, and General Foods began to use the Pitcher Man in all of its advertisements. The character's face was sometimes animated in synchronization with the jingle.

The Kool-Aid Man making his trademark entrance in a 1978 Kool-Aid commercial saying his catchphrase

In 1974, arms and legs were added and Kool-Aid Man was introduced as a 6-foot-tall pitcher of cherry Kool-Aid, reportedly voiced by Grey Advertising composer Richard Berg and created by Alan Kupchick and Harold Karp (of Grey Advertising). Children, parched from playing, or other various activities, typically exchanged a few words referring to their thirst, then put a hand to the side of their mouths and shouted "Hey, Kool-Aid!", whereupon Kool-Aid Man made his grand entrance, breaking through walls, fences, ceilings, or furnishings, uttering the famous words "Oh, yeah!", then poured the dehydrated youngsters a glass of Kool-Aid. In 1979, the character's mouth was again animated to move in synchronization with the voice actor's singing or dialogue.

From at least 1979 to 1981, the character was known in Canada as Captain Kool-Aid.

By the 1980s, Kool-Aid Man had attained pop-culture icon status, and in 1983, was the subject of two video games for the Atari 2600 and Intellivision systems. He was also given his own short-lived comic book series (prior to that, he starred in a two-issue series published by the General Foods Corporation in 1975) called The Adventures of Kool-Aid Man. It ran for three issues under Marvel Comics from 1983 to 1985, and continued with issues #4-9 under Archie Comics, with art by Dan DeCarlo, from 1987 to 1990. It featured the Thirsties, a group of anthropomorphic sun-like creatures, as villains.

In 1994, the character became entirely computer-generated, replacing the live-action version of the character until 2008, but other characters, such as the children, remained live-action. In 1999, singer and voice actor Frank Simms began voicing the character. In 2009, the live-action character returned, playing street basketball and battling "Cola" to stay balanced on a log, where he was voiced by Pat Duke. Keith Hudson also briefly voiced the character in several Kraft Foods commercials. In 2015, the character was briefly voiced by Scott Golden. In 2016, Brock Powell began voicing the character for Kool-Aid's major rebranding, including collaborations with Progressive automotive and Nickelodeon and voiced the character for several digital campaigns until departing from the role in 2019. In 2020, Matt Howell began voicing the character.

== In popular culture ==
American artist David Hammons used Kool-Aid and incorporated a stamp of the Kool-Aid Man for a piece that hung in the Museum of Modern Art in New York City.

The Kool-Aid Man is a recurring character on the animated series Family Guy. He is also a playable character in Family Guy: The Quest for Stuff.

In December 2018, the Kool-Aid Man appeared with rapper Lil Jon in his Christmas song "All I Really Want for Christmas". Billboard named it "the greatest Christmas song of all time".

In a Super Bowl LIV commercial in 2020, Kool-Aid Man, alongside Mr. Clean, appeared in a commercial for fellow Kraft Heinz product Planters, shown as an attendee of the funeral of Mr. Peanut.

== Reception ==
Time magazine included the Kool-Aid Man on a list of the "Top 10 Creepiest Product Mascots", saying: "Our biggest gripe with Kool-Aid Man: Why did he have to cause such a mess every time he entered the scene?"
