= Air Raiders =

1982 video game

- Developer: M-Network
- Publisher: Mattel
- Designer: Larry Zwick
- Platform: Atari 2600
- Release: 1982
- Genre: Flight simulator
- Mode: Single player

Air Raiders is an action game developed by M-Network and published by Mattel. The game was released for the Atari 2600 in 1982. The game received mixed reviews from critics.

== Gameplay ==
The player destroying an enemy aircraft

Air Raiders is a flight simulator whose the player has the view of an airstrip as seen from the cockpit of a jet fighter. The goal of the game was to shoot as many enemies as possible, while avoiding the enemy's cannon fire and landing safely before the fuel runs out.

== Reception ==
Reception

Review scores
| Publication | Score |
|---|---|
| The Atari Times | 80% |
| AtariHQ | 5 |

Air Raiders was described as a highly underrated first-person jet fighter. A review on Epinions said that the game was impressive.
