= NASL Soccer =

1980 video game

- Intellivision box art by Jerrol Richardson
- Developer(s): APh Technological Consulting
- Publisher(s): Mattel Electronics
- Programmer(s): Kevin Miller
- Platform(s): Intellivision, Atari 2600
- Release: Intellivision: September 4, 1980; 2600: November 1982
- Genre(s): Sports (soccer)
- Mode(s): Multiplayer

NASL Soccer is a 1980 Intellivision two-player game based on the North American Soccer League (1968–1984). Mattel released an Atari 2600 version of the game under its M Network label as International Soccer in 1982.

== Reception ==
Video magazine's "1982 Guide to Electronic Games" found the game gameplay and implementation (its three-quarter perspective and scrolling playfield) "fascinating even to those who don't care for the real sport". NASL Soccer won the 1981 Arcade Awards (1980) for Best Sport Game.
