= MotoRodeo =

1990 video game

- Box art
- Developer: Axlon
- Publisher: Atari Corporation
- Programmer: Steve DeFrisco
- Platform: Atari 2600
- Release: July 1990
- Genre: Racing
- Modes: Single-player, multiplayer

MotoRodeo is a 1990 racing video game developed by Axlon and published by Atari Corporation for the Atari 2600. It was released in July 1990 as one of the console's last video games.

== Gameplay ==
The player controls a monster truck who races a human or computer opponent while scoring as many points as possible. Points can be scored by jumping on platforms, flipping and bouncing off platforms, crushing cars and walls, and grabbing bonus points scattered throughout the level. Power-ups can be used to speed up at the cost of player control. Water hazards, changing ramps, walls and other obstacles are available and must be jumped through to maintain speed. The player can choose between two types of tires used by the truck.
