= Kool-Aid Man (video game) =

1983 video game

- Atari 2600 box art
- Developer: Mattel Electronics
- Publishers: Mattel Electronics; M Network
- Designers: 2600; Steve Tatsumi; Intellivision; Vladimir Hrycenko; Mark Kennedy
- Artists: Intellivision; Monique Lujan-Bakerink
- Platforms: Atari 2600, Intellivision
- Release: 2600: September 1983; Intellivision: November 1983
- Genre: Action
- Mode: Single-player

Kool-Aid Man is a pair of action video games released for the Atari 2600 and Intellivision in 1983. Both were published by Mattel (under the M Network label for the Atari version), but each game is of unique design. They are centered on the Kool-Aid Man, the television mascot of the beverage Kool-Aid.

Initially available exclusively through mail-order, it was later released through traditional retail outlets.

== Gameplay ==
Kool-Aid Man on the Atari 2600

=== Atari 2600 ===
The version released on the Atari 2600 is a simple arcade style action game. The player controls a flying Kool-Aid Man, who hovers above a large pool of Kool-Aid. Flying back and forth across the screen are several “Thirsties” who will attempt to run into Kool-Aid Man. The Thirsties will occasionally stop to extend a straw into the pool below and begin drinking the Kool-Aid dry. It is while they are drinking from the pool that Kool-Aid Man can capture them for points. If Kool-Aid Man runs into the Thirsties while they are moving, he will be pushed backwards uncontrollably, giving the Thirsties more time to drink from the pool. The game is over once the Thirsties have drained the pool.

Power ups consist of letters that fly across the screen, which the player can pick up for temporary invincibility. The letters, K, S and W each stand for one of the three main ingredients of Kool-Aid (Kool-Aid mix, sugar and water).

A cutscene at the beginning of the game shows Kool-Aid Man breaking through a brick wall, much as he did in the commercials.

=== Intellivision ===
The Intellivision version of this game is an adventure game and is more complex than the Atari version. Rather than starting out as Kool-Aid Man, you instead control two children attempting to make a batch of Kool-Aid. In order to do so, the kids must traverse a large three story house in search of the three items (a pitcher, sugar and Kool-Aid mix). Once an item is found, it can be picked up and must be brought back to the kitchen and placed in front of the sink. A fourth item, the step latter must be used to reach the sugar, which is placed on top of a counter.

To further complicate matters, the player must avoid two Thirsties that patrol the house. If the player comes to close to one, they will begin chasing the player, and upon making contact will freeze one of the kids in place. Once all items are placed at the sink, a cutscene will show Kool-Aid Man burst through the wall, and now the player will control Kool-Aid Man, who must hunt down and capture the two Thirsties. Once both are defeated, the level is complete, and the player moves on to the next stage, which features a higher difficulty.

The game is over if the player fails to complete all the level’s objectives before the game’s ten minute timer runs out, or if both of the kids are frozen by the Thirsties.

== Reception ==
Reception

Review score
Publication	Score
AllGame	3/5

The Video Game Update did not recommend the game, stating it was meant for children but was dumb and boring. GameTrailers listed it as one of the most shameless licensed games of all time. Levi Buchanan for IGN considered the game to be "as painful as dropping Kool-Aid mix directly on your tongue", with paying $30 USD to have felt just as bitter.
