= Night Stalker (video game) =

1982 video game

- Intellivision box art by Jerrol Richardson
- Developer: Mattel Electronics
- Publisher: Mattel Electronics
- Designer: Steve Montero
- Programmer: Steve Montero
- Platforms: Intellivision, Atari 2600, Apple II, Aquarius, IBM PC
- Release: Intellivision: May 6, 1982; 2600: November 1982; Aquarius, Apple II, IBM PC: 1983
- Genres: Maze, shooter
- Mode: Single-player

Night Stalker is a top-down maze shooter video game designed by Steve Montero and released for the Intellivision console in 1982. It was ported to the Atari 2600 as Dark Cavern and released under Mattel's M Network label. Apple II, IBM PC, and Mattel Aquarius versions were published in 1983.

== Gameplay ==
The Dark Cavern port on the Atari 2600

The player controls a man trapped in a hedgerow maze with no exits and various threats. Some of these threats are natural such as bats and spiders, while others are artificial and more deadly like robots. The player starts in a bunker in the middle of the map completely defenseless. A gun icon flashes at one of five random locations which must be picked up in order to have firepower. Each gun has six bullets. Once the ammunition has been exhausted, the gun icon will appear again and the player must move defenselessly through the maze to retrieve it.

There are five different robots that can be encountered in accordance with the point total. The terrain is filled with corners and ambush points that the player must fully exploit. There is also a spider web in the northwest corner where the spider enemy spawns. Player movement is hindered here, and all firepower is heavily suppressed within, making it a strategic location. Also of importance is the bunker, in which the player begins each life. The bunker is a safe zone and the player is impervious to damage while inside, though the more advanced robots have the firepower to destroy it.

The game features only one unchanging level and no music, instead having a pulsing background beat playing at a set interval.

== Legacy ==
The Intellivision version was made available for the PlayStation 3 through PlayStation Home in fall 2012 in a collection titled Intellivision Gen2. In addition to being filled with bats and spiders, it had a greater variety of killer robots and an assortment of mazes.

In 2020, an updated version of Night Stalker was announced for release on the Intellivision Amico video game console. As the console has faced many delays, this updated version has not been released.
