= Space Battle =

- Developer: Mattel Electronics
- Publishers: Mattel Electronics, M Network
- Platforms: Intellivision, Atari 2600
- Release: 1979 (Intellivision); 1982 (Atari 2600)
- Genres: Shoot 'em up, strategy
- Modes: Single-player, multiplayer

Space Attack on the Atari 2600

Space Battle is a 1979 video game developed by Mattel Electronics for the Intellivision console. It was released for the Atari 2600 under the title Space Attack in 1982. The game supports both single player and two-player modes. An updated version of the game inspired by Battlestar Galactica was released in 2020.

== Overview ==
The game is a space shoot 'em up strategy game, in which players defend their mothership from an attacking alien fleet. Players switch between Rader Mode, in which they view hostile alien fleets and dispatch squadrons to attack them, and Battle Mode, in which they fight the alien ships. The game was originally developed by Mattel Electronics for the Intellivision console. M Network released a new version of the game for Atari 2600 in 1982.

== Reception ==
The game received mixed reviews, with praise for its controls and depth and criticism directed at its uninteresting graphics and repetitive gameplay. Tilt gave the game a positive review, praising its graphics and gameplay. TV Gamer wrote that it was "an ideal game for all new gamers who like a bit of strategy. However old gamers may find it a bit boring alter a while." Joystik scored the game 8 out of 10 for gameplay, graphics and longevity.
