= Swordquest =

Video game series

- Genre: Action-adventure game
- Developers: Atari, Inc. Digital Eclipse
- Publishers: Atari, Inc.
- Creators: Dan Hitchens; Tod Frye
- Platform: Atari 2600
- Original release: Earthworld: October 1982; Fireworld: February 1983; Waterworld: February 1984 (limited release); Airworld: August 2022 (original version unreleased)

Swordquest is a series of action-adventure video games developed and published by Atari, Inc. in the 1980s for the Atari 2600. It was developed as part of a contest, consisting of three finished games, Earthworld, Fireworld and Waterworld (with these titles occasionally appearing on cartridge labels and boxes with capitalized central Ws, e.g. EarthWorld), and a planned fourth game, Airworld.

== About ==
Each of the games came with a comic book that explained the plot, as well as containing part of the solution to a major puzzle that had to be solved to win the contest, with a series of prizes whose total value was $150,000. The series had its genesis as a possible sequel to Atari's groundbreaking 1979 title Adventure, but it developed mythology and a system of play that was unique.

The comic books were produced by DC Comics, written by Roy Thomas and Gerry Conway, and drawn and inked by George Pérez and Dick Giordano. All three game box covers were illustrated by an Atari in-house illustrator, Warren Chang. A special fan club offer was provided, allowing those who wanted the game to also get a T-shirt and poster for each game.

The games of the Swordquest series (along with Atari 2600 Raiders of the Lost Ark) were some of the earliest attempts to combine the narrative and logic elements of the adventure game genre with the twitch gameplay of the action genre, making them some of the first action-adventure games. However, due to Atari's financial problems related to the video game crash of 1983, the last contest along with the grand finale contest were never held and the final game in the series, Airworld was not released. As such the contest was never completed and the current unknown fate of some of the prizes has become an urban legend in the gaming community.

As part of Atari 50: The Anniversary Celebration, a collection of Atari games for its 50th anniversary in 2022, Digital Eclipse created a version of Airworld that completes the Swordquest series. In April 2025, Atari partnered with The Sandbox to release a version of the game on their platform which included all four worlds.

== Gameplay ==
Earthworld on Atari 2600

Each game of the Swordquest series was themed after the classical elements: earth, fire, water, and air. Each game required the player to move through a maze of rooms, collecting objects from one and placing them in other rooms. The arrangement or theme of the rooms varied with each game: Earthworld was themed after the Western zodiac, Fireworld after the Kabbalah tree of life, Waterworld after the chakras, and Airworld was to have been modeled after the I Ching. Traversing between rooms sometimes required the player to complete a "twitch"-style minigame to progress. When the player placed an item in its correct room, they would be presented with numerical clues that referred to a page and panel within the comic that was packaged with the game. There, the player would find a hidden word that was part of the larger Swordquest contest, as by submitting all the correct words in the correct order to Atari, they would be entered into the next phase of the project. The discovered words would form a relevant phrase towards the larger contest. In at least two cases, for Earthworld and Fireworld, there were more clues indicated by the game than required to be submitted. Players also had to identify a second clue in the game's instruction manual (for Earthworld, indicating prime numbers to use only clues on prime numbered pages) to know which clues to send in.

== Plot ==
The games follow twins named Tarra and Torr. Their parents were slain by King Tyrannus's guards, prompted by a prophecy by the king's wizard Konjuro that the twins would slay Tyrannus. The twins were then raised as commoners by thieves to avoid being slain by the king. When they go to plunder Konjuro's sea keep, they accidentally reveal their identities to him. The twins then start running from a demon summoned to kill them, but it appears that a jewel they stole attracts it. After smashing the stone to avoid the demon, two of Tyrannus's old advisers appear and tell the two about the "Sword of Ultimate Sorcery" and the "Talisman of Penultimate Truth." They are then transported to Earthworld.

After defeating many beasts of the Zodiac and another thief (Herminus) in Earthworld, the twins are transported to the "central chamber" where the "Sword of Ultimate Sorcery" and the "Talisman of Penultimate Truth" are kept. Upon reaching them, the sword burns a hole through its altar all the way to Fireworld. In Fireworld, the twins split up to look for water, and Torr, with the aid of the talisman, summons Mentorr who shows Torr the "Chalice of Light," which will quench his thirst. The twins reunite eventually and find the chalice. However, Torr drops it after he is startled, and it is revealed that the one they found was not the true chalice. Herminus then gives them the chalice, and it grows until it becomes large enough to swallow the twins and transports them to Waterworld.

Upon reaching Waterworld, the twins become separated. Konjuro casts a spell that causes the twins to lose their memories. Tarra travels to a ship made of ice and meets Cap'n Frost, who desires to find the "Crown of Life" and rule Waterworld. Meanwhile, Torr travels to an undersea kingdom and meets the city's ex-queen Aquana, who desires to find the "Crown of Life" in order to regain her throne. After a brief war between the ex-queen and captain, Herminus sets the twins to duel each other. They then pray to their deities for guidance, which summons Mentorr who allows them to regain their memories. The twins throw down their swords, causing the crown to be revealed and split in half. The halves are given to the ex-queen and the captain, who then rule as equals. The "Sword of Ultimate Sorcery" then transports the twins to Airworld where they would have to do battle with King Tyrannus and Konjuro.

While the comic for Airworld was started, the cancellation of the series left the comic unfinished.

== Development ==
The concept of Swordquest originated from Atari's previous Adventure video game, which is notable for one of the first documented Easter eggs. Adventure drew more interest once the Easter egg was found and documented, leading Atari to come up with a type of sequel where "marketing thought it would be a great idea to create a series of games where players would have to find clues both in the game [and in its physical materials]", as described by Atari historian Curt Vendel. As Atari was owned by Warner Communications at this point, they were able to use two of Warner's subsidiaries to help with this contest. DC Comics was used to create the comic book that would help create the setting where the word clues would be hidden, written by Gerry Conway and Roy Thomas and illustrated by George Pérez. The Franklin Mint crafted the game's prizes. The games themselves were programmed by Tod Frye.

=== Contest ===
Atari had designed the Swordquest contest to award a winner for each of the four games. For each game, they had planned to bring all winners to the Atari headquarters in Sunnyvale, California, to race to complete a specially-programmed version of that game to be the first to finish it. The person with the fastest completion would be named the winner and be awarded a "treasure", produced by Franklin Mint, each valued at around US$25,000 at the time of Swordquest's release. The prizes were:

- Earthworld: The "Talisman of Penultimate Truth", an 18-karat solid gold disc studded with 12 diamonds, the birthstones of the 12 Zodiac signs and a miniature white gold sword set atop it.
- Fireworld: The "Chalice of Light", a goblet made of platinum and gold studded with diamonds, rubies, sapphires, pearls, and green jade.
- Waterworld: The "Crown of Life", a solid gold crown decorated with diamonds, rubies, sapphires, and aquamarines.
- Airworld: The "Philosopher's Stone", a large piece of white jade encased in an 18-karat gold box encrusted with emeralds, rubies, and diamonds.

The four winners would then have competed in a final contest to win the ultimate prize, "The Sword of Ultimate Sorcery" with a silver blade and an 18-carat gold handle covered with diamonds, emeralds, sapphires, and rubies, that was valued at US$50,000.

For Earthworld, about 5000 entries were received, but only eight answered correctly. The contest was held in May 1983, with Stephen Bell winning the Talisman. For Fireworld, Atari received several more entries, with 73 of these being correct. For practicality, Atari required the 73 finalists to write a brief essay of what they liked about the game, selecting the top 50 replies to continue to the final competition, held in January 1984. This was won by Michael Rideout, who was awarded the Chalice.

At this point in time, Atari had suffered major financial setbacks due to the 1983 video game crash. Atari was further in the midst of dealing with fallout from an insider trading scandal by former CEO Ray Kassar; Kassar was replaced by James J. Morgan in mid-1983, and looking to cut financial losses, eventually cancelled the Swordquest project, despite work having already started on Airworld. However, because the company had already advertised the availability of the Waterworld contest, Atari's lawyers required the company to continue the contest. To limit the number of entries, Waterworld was only made available to members of the Atari Club. During the contest period, in mid-1984, Atari was sold to Jack Tramiel, the owner of Commodore International. Tramiel, who had been more focused on the success of home computers than gaming consoles, placed the Atari divisions in a new company, Tramel Technology, and reviewed the state of all divisions, furthering the troubles in completing the Waterworld contest. Most who did enter the Waterworld contest were told they did not qualify for the final, but according to Vendel, Atari was legally required to follow through as advertised on the Waterworld contest. Vendel stated that Atari did secretly invite those with correct entries to hold the final round, and the Crown was awarded to a person, their name remaining anonymous due to legal requirements. Because they could not hold the ultimate final round, Bell and Rideout were both awarded an additional US$15,000 as well as an Atari 7800 as a compensation prize, and granting the ten finalists of Waterworld US$2,000 each.

The fate of the prizes has become an urban legend in the gaming community since the cancellation of the project. Of the five treasures, Rideout has claimed, as recently as 2017, that he still has the Chalice in his possession, stored in a safe deposit box. Bell fell out of contact following the Swordquest event, but according to Vendel and Rideout, Bell appeared to have had the disc part of the Talisman melted down for its value (about US$15,000 at the time), keeping the small sword, diamonds, and birthstones; the current fate of these is unknown. The fate of the Crown is unknown; Vendel stated that while Atari was required to hold the contest, they could have simply awarded the winner with a cash prize equivalent as opposed to the Crown.

Since they were never part of any contest, the Philosopher's Stone and the Sword have seemingly disappeared. Some sources have claimed that Tramiel took possession of the prizes himself, based on rumoured observations that Atari staff or associates of Tramiel had made of seeing a similar looking sword mounted in Tramiel's office or on his home mantel. However, Vendel believes that the persons who started this rumor may have mistaken a Tramiel family heirloom for the Swordquest sword. Vendel believes that it is unlikely that Tramiel would have been able to keep the Stone, Sword, and (if not given away) Crown, as when Atari, Inc was sold, these items were still the property of Warner Communications, and would have been returned to the Franklin Mint. With the Franklin Mint later being sold in 1985 to American Protective Services, and the original Atari business no longer existing, the prizes were most likely melted back down to their base components for reuse elsewhere, according to Vendel.

Atari released the Atari 50 collection in 2022. As part of the collection, Digital Eclipse developed a new version of Airworld.

== Comic books ==
=== Original mini-comics ===
Each of the three released games shipped with a comic book, published jointly by Atari and DC Comics. The books included clues to solve the puzzles within each of the games.

=== Dynamite Entertainment mini-series ===
In February 2017, Dynamite Entertainment announced a new comic book series, called Swordquest, but based on the actual contest around the three games, rather than the story within the games. It was a six-issue series, starting with a special #0 "Preview" book that sold with a cover price of 25¢ and was published in May 2017. The remaining 5 issues, published monthly after the preview, sold at $3.99 each. In addition, Dynamite released a trade paperback that reprinted the three mini-comics along with the mini-comic for the game Yars' Revenge. As with the originals, the TPB is sized as a mini-comic.

The series featured the story of a person who had played the three Swordquest games (with help from two friends who were brother and sister) when he was younger and was anticipating Airworld. Now as an adult, he continues his efforts to play Airworld using his old Atari hardware, but is caught up with a mysterious figure who offers to help him obtain the real "Sword of Ultimate Sorcery" from its resting place in the World Arcade Museum. As well as being valuable, it may have its own mysterious powers. The man contacts his two childhood friends to accompany him on his new "Swordquest".

The comic was written by Chad Bowers and Chris Sims and had art by Scott Kowalchuk under the pseudonym "Ghostwriter X". A trade paperback reprint of all six issues, titled Swordquest: Realworld was released in February 2018.

== Reception ==
Richard A. Edwards reviewed Swordquest: Earthworld in The Space Gamer No. 61. Edwards commented that "The only reason to purchase a copy of Swordquest: Earthworld is to try and solve the puzzle and win the prize. Gamers not interested in spending the time required should pass this one." In 1995, Flux magazine ranked Swordquest: Earthworld 71st on their Top 100 Video Games.

== In popular culture ==
Both the novel Ready Player One and the film adaptation reference the Swordquest series.

SCP-1926, an entry on the SCP Foundation wiki, is based on the unreleased Swordquest: Airworld game.
