= Star Strike =

1981 video game

- Intellivision box art
- Developer: Mattel Electronics
- Publisher: Mattel Electronics
- Designers: Hal Finney; Brett Stutz
- Platforms: Intellivision, Atari 2600
- Release: Intellivision: NA: December 22, 1981; EU: 1982; 2600: June 1983
- Genre: Shoot 'em up
- Mode: Single-player

Star Strike is a shoot 'em up video game released by Mattel for its Intellivision console in 1981. The Intellivision's best-selling game in 1982, with over 800,000 copies sold, Star Strike was inspired by the attack on the Death Star in the 1977 film Star Wars. The player must drop bombs on alien weapons silos before Earth moves into range.

A port of Star Strike for the Atari 2600 was published under Mattel's M Network label in 1983.

== Gameplay ==
Gameplay screenshot

In Star Strike, invading aliens have targeted a super-weapon on planet Earth. As soon as Earth moves into range, the weapon will be fired and destroy the planet. The player controls a spaceship launched at the invaders in an attempt to destroy the weapon before it can be fired. To do so, the player must bomb five red weapons silos in a narrow trench. If one of the silos remains when Earth is in range, the planet is doomed; George Plimpton bragged that the game depicted the "total destruction of a planet".

The player's spaceship is equipped with lasers and bombs, both in unlimited supply. The bombs will be dropped on the weapons silos, while the lasers can destroy enemy spacecraft sent to intercept the player. While the player has only one spaceship per game, the spaceship is well-armored and can take multiple hits, but each hit will cause some form of temporary damage affecting the player's control of the ship, such as decreasing its maneuverability or causing sporadic faults in the weapons systems. A hit will also cause the ship to lose altitude, making it extremely dangerous when flying low. If the player's ship collides with the trench or an alien fighter, the game ends and Earth is destroyed.

The game's scoring takes the form of a countdown timer. Starting at 8000 points, the timer counts down to zero, at which point Earth is in range of the enemy weapon. When the player destroys the fifth silo, the alien vessel is destroyed and the timer stops, thus representing the player's score for that game. Points are added to the timer for each destroyed alien fighter, giving the player additional time to complete the mission.

At higher difficulty levels, each silo must be hit on its first pass. One game variation starts with zero score and points awarded for each silo and alien fighter destroyed; any missed silo ends the game.

== Legacy ==
Star Strike is included in the Intellivision Lives! collection for computers and other video game consoles, like the PlayStation 2 and GameCube. In June 2010, Star Strike was made available on Microsoft's Game Room service for its Xbox 360 console and for Games for Windows Live.

== See also ==
- Starhawk
