= Astrosmash =

1981 video game

- Intellivision box art
- Developers: Mattel Electronics: Android, iOS Rogue Rocket Games; Windows, macOS, Switch, Xbox One/X/S, PS4, PS5 Rogue Rocket Games, BBG Entertainment
- Publishers: Mattel Electronics; Sears: Android, iOS Amico Entertainment; Windows, macOS, Switch, Xbox One/X/S, PS4, PS5 BBG Entertainment
- Designer: John Sohl
- Platform: Intellivision: Atari 2600, Aquarius, Android, iOS, Windows, macOS, Nintendo Switch, Xbox One, Xbox Series X/S, PlayStation 4, PlayStation 5
- Release: October 15, 1981: Intellivision; NA: October 15, 1981; EU: 1982 2600; July 1982 Aquarius; 1983 Windows, macOS, Switch, Xbox One, Xbox Series X/S; WW: October 12, 2023 Android; WW: November 18, 2023 PlayStation 4, PlayStation 5; WW: December 11, 2024 iOS; WW: December 13, 2024
- Genre: Fixed shooter
- Modes: Single-player, multiplayer

Astrosmash is a fixed shooter video game for the Intellivision console, designed by John Sohl and released by Mattel Electronics in 1981. The player uses a laser cannon to destroy falling meteors, bombs, and other targets.

With more than a million copies sold, Astrosmash is among the top five best-selling Intellivision games. A free by mail offer with the purchase of the console boosted the game's sales. It was also promoted in the United States and Canada via a high score contest where top scorers were flown to Houston for the finals.

An Atari 2600 port was released under Mattel's M Network label as Astroblast.

== Plot ==
The Intellivision game catalog features the caption: "Spin. Blast. And drop into hyperspace to avoid a killer asteroid shower. Power on. Attack computer engaged. Fire a quick burst at the alien antagonists. Got 'em!" The actual package gives a more specific description: "You're in command of a battery of laser guns. You have unlimited ammo and a lot of targets! You can roll up big scores by hitting a spectacular barrage of falling rocks, bombs, guided missiles and attacking UFOs..."

== Gameplay ==
A laser cannon defends the Earth from a meteor shower.

Astrosmash resembles a cross between Space Invaders and Asteroids. The player controls a laser cannon that can scroll left or right along a flat plane in order to target falling objects, such as large or small meteors, large or small spinning bombs, and guided missiles, as well as a UFO that crosses the screen from time to time at higher levels. Low hills and stars are seen in the background.

There are four types of targets, each of which may move at a range of speeds. As the game advances, the range of speeds for each type of target increases.

1. The bulk of the targets are meteors, which come in two sizes and various colors. Both sizes fall vertically when entering the screen. Large meteors may be destroyed with a direct hit, or may split into two smaller meteors, which fall diagonally in opposite directions. Small meteors are destroyed in a single hit.
2. The player must also shoot spinning bombs, or spinners, which are white, come in two sizes, and spin while falling vertically. Each spinner emits a loud whistling sound, which gradually lowers in pitch as it approaches the ground.
3. Guided missiles appear occasionally as white dots making a pulsing sound, and may fall diagonally toward the player's initial location, or track the laser cannon as it moves left and right. If a missile reaches the ground, it may disappear, or it may continue to track left or right, and can only be avoided by entering hyperspace. The missile may change directions several times before disappearing.
4. UFOs cross the screen occasionally, beginning at level 4, firing non-guided salvos aimed at the player's laser cannon.

The player loses a laser cannon each time it is hit by a falling meteor, a guided missile, a non-guided salvo, or by shrapnel from a nearby explosion, and any time a spinner reaches the ground, even if it does not strike the gun. Each target hit increases the player's score; it decreases by half as much each time a meteor reaches the ground, or a laser cannon is destroyed. An extra gun is awarded each time the player's peak score increases by 1,000 points.

The game has six levels, each of which features increased speed and scoring. Each level is represented by a differently-colored background. Level 1, up to 999 points, is black; level 2, from 1,000 to 4,999 points, is blue; level 3, from 5,000 to 19,999 points, is purple; level 4, from 20,000 to 49,999 points, is turquoise; level 5, from 50,000 to 99,999 points, is gray; and level 6, above 100,000 points, is black again. Speed continues to increase along with the player's peak score, at 200,000, 500,000, and 1,000,000 points.

The player has the option of firing single shots by pressing the fire buttons, or switching to automatic fire at a rate of three shots per second. The hyperspace option moves the gun to a random location, which may or may not be safer than the starting point. The game can also be paused at any time.

== Development ==
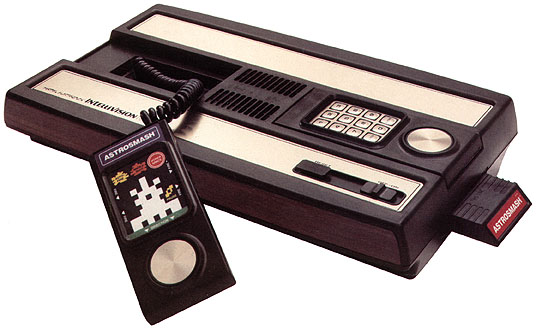
Astrosmash cartridge inserted and the overlay on the left controller

Astrosmash was conceived when a game called Meteor!, an Asteroids clone, did not fill up the ROM space of an entire cartridge. The extra space was used to create a variation of the game called Avalanche! The Meteor! game was cancelled at the last minute, due to concerns that it was too similar to Asteroids. Programmer John Sohl programmed a "branch" around the opening-screen menu, leading directly to the Avalanche! variation, retitled Astrosmash. The games were compatible, since they were designed together, and used the same sprites and sound effects. In rare instances, if the console's reset button is pressed rapidly, an error can occur, resulting in the game starting in the original Meteor! format.

Mattel released the game for the Atari 2600. Renamed Astroblast, it has faster play than the Intellivision original.

== Reception ==
Astrosmash was reviewed in 1982 by Video magazine where it was described as "an obvious attempt to provide Intellivision-ites with a solitaire arcade-style target game". The pacing of the early stages in the game was described as "dull and plodding", although later in the game the pace becomes much more challenging. The color-coding of stages corresponding with difficulty level and player score was described as "not a bad idea", but reviewers noted that "the greyish blue used for the 1000-to-4999-point range is especially odious" and described this hue as "assaulting the optic nerves". Despite the lackluster review, the game was ultimately recommended as "probably worth a try" for Intellivision users seeking a new experience because the Intellivision "traditionally lacks arcade programs", and eight months later in Video's 1982 Guide to Electronic Games, Astrosmash was described as "probably the most popular action game produced by Mattel for play on the Intellivision".

By June 1983, the game had shipped 984,900 copies, making it the third most widely distributed Intellivision game, behind Major League Baseball and Las Vegas Poker & Blackjack. Sales reached 2 million copies by 1999.

== Legacy ==
Astrosmash T-shirts are worn by the characters Cisco Ramon, in the first season of The Flash, and Sheldon Cooper, in various episodes of The Big Bang Theory.

An updated version of Astrosmash was announced as one of the six games included with the Intellivision Amico console. After placing an indefinite halt on the Amico console's development, the console's creator selected its remake of Astrosmash as part of the company's Amico Home initiative. As such, an Android version was released in late 2023, followed by an iOS version in December 2024.

In late 2023, BBG Entertainment GmbH acquired the Astrosmash trademark, along with the right to port the Intellivision Amico version of Astrosmash to PC and major consoles. These versions were released on October 12 of the same year.
