= Armor Ambush =

1982 video game

- Developer(s): M Network
- Publisher(s): M Network
- Designer(s): Hal Finney
- Platform(s): Atari 2600
- Release: September 1982
- Genre(s): Shoot 'em up
- Mode(s): Multiplayer

Armor Ambush is a 1982 shoot 'em up video game for the Atari 2600 produced by M Network. Mattel originally released the game in 1979 as Armor Battle for its Intellivision console.

== Gameplay ==
Gameplay screenshot

Armor Ambush is a shoot 'em up video game that gives players control over tanks that battle one another over terrain that offers varying degrees of texture and traversability. Dueling tanks was a theme familiar to owners of the Atari 2600 since Combat (the game packaged with nearly every Atari 2600 system), and Armor Ambush has a similar premise; however, it expands upon the simple battles available to players of Combat. The game takes place on a different randomly selected battlefield each round. Additionally, players can drop mines on the battlefield by simultaneously pressing the fire button and pulling down on the joystick. The mines remain active for the duration of the battle, destroying either tank that runs over them. Players are able to control two tanks and switch between them on command. The terrain is more diverse, featuring areas of foliage, water, and natural barriers. But as with "Combat", there is no AI for the computer, and the game cannot be played solo.
