= Tod Frye =

American computer programmer

- Born: 1956 (age 69–70)
- Occupation: Computer programmer
- Known for: Pac-Man

Tod R. Frye (born 1955) is an American computer programmer once employed by Atari, Inc., and is most notable for developing the home adaptation of Pac-Man for the Atari 2600 video computer system. Following the collapse of Atari he worked at video game and computer game companies such as 3DO and Pronto Games.

In 2015 he was working as Senior Embedded Software Engineer for the SunPower Corporation, where he worked in the field of IoT, developing hardware and software systems for monitoring solar power systems. His work extended from edge devices, collecting and transmitting device telemetry, to cloud hosted Big Data systems for storing, analyzing, and reporting device data.

Leaving Sunpower in late 2016, Frye joined Bonsai AI, which was developing an artificial intelligence platform, focusing primarily on reinforcement learning.

== Atari Pac-Man ==
Frye landed the 2600 Pac-Man project in early 1981. Atari had licensed the arcade games Defender and Pac-Man and while Frye preferred Defender, when fellow programmer Bob Polaro got that assignment, Frye got Pac-Man by default. Frye's landing the high-profile title did not pass without critical comment from fellow developers at Atari, as Frye was a newer employee. One Atari employee wrote "Why Frye?" on the Pac-Man arcade machine contained in Atari's in-office arcade room. In response, Frye drew a horizontal line over the "Why", which means "Why not Frye" in logic notation.

Frye's Pac-Man port was started in May 1981, and was the most anticipated release for 1982, so marketing pressed Frye to produce the game on a very strict timetable (lead times on the cartridge ROMs was several months, so the code needed to be completed in September 1981 to get the product into stores during the first quarter of 1982). Atari corporate management demanded Frye complete the game in the standard 4K ROM, as the 8K ROM form factor was not quite available at the time. Frye made several decisions which later proved controversial. First, he decided that supporting two-player gameplay was important, which meant 25–30 bytes of the 2600's meager 128 byte memory was utilized to store the second player's game state, score, etc. as opposed to using it for game data and features. Second, due to time constraints, he chose to abandon plans for a flicker-management system which would have minimized the flashing of objects. Finally, his game did not conform to the arcade game's color scheme in order to comply with Atari's official home product policy that only space type games should feature black backgrounds. Frye states that there were no negative comments within Atari about these elements, but upon release the title drew criticism for not closely hewing to the specifics of its arcade counterpart.

Pac-Man proved to be a stunning financial coup for Atari, and Frye reportedly received $0.10 in royalties per Pac-Man cartridge. Atari would manufacture 12 million cartridges, making Frye a millionaire in the process.

== Notable contributions ==
Frye contributed to the LCD Breakout Atari handheld, the version of Asteroids for the Atari 8-bit computers, the Swordquest series (Earthworld, Fireworld, Waterworld, and the uncompleted Airworld). Unreleased games include Save Mary, Shooting Arcade and Xevious (Atari 2600).

Frye also developed the Red-Blue kernel (frequently misnamed as the Red-vs-Blue kernel) vertical sprite re-use technology used in Realsports Football and several other Atari 2600 products.

After parting ways with Atari, Frye later worked for Axlon (one of the many companies founded by Atari Pioneer Nolan Bushnell) and was hired as a programmer alongside fellow Atari employees Rob Zydbel, Bob Smith, and Howard Scott Warshaw at The 3DO Company.

Frye remains active in video games, making technical contributions to classic compilations such as Midway Arcade Treasures.
