= Sprintmaster =

1989 video game

- Box art
- Developer: Atari Corporation
- Publisher: Atari Corporation
- Programmer: Bob Polaro
- Platform: Atari 2600
- Release: March 1989
- Genre: Sports
- Modes: Single-player, multiplayer

Sprintmaster is a 1989 racing video game developed and published by Atari Corporation for the Atari 2600. It was released in March 1989. Despite the gameplay similarities, it is otherwise not related to Atari Games' arcade video game Super Sprint. Bob Polaro programmed the game.

== Gameplay ==
Sprintmaster is a top-down racing game where the player races against a human or computer or opponent around nine set courses for up to 50 laps. Power-ups allow the player to speed up. Obstacles such as oil spills can cause the player to lose traction and hinder their progress.
