= Catalyst Technologies =

Technology company incubator

The Catalyst Technologies Venture Capital Group was one of the first technology company incubators. It was founded in 1981 in Sunnyvale, California by Atari co-founder Nolan Bushnell and received much assistance from fellow Atari luminary, Al Alcorn. The term Catalyst Group may refer to both the companies spawned by the Group and the people involved.

The Catalyst Group continued to operate throughout the 1980s, with most of the Catalyst Group companies closing by 1986.
