= Pac-Man (Atari 2600 video game) =

1982 video game

- Box art by Hiro Kimura
- Developer: Atari, Inc.
- Publishers: Atari, Inc.
- Designer: Tod Frye
- Programmer: Tod Frye
- Series: Pac-Man
- Platform: Atari 2600
- Release: March 1982
- Genre: Maze
- Modes: Single-player, multiplayer

Pac-Man is a 1982 maze video game developed and published by Atari, Inc. for the Atari 2600 (Note: The console was called the Atari Video Computer System (Atari VCS) from its launch in 1977 until it was rebranded as the Atari 2600 in November 1982.) as a port of Namco's 1980 arcade game of the same name. The player controls the title character, who attempts to eat all of the wafers in a maze while avoiding four ghosts that pursue him. Eating flashing wafers at the corners of the screen causes the ghosts to temporarily turn blue and flee, allowing Pac-Man to eat them for bonus points. Once eaten, a ghost is reduced to a pair of eyes, which return to the center of the maze to be restored.

Pac-Man was programmed by Tod Frye and took six months to complete. Expecting high sales, Atari produced more than a million copies of the highly anticipated game and held a "National Pac-Man Day" on April 3, 1982, to promote its release.

Pac-Man remains the best-selling Atari 2600 game of all time, selling over 8 million copies, and was the all-time best-selling video game for several years. Despite its commercial success, the game was panned by critics for its poor graphics and sound, as well as for bearing little resemblance to the original arcade game. Since its release, it has been considered one of the worst video games ever made and one of the worst arcade ports released on the system.

== Gameplay ==
The player uses a joystick to control Pac-Man, navigating him through a maze of consumable dashes called video wafers, opposed by a quartet of multi-colored ghosts. The goal of the game is to earn a high score by having Pac-Man eat video wafers, power pills, vitamins and ghosts. Every time Pac-Man eats all the video wafers in the maze, he earns an extra life and a new maze full of wafers. A group of ghosts roam the maze, trying to eat Pac-Man. If one touches Pac-Man, he loses a life. Pac-Man can be played as a one-player game or a two-player game with the players alternating turns after Pac-Man is eaten by a ghost.

Near the corners of the maze are four larger, flashing consumables known as Power Pills that turn the ghosts a blue transparent colour and give Pac-Man the temporary ability to eat the ghosts and earn points. When a ghost is eaten, its disembodied eyes return to the big square chamber in the center of the maze to respawn. The blue ghosts turn pink during the last moments of a Power Pill's effect, signaling that they are about to become dangerous again. The final consumable items are the Vitamins, which appear periodically directly below the nest and award the player with further points.

The game has eight variations, offering two different starting speeds for Pac-Man and four speeds for the ghosts. Setting the console's A–B difficulty switches can also handicap one or both players. If the switch is set to A position, the power pills' effects do not last as long.

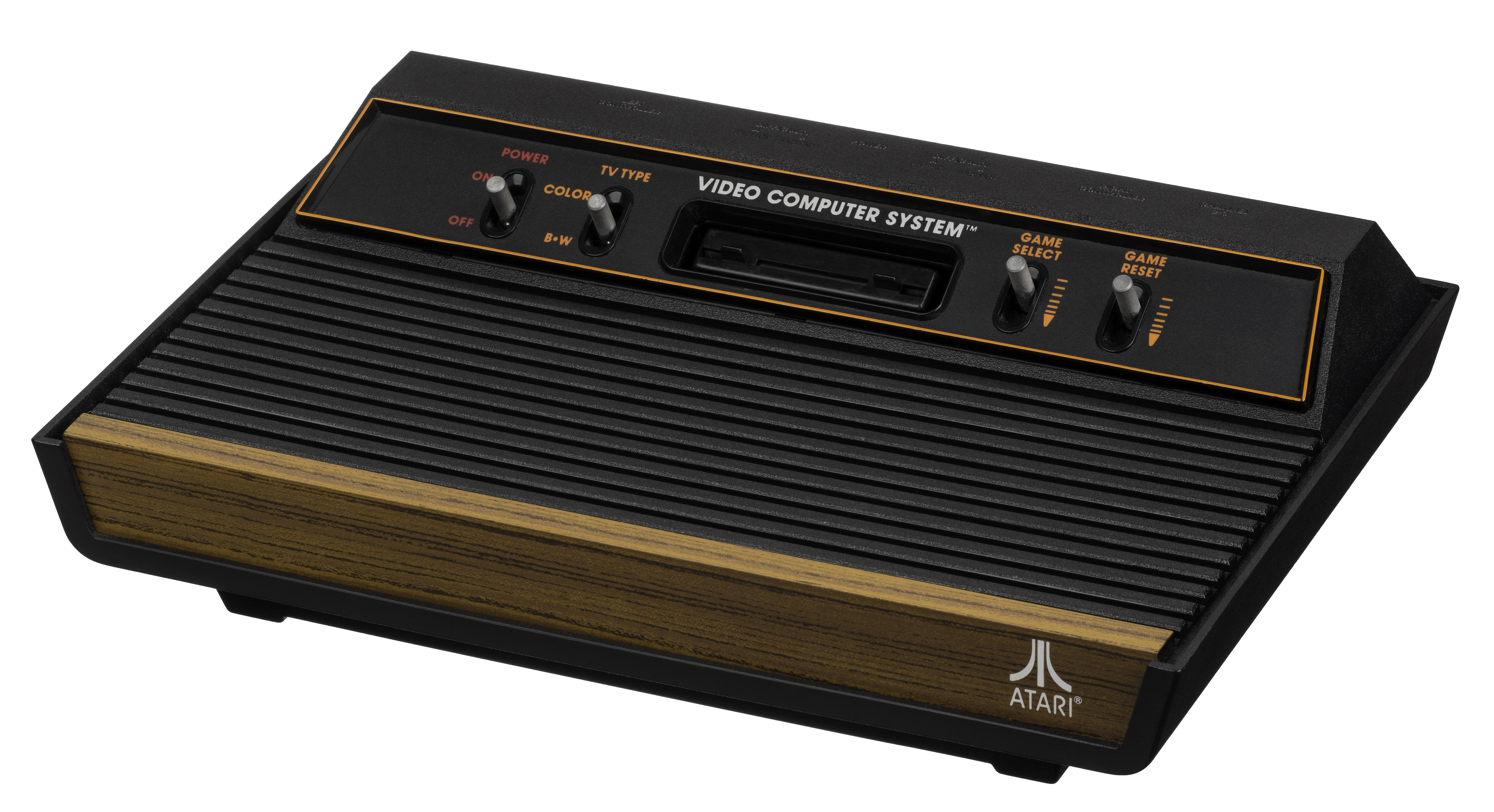
The Atari 2600 features switches on the console that could be used to toggle the difficulty levels for players in Pac-Man.

Pac-Man for the Atari 2600 has various changes from the original game. Visual changes include the ghosts not having unique colors, and not looking in the direction they are moving in. Pac-Man's sprite now has visible eyes and only faces left or right as he navigates the maze. The game no longer features collectible items such as fruits or the key, which are now replaced by an orange box called the vitamin. The game also lacks the cutscenes and sounds from the arcade version.

The game has a different maze than the arcade game. There are fewer video wafers and they are displayed as thin rectangles instead of the dots of the arcade version. The maze is simplified in structure and appearance, lacking the rounded edges and intricate passages of the arcade, and the escape passages at the sides are moved to the top and bottom.

== Development ==
After Pac-Man proved to be a success in the United States, Atari decided to license the game and port it to its Atari 2600 console (known at the time as the Atari Video Computer System). Programming was assigned to Tod Frye, who was not provided with any arcade design specifications to work from and had to figure out how the game worked by playing it. Frye spent 80-hour weeks over six months developing it. The finished game uses a 4 KB ROM cartridge, chosen for its lower manufacturing costs compared to 8 KB bank-switched cartridges, which had recently become available. As with any contemporary arcade port, the simple Atari 2600 hardware was a considerable limitation. Joe Decuir said that he and other Atari hardware designers did not expect that a game like Pac-Man, which "pushed too hard", would be ported to it.

The arcade Pac-Man system board contained 16 KB of ROM to store the game code, 2 KB of main RAM for use by the game code and 2 KB of video RAM to store the screen state, whereas the Atari 2600 featured only 128 bytes of RAM and none dedicated to video, effectively 1/32nd as much RAM. The Zilog Z80 microprocessor used by the Namco Pac-Man arcade system is clocked at three times the speed of the MOS 6507 microprocessor in the Atari 2600, though the Z80 does typically do less work per clock cycle.

To deal with these limitations, Frye simplified the maze's intricate pattern of corridors to a more repetitive pattern. The small tan pellets in the arcade original were changed to rectangular "wafers" that shared the color of the wall, a change necessitated because both the pellets and walls were drawn with the 2600's fixed-width Playfield graphics. To achieve the effect of wafers disappearing as Pac-Man eats them, the actual map of the maze was updated as the data was written into the Playfield registers, excluding the pellets that had been eaten. The 2600's Player-Missile graphics system (sprites) was used for the remaining objects: the one-bit-wide Missiles were used to render the flashing power pills and the center of the vitamin. Pac-Man and ghost characters were implemented using the 2600's two Player objects, with one being used for Pac-Man and the other for all four ghosts. Consequently, each ghost only appears once out of every four frames. This creates a flickering effect that takes advantage of the slow phosphorescent fade of CRT monitors and the concept of persistence of vision, resulting in the image appearing to linger on screen longer. However, the flickering is noticeable and makes each individual ghost's color nearly impossible to discern. Frye chose to abandon plans for a flicker-management system to minimize the flashing in part because Atari didn't seem to care about that issue in its zeal to have the game released. According to Frye, his game also did not conform to the arcade game's color scheme in order to comply with Atari's official home product policy that only space-type games should feature black backgrounds. Another quality impact was his decision that two-player gameplay was important, which meant that the 23 bytes required to store the current difficulty, the state of the dots on the current maze, remaining lives, and the score had to be doubled for a second player, consuming 46 of the 2600's meager 128-byte memory and preventing their use for additional game features.

Oft-repeated stories claim that Atari wanted to or did release a prototype in order to capitalize on the 1981 holiday season; however, the retail release was a final product. Frye has stated that there were no negative comments within Atari about these elements, but after seeing the game, Coin Division marketing manager Frank Ballouz reportedly informed then-Atari president and CEO Ray Kassar that he felt enthusiasts would not want to play it; his opinion, however, was dismissed. The company ran newspaper ads and promoted the product in catalogs, describing it as differing "slightly from the original".

== Release ==
To help sales, Atari promoted and protected its exclusive licensing of Pac-Man by taking legal action against companies that released similar clones. For example, Atari sued Philips for its 1981 Magnavox Odyssey² game K.C. Munchkin! alleging copyright infringement. In the landmark case Atari, Inc. v. North American Philips Consumer Electronics Corp., the Court of Appeals allowed a preliminary injunction against Philips to prevent the sale of Munchkin cartridges. However, Atari failed to stop other games such as On-Line Systems' Jawbreaker and Gobbler.

Several retailers assisted Atari with the release of the game, such as JCPenney, who became the first retailer to launch a nationwide advertising campaign on television for a software title. Atari, continuing a long-standing relationship with Sears, also produced Pac-Man cartridges under the department store's label.

Atari's Pac-Man was re-released as downloadable content for the Atari 50 (2022) video game compilation in November 2025 and re-released on a physical cartridge as part of a Pac-Man double-pack for their Atari 2600+ system.

== Reception ==
=== Sales ===
Anticipation for the game was high. Atari stated in 1981 that it had preorders for "three or four million" copies of the Atari 2600 version. Goldman Sachs analyst Richard Simon predicted the sale of 9 million units during 1982, which would yield a profit of $200 million. Pac-Man was an initial commercial success, selling more than a million cartridges in less than a month, helped by Atari's $1.5 million publicity campaign. It was the best-selling home video game of 1982, with over 7.2 million cartridges sold that year and over $200 million ($670 million adjusted for inflation) in gross revenue. It replaced Space Invaders as the best-selling Atari 2600 title and also became the overall best-selling video game up until then (a title it held for several years until eventually being surpassed by Nintendo's Super Mario Bros.) Pac-Man also propelled sales of the Atari 2600 to 12 million units by 1982. Frye reportedly received $0.10 in royalties per copy.

Purchases of the game had slowed by the summer of 1982, with unsold copies available in large quantities. Atari went on to sell over 684,000 cartridges in 1983. It had sold a cumulative 7,956,413 cartridges by 1983, and a further 139,173 units for $706,967 (equivalent to $2,000,000 in 2025) between 1986 and 1990, for a total of over 8 million cartridges sold by 1990. By 2004, the cartridges were still very common among collectors and enthusiasts—though the Sears versions were rarer—and priced lower.

=== Critical response ===
Pac-Man must eat the wafers while avoiding the ghosts. The ghosts take turns appearing on the screen, creating a widely criticized flicker effect.

At release, critics negatively compared the port to its original arcade form, panning the audio, visuals and gameplay. On May 11, 1982, Electronic Games magazine published its first ever negative review for an Atari video game, giving the game a rating of four out of ten and saying, "Considering the anticipation and considerable time the Atari designers had to work on it, it's astonishing to see a home version of a classic arcade contest so devoid of what gave the original its charm." Video Magazine admitted it was "challenging, and there are a few visual pluses", before lamenting, "Unfortunately those who cannot evaluate Pac-Man through lover's eyes are likely to be disappointed." The premiere issue of Video Games Player from Fall 1982 called the port "just awful". Video Games Player magazine gave the graphics and sound its lowest rating of C, while giving the game an overall B− rating. Electronic Fun with Computers & Games gave it an overall B− rating, with a C rating for graphics. The New York Times wrote in October that "though word-of-mouth on the game has not been considered great, the cartridge is still selling" because of Pac-Man's fame.

In 1983, Creative Computing Video & Arcade Games reviewer Danny Goodman said that the game fails as a replica of its arcade form: "Atari stated clearly in its description of the cartridge that Atari's Pac-Man 'differs slightly from the original'. That, perhaps, was an understatement." Conversely, he stated that such criticism was unfair because the hardware of the Atari 2600 could not properly emulate the arcade game. Goodman further said that the port is a challenging maze game in its own right, and it would have been a success if fans had not expected to play a game closer to the original. Phil Wiswell of Video Games criticized the game's poor graphics, mockingly referring to it as "Flickerman", while Softline questioned why Atari opposed Pac-Man clones when the 2600 version was less like the original "than any of the pack of imitators".

The game has remained poorly rated. Computer and Video Games magazine rated the game 57% in 1989. Next Generation magazine editors in 1998 called it the "worst coin-op conversion of all time", and attributed the mass dissatisfaction to its poor quality. In 2006, IGN's Craig Harris echoed similar statements and listed it as the worst arcade conversion, citing poor audio and visuals that did not resemble the original. Another IGN editor, Levi Buchanan, described it as a "disastrous port", citing the color scheme and flickering ghosts. Skyler Miller of AllGame said that although the game was only a passing resemblance to the original, it was charming despite its many differences and faults.

Frye did not express regret over his part in Pac-Man's port and felt he made the best decisions he could at the time. However, Frye stated that he would have done things differently with a larger capacity ROM. Video game industry researchers Nick Montfort and Ian Bogost attribute the poor reception to the technical differences between the Atari 2600 console and the arcade hardware used in Pac-Man cabinets. They further stated that the conversion is a lesson in maintaining the social and cultural context of the original source. Montfort and Bogost commented that players were disappointed with the flickering visual effect, which made the ghosts difficult to track and tired the players' eyes. The two further said that the effect diminishes the ghosts' personalities present in the arcade version. Chris Kohler of Wired commented that the game was poorly received upon its release and in contemporary times because of the poor quality. However, he further described the game as an impressive technical achievement given its console's limitations.

== Impact and legacy ==
Initially, the excitement generated by Pac-Man's home release prompted retail stores to expand their inventory to sell video games. Drugstores began stocking video game cartridges, and toy retailers vied for new releases. Kmart and JCPenney competed against Sears to become the largest vendor of video games. The game's release also led to an increase in sales of the Atari 2600 console.

In retrospect, however, critics often cite Atari's Pac-Man as a major factor in the drop of consumer confidence in the company, which contributed to the video game crash of 1983. Bill Loguidice and Matt Barton of Gamasutra stated that the game's poor quality damaged the company's reputation. Buchanan commented that it disappointed millions of fans and diminished confidence in Atari's games. Former Next Generation editor-in-chief Neil West attributes his longtime skepticism of Atari's quality to the disappointment he had from buying the game as a child. Calling the game the top video game disaster, Buchanan credits Pac-Man as a factor to the downfall of Atari and the industry in the 1980s. Author Steven Kent also blames the game, along with Atari's E.T. the Extra-Terrestrial, for severely damaging the company's reputation and profitability. Montfort and Bogost stated that the game's negative reception seeded mistrust in retailers, which was reinforced by later factors that culminated in the crash.

On December 7, 1982, Atari owner Warner Communications announced that revenue forecasts for 1982 were cut from a 50% increase over 1981 to a 15% increase. Immediately following the announcement, the company's stock value dropped by around 35%—from $54 to $35—amounting to a loss of $1.3 billion in the company's market valuation. Warner admitted that Pac-Man's good sales despite poor quality made Atari overconfident about E.T. and Raiders of the Lost Ark, which did not sell well. In 1983, the company decreased its workforce by 30% and lost $356 million.

In late 1982, Atari ported Pac-Man to its new console, the Atari 5200. This version was a more accurate conversion of the original arcade game and was a launch title for the console, along with eleven other games. It was followed by conversions of Pac-Man's arcade sequels, Ms. Pac-Man and Jr. Pac-Man, for the Atari 2600. These used 8 KB ROM cartridges instead of Pac-Man's 4 KB and dispensed with two-player games. They were better received than Atari's first Pac-Man title and addressed many critics' complaints.

== See also ==
- List of video games notable for negative reception
