= M Network =

Video game division of Mattel

- Industry: Video games
- Founded: 1982; 44 years ago
- Defunct: 1983; 43 years ago
- Fate: Defunct
- Owner: Mattel
- Parent: Mattel Electronics

M Network was the brand name used by Mattel Electronics in 1982 and 1983, to publish video games for the Atari 2600, IBM PC, and Apple II.

== History ==
In the early 1980s, Mattel's Intellivision video game console was a direct competitor to Atari's Video Computer System (VCS), better known as the Atari 2600. Although Mattel designed and produced video game cartridges for their own system, the company surprised the industry by also releasing simplified versions of its games for the 2600 under the M Network label. "There will be between 8 and 11 million Atari units in the marketplace by Christmas", a Mattel executive said in 1982. "Why shouldn't we make software for a hardware base like that?"

M Network produced home ports of popular arcade games, including BurgerTime, Bump 'n' Jump and Lock 'n' Chase (all 1982), as well as original titles such as Tron: Deadly Discs (1982 – based on the Disney movie) and Kool-Aid Man (1983), one of the earliest "promogames", originally available only via mail order by sending in UPC symbols from Kool-Aid containers.

Mattel programmers (named by TV Guide as the "Blue Sky Rangers") were also encouraged to develop video game tie-ins with other Mattel properties; games such as Masters of the Universe: The Power of He-Man (1983), leveraging Mattel's Masters of the Universe media franchise, were released.

M Network released 2600 software four to six months after the Intellivision original. Its 2600 cartridges were physically similar to Intellivision cartridges, but with a base designed to fit the 2600's larger cartridge slot. Most of the names were changed for the 2600 version; Astrosmash was, for example, renamed Astroblast.

Although Mattel, through M Network, released cartridges for Atari consoles, they balked at allowing Atari to release cartridges for the Intellivision: in the early 1980s, the company filed a lawsuit against Atari, alleging that Atari had stolen Mattel's trade secrets when it hired former Mattel employees to develop a line of Intellivision-compatible cartridges. Atari published software for non-Atari hardware with the Atarisoft label.

In May 2023, Atari SA obtained rights for over a dozen M Network games, including Armor Ambush, Astroblast, and Star Strike. A selection of M Network games were announced for release in October 2024 as downloadable content for the Atari 50 (2022) video game compilation.
