= Atari 50 =

2022 video game compilation

Atari 50: The Anniversary Celebration
- Developer: Digital Eclipse
- Publisher: Atari
- Producers: Drew Scanlon; Bao Calvin Vu
- Composer: Bob Baffy
- Platforms: Atari VCS, Nintendo Switch, PlayStation 4, PlayStation 5, Windows, Xbox One, Xbox Series X/S
- Release: November 11, 2022
- Modes: Single-player, multiplayer

Atari 50: The Anniversary Celebration is a 2022 video game compilation and interactive documentary developed by Digital Eclipse and published by Atari to commemorate the 50th anniversary of Atari, Inc. It is composed of newly shot interviews with former Atari employees, archival footage, emulated games from the company's catalog, and six new games inspired by various Atari games. It was released for the Atari VCS, Nintendo Switch, PlayStation 4, PlayStation 5, Windows, Xbox One, and Xbox Series X/S on November 11, 2022.

The game is presented as a five-part interactive timeline that lays out the history of the company and its products through video, scanned artifacts and related games. It received generally favorable reviews, with critics comparing it favorably to a museum or traditional documentary. They praised its thoroughness and hoped other developers would receive a similar treatment.

Since its release, Digital Eclipse has added additional games as free updates and paid downloadable content, later compiled into Atari 50: The Anniversary Celebration Expanded Edition. The success of the game led Digital Eclipse to develop additional documentary-style game compilations, known as the Gold Master Series.

== Content ==
Atari 50 compiles over 100 video games made for arcades, standalone handhelds, and game consoles, specifically Atari 2600, Atari 5200, Atari 8-bit computers, Atari 7800, Atari Lynx and Atari Jaguar. Each of the original games is given a single save state. Controls can be remapped, and a CRT-like filter can be enabled, while bezels recreate art and fill out the wide screen. Some games feature further enhancements, such as Star Raiders, which has overlays that show player status and rumble effects when entering hyperspace.

Six new "Atari Reimagined" games were created for the collection by Digital Eclipse staff. These games are updated versions of Atari's games, such as Yars' Revenge Reimagined, which reuses the code of Yars' Revenge with more special effects and audio, while VCTR-SCTR is a completely new game inspired by vector graphics games like Asteroids, Lunar Lander, Battlezone, Speed Freak, and Tempest.

The game has an interactive timeline presenting the history of Atari. It is split into five categories: "Arcade Origins", "Birth of the Console", "Highs and Lows", "The Dawn of PCs", and "The 1990s and Beyond". It covers Atari's origin in the 1970s, its first home console released in the 1970s, Atari just before and after the video game crash of 1983, its home computer line and its console releases in the 1990s.

The timeline includes archival material such as design documents, game manuals, context for games, contemporary quotes and video interviews with game creators. Atari employees and former employees are interviewed in the collection, including Allan Alcorn, Owen Rubin, David Crane, Jerry Jessop, Bill Rehbock, Tod Frye, Eugene Jarvis, Howard Scott Warshaw, Nolan Bushnell and Wade Rosen, as well as other members of the game industry such as Cliff Bleszinski, Tim Schafer, and Ed Fries. The games included can also be browsed through a list as in most retro collections.

== Development ==
Atari 50 features an interactive timeline (pictured) which presents text, images, video footage and playable games to form a narrative of the history of Atari.

The game's editorial director, Chris Kohler, joined Digital Eclipse in July 2020, following the departure of Frank Cifaldi. The team were working on a re-release of Jordan Mechner's Karateka (1984), which Kohler described as being in a "different sort of prototype and in a different sort of state" than what would become The Making of Karateka (2023). Kohler went through Mechner's journals he kept while in college, discovering that the material could be used to chronologically tell the history of game's development. He wanted to place the game's history in a timeline, showcasing earlier games developed by the creator and prototypes of the game that would lead to its final form. While developing The Making of Karateka, Digital Eclipse were called upon to develop the Atari 50 compilation. As they had been already making an interactive documentary for The Making of Karateka, they applied what they had developed into Atari 50. The full title Atari 50: The Anniversary Celebration references the company's 50th anniversary. Stephen Frost, producer of Atari 50, found that as there had been several compilations of Atari games, it was important to expand on the concept in a new release that would give the story of the company and how their hardware influenced both the arcade and video game industries. This led Digital Eclipse to apply the interactive timeline which presents text, images, video footage and playable games to form a narrative. The engineers at Digital Eclipse built a system that allowed them to add material in a timeline without extensive programming.

Some games could not be included with the release as Atari no longer had the rights to them, such as the arcade games Marble Madness (1984), S.T.U.N. Runner (1989), and San Francisco Rush: Extreme Racing (1996), the rights to which belonged to Warner Bros. following the bankruptcy of Midway, which had previously had the rights to Atari Games. Other games that were not included were attached to other licenses, such as the arcade game Star Wars (1983), the Atari Jaguar game Alien vs Predator (1994), and the Atari 2600 game Raiders of the Lost Ark (1982). Frost explained that processes were started on getting permission to include certain titles and art assets for other games, which was allowed for games like Yoomp!. Some initial work was made on an emulator for the Atari ST line of computers, but halted when Frost concluded that there were not enough resources to complete the emulator to the quality required.

Programmer Dave Rees said that a few games for the Atari 2600 required unique emulation. These included Secret Quest, which uses the switch to display a code-entry status screen. This game required unique code to get it to toggle with a press of a button. Rich Whitehouse created the Atari Jaguar emulator and found it particularly challenging. Whitehouse stated that there was not a lot of documentation for the system's hardware, and what documentation did exist had inaccuracies or was missing information. Whitehouse stated that getting the system to run smoothly on the Nintendo Switch "ended up being its own challenge."

Digital Eclipse created new games for the compilation based on Atari properties and individual members' interests and expertise. These six new games are under the Atari Reimagined label. These are Haunted Houses, Neo Breakout, Quadratank, Swordquest: AirWorld, VCTR-SCTR (pronounced "Vector Sector") and Yars' Revenge Reimagined. Swordquest: AirWorld was developed by Dave Rees as an attempt to make a final game in the Swordquest series of games. He consulted Tod Frye, who worked on developing the game in the 1980s, on what the new version would be like. Yars' Revenge Reimainged was developed by Mike Mika. The game adds more effects and audio to the original game. VCTR-SCTR is a completely new game, inspired by vector graphics, by Jeremy Williams. Williams wrote his own software renderer that let him model vertices in a 3D space and connect them to form wireframes. Haunted House was also developed by Rees and featured 3D and voxel-based graphics. Neo-Breakout and Quadratank were developed by Jason Cirillo and Mika respectively.

Digital Eclipse gathered video footage from The Strong, the National Videogame Museum and the Museum of Videogame Art and private collectors to include in the release. Kohler, said that there was no shortage of footage to draw from, but that they had to whittle the content down to what was important for the narrative. All archival footage is captured from original sources. Commercials for Atari were provided by Hans Reutter, including a film scan of an Atari theatrical advertisement.

=== Downloadable content ===
On October 31, 2023, Atari announced that they would acquire Digital Eclipse. The deal was closed by November 6. A free update to the collection was subsequently released on December 5, 2023, adding twelve games, including Bowling, Circus Atari, Double Dunk, Maze Craze, Miniature Golf, MotoRodeo, Super Football, and Warbirds, as well as two unreleased prototypes (Aquaventure and Save Mary), and two homebrew 2600 games (Adventure II and Return to Haunted House).

Following Atari's acquisition of the Intellivision brand, Atari 50: The Anniversary Celebration Expanded Edition was announced on June 24, 2024. This version adds two new timelines: "The Wider World of Atari", which contains 19 additional games, a spotlight on Atari logo inker Evelyn Seto, and archival and contemporary interviews with employees, fans and homebrew developers; "The First Console War" focuses on the rivalry between the Atari 2600 and Mattel's Intellivision, and includes new documentary videos and a further 19 additional games. The former was released digitally on September 26, 2024, with the latter arriving on November 8, alongside a physical edition for PlayStation 5 and Nintendo Switch.

The games added in "The Wider World of Atari" are: Berzerk, Frenzy, Red Baron, Sky Diver, Avalanche, Destroyer, Super Bug, Football, Stellar Track, Submarine Commander, Steeplechase, Atari Video Cube, Desert Falcon (2600) and Off the Wall; The games added in "The First Console War" are: Air Raiders, Armor Ambush, Astroblast, Basketball, Frogs and Flies, International Soccer, Dark Cavern, Star Strike, Super Challenge Baseball, Super Challenge Football, Video Pinball, Antbear, Swordfight, Sea Battle, Tower of Mystery, HardBall!, Xari Arena, Final Legacy, Desert Falcon (7800).

A third downloadable timeline, "The Namco Legendary Pack", was announced on July 21, 2025, as a partnership with Bandai Namco Entertainment. The pack adds multiple versions of Pac-Man, Dig Dug, Galaxian, Galaga, and Xevious, along with new documentary footage detailing the relationship between Atari and Namco. It was released on November 13.

== List of games ==
There are 115 games available in the collection, plus an additional 52 available via downloadable content.

Games in the collection
Title	Arcade	2600	8-bit computers	5200	7800	Lynx	Jaguar	Other	Note
3D Tic-Tac-Toe	—N/a	Yes	—N/a	—N/a	—N/a	—N/a	—N/a	—N/a	
Adventure	—N/a	Yes	—N/a	—N/a	—N/a	—N/a	—N/a	—N/a	
Adventure II	—N/a	Yes	—N/a	—N/a	—N/a	—N/a	—N/a	—N/a	Aftermarket Homebrew game
Air Raiders	—N/a	Yes	—N/a	—N/a	—N/a	—N/a	—N/a	—N/a	Included in "The First Console War" DLC and "Expanded Edition" release
Air-Sea Battle	—N/a	Yes	—N/a	—N/a	—N/a	—N/a	—N/a	—N/a	
Antbear	—N/a	Yes	—N/a	—N/a	—N/a	—N/a	—N/a	—N/a	Unreleased Atari 2600 prototype. Included in "The First Console War" DLC and "Expanded Edition" release
Akka Arrh	Yes	—N/a	—N/a	—N/a	—N/a	—N/a	—N/a	—N/a	Unreleased arcade prototype
Aquaventure	—N/a	Yes	—N/a	—N/a	—N/a	—N/a	—N/a	—N/a	Unreleased Atari 2600 prototype
Armor Ambush	—N/a	Yes	—N/a	—N/a	—N/a	—N/a	—N/a	—N/a	Included in "The First Console War" DLC and "Expanded Edition" release
Asteroids	Yes	Yes	—N/a	—N/a	Yes	—N/a	—N/a	—N/a	
Asteroids Deluxe	Yes	—N/a	—N/a	—N/a	—N/a	—N/a	—N/a	—N/a	
Astroblast	—N/a	Yes	—N/a	—N/a	—N/a	—N/a	—N/a	—N/a	Included in "The First Console War" DLC and "Expanded Edition" release
Atari Karts	—N/a	—N/a	—N/a	—N/a	—N/a	—N/a	Yes	—N/a	
Atari Video Cube	—N/a	Yes	—N/a	—N/a	—N/a	—N/a	—N/a	—N/a	Included in "The Wider World of Atari" DLC and "Expanded Edition" release
Avalanche	Yes	—N/a	Yes	—N/a	—N/a	—N/a	—N/a	—N/a	Included in "The Wider World of Atari" DLC and "Expanded Edition" release
Basic Math	—N/a	Yes	—N/a	—N/a	—N/a	—N/a	—N/a	—N/a	
Basketball	—N/a	Yes	—N/a	—N/a	—N/a	—N/a	—N/a	—N/a	Included in "The First Console War" DLC and "Expanded Edition" release
Basketbrawl	—N/a	—N/a	—N/a	—N/a	Yes	Yes	—N/a	—N/a	
Berzerk	Yes	Yes (Note: Two versions of Berzerk for the Atari 2600—the original release and the "Voice Enhanced" version.)	—N/a	Yes	—N/a	—N/a	—N/a	—N/a	Included in "The Wider World of Atari" DLC and "Expanded Edition" release
Black Widow	Yes	—N/a	—N/a	—N/a	—N/a	—N/a	—N/a	—N/a	
Bounty Bob Strikes Back!	—N/a	—N/a	Yes	Yes	—N/a	—N/a	—N/a	—N/a	
Bowling	—N/a	Yes	—N/a	—N/a	—N/a	—N/a	—N/a	—N/a	
Breakout	Yes	Yes	—N/a	—N/a	—N/a	—N/a	—N/a	—N/a	
Canyon Bomber	—N/a	Yes	—N/a	—N/a	—N/a	—N/a	—N/a	—N/a	
Caverns of Mars	—N/a	—N/a	Yes	—N/a	—N/a	—N/a	—N/a	—N/a	
Centipede	Yes	Yes	—N/a	—N/a	Yes	—N/a	—N/a	—N/a	
Circus Atari	—N/a	Yes	—N/a	—N/a	—N/a	—N/a	—N/a	—N/a	
Cloak & Dagger	Yes	—N/a	—N/a	—N/a	—N/a	—N/a	—N/a	—N/a	
Club Drive	—N/a	—N/a	—N/a	—N/a	—N/a	—N/a	Yes	—N/a	
Combat	—N/a	Yes	—N/a	—N/a	—N/a	—N/a	—N/a	—N/a	
Combat Two	—N/a	Yes	—N/a	—N/a	—N/a	—N/a	—N/a	—N/a	Unreleased Atari 2600 prototype
Crystal Castles	Yes	Yes	—N/a	—N/a	—N/a	—N/a	—N/a	—N/a	
Cybermorph	—N/a	—N/a	—N/a	—N/a	—N/a	—N/a	Yes	—N/a	
Dark Cavern	—N/a	Yes	—N/a	—N/a	—N/a	—N/a	—N/a	—N/a	Included in "The First Console War" DLC and "Expanded Edition" release
Dark Chambers	—N/a	Yes	—N/a	—N/a	Yes	—N/a	—N/a	—N/a	
Demons to Diamonds	—N/a	Yes	—N/a	—N/a	—N/a	—N/a	—N/a	—N/a	
Desert Falcon	—N/a	Yes	—N/a	—N/a	Yes	—N/a	—N/a	—N/a	Included in "The Wider World of Atari" & "The First Console War" DLC and "Expanded Edition" release
Destroyer	Yes	—N/a	—N/a	—N/a	—N/a	—N/a	—N/a	—N/a	Included in "The Wider World of Atari" DLC and "Expanded Edition" release
Dig Dug	Yes	Yes	Yes	Yes	Yes	—N/a	—N/a	—N/a	Included in "The Namco Legendary Pack" DLC
Dodge 'Em	—N/a	Yes	—N/a	—N/a	—N/a	—N/a	—N/a	—N/a	
Double Dunk	—N/a	Yes	—N/a	—N/a	—N/a	—N/a	—N/a	—N/a	
Evolution: Dino Dudes	—N/a	—N/a	—N/a	—N/a	—N/a	—N/a	Yes	—N/a	
Fatal Run	—N/a	Yes	—N/a	—N/a	Yes	—N/a	—N/a	—N/a	
Fight for Life	—N/a	—N/a	—N/a	—N/a	—N/a	—N/a	Yes	—N/a	
Final Legacy	—N/a	—N/a	—N/a	Yes	—N/a	—N/a	—N/a	—N/a	Unreleased Atari 5200 prototype. Included in "The First Console War" DLC and "Expanded Edition" release
Fire Truck	Yes	—N/a	—N/a	—N/a	—N/a	—N/a	—N/a	—N/a	
Food Fight	Yes	—N/a	Yes	—N/a	—N/a	—N/a	—N/a	—N/a	
Football	Yes	—N/a	—N/a	—N/a	—N/a	—N/a	—N/a	—N/a	Included in "The Wider World of Atari" DLC and "Expanded Edition" release
Frenzy	Yes	—N/a	—N/a	—N/a	—N/a	—N/a	—N/a	—N/a	Included in "The Wider World of Atari" DLC and "Expanded Edition" release
Frogs and Flies	—N/a	Yes	—N/a	—N/a	—N/a	—N/a	—N/a	—N/a	Included in "The First Console War" DLC and "Expanded Edition" release
Galaga	—N/a	—N/a	—N/a	—N/a	Yes	—N/a	—N/a	—N/a	Included in "The Namco Legendary Pack" DLC
Galaxian	—N/a	Yes	Yes	Yes	—N/a	—N/a	—N/a	—N/a	Included in "The Namco Legendary Pack" DLC
Gravitar	Yes	Yes	—N/a	—N/a	—N/a	—N/a	—N/a	—N/a	
HardBall!	—N/a	—N/a	Yes	—N/a	—N/a	—N/a	—N/a	—N/a	Included in "The First Console War" DLC and "Expanded Edition" release
Haunted House	—N/a	Yes	—N/a	—N/a	—N/a	—N/a	—N/a	—N/a	
Haunted Houses	—N/a	—N/a	—N/a	—N/a	—N/a	—N/a	—N/a	Yes	Atari Reimagined game
I, Robot	Yes	—N/a	—N/a	—N/a	—N/a	—N/a	—N/a	—N/a	
International Soccer	—N/a	Yes	—N/a	—N/a	—N/a	—N/a	—N/a	—N/a	Included in "The First Console War" DLC and "Expanded Edition" release
Liberator	Yes	—N/a	—N/a	—N/a	—N/a	—N/a	—N/a	—N/a	
Lunar Lander	Yes	—N/a	—N/a	—N/a	—N/a	—N/a	—N/a	—N/a	
Major Havoc	Yes	—N/a	—N/a	—N/a	—N/a	—N/a	—N/a	—N/a	
Malibu Bikini Volleyball	—N/a	—N/a	—N/a	—N/a	—N/a	Yes	—N/a	—N/a	
Maze Craze	—N/a	Yes	—N/a	—N/a	—N/a	—N/a	—N/a	—N/a	
Maze Invaders	Yes	—N/a	—N/a	—N/a	—N/a	—N/a	—N/a	—N/a	Unreleased arcade prototype
Millipede	Yes	Yes	—N/a	Yes	—N/a	—N/a	—N/a	—N/a	Unreleased Atari 5200 prototype
Miner 2049er	—N/a	Yes	Yes	—N/a	—N/a	—N/a	—N/a	—N/a	
Miniature Golf	—N/a	Yes	—N/a	—N/a	—N/a	—N/a	—N/a	—N/a	
Missile Command	Yes	Yes	—N/a	Yes	—N/a	—N/a	—N/a	—N/a	
Missile Command 3D	—N/a	—N/a	—N/a	—N/a	—N/a	—N/a	Yes	—N/a	
MotoRodeo	—N/a	Yes	—N/a	—N/a	—N/a	—N/a	—N/a	—N/a	
Neo Breakout	—N/a	—N/a	—N/a	—N/a	—N/a	—N/a	—N/a	Yes	Atari Reimagined game
Ninja Golf	—N/a	—N/a	—N/a	—N/a	Yes	—N/a	—N/a	—N/a	
Off the Wall	—N/a	Yes	—N/a	—N/a	—N/a	—N/a	—N/a	—N/a	Included in "The Wider World of Atari" DLC and "Expanded Edition" release
Outlaw	—N/a	Yes	—N/a	—N/a	—N/a	—N/a	—N/a	—N/a	
Pac-Man	—N/a	Yes	—N/a	—N/a	—N/a	—N/a	—N/a	—N/a	Included in "The Namco Legendary Pack" DLC
Pac-Man	—N/a	—N/a	Yes	Yes	—N/a	—N/a	—N/a	—N/a	Included in "The Namco Legendary Pack" DLC
Pong	Yes	—N/a	—N/a	—N/a	—N/a	—N/a	—N/a	—N/a	
Quadratank	—N/a	—N/a	—N/a	—N/a	—N/a	—N/a	—N/a	Yes	Atari Reimagined game
Quadrun	—N/a	Yes	—N/a	—N/a	—N/a	—N/a	—N/a	—N/a	
Quantum	Yes	—N/a	—N/a	—N/a	—N/a	—N/a	—N/a	—N/a	
Race 500	—N/a	Yes	—N/a	—N/a	—N/a	—N/a	—N/a	—N/a	
RealSports Baseball	—N/a	Yes	—N/a	—N/a	—N/a	—N/a	—N/a	—N/a	
RealSports Basketball	—N/a	Yes	—N/a	—N/a	—N/a	—N/a	—N/a	—N/a	Unreleased Atari 2600 prototype
RealSports Boxing	—N/a	Yes	—N/a	—N/a	—N/a	—N/a	—N/a	—N/a	
RealSports Football	—N/a	Yes	—N/a	—N/a	—N/a	—N/a	—N/a	—N/a	
RealSports Soccer	—N/a	Yes	—N/a	—N/a	—N/a	—N/a	—N/a	—N/a	
RealSports Tennis	—N/a	Yes	—N/a	—N/a	—N/a	—N/a	—N/a	—N/a	
RealSports Volleyball	—N/a	Yes	—N/a	—N/a	—N/a	—N/a	—N/a	—N/a	
Red Baron	Yes	—N/a	—N/a	—N/a	—N/a	—N/a	—N/a	—N/a	Included in "The Wider World of Atari" DLC and "Expanded Edition" release
Ruiner Pinball	—N/a	—N/a	—N/a	—N/a	—N/a	—N/a	Yes	—N/a	
Return to Haunted House	—N/a	Yes	—N/a	—N/a	—N/a	—N/a	—N/a	—N/a	Aftermarket Homebrew game
Saboteur	—N/a	Yes	—N/a	—N/a	—N/a	—N/a	—N/a	—N/a	Unreleased Atari 2600 prototype
Save Mary	—N/a	Yes	—N/a	—N/a	—N/a	—N/a	—N/a	—N/a	Unreleased Atari 2600 prototype
Scrapyard Dog	—N/a	—N/a	—N/a	—N/a	Yes	Yes	—N/a	—N/a	
Sea Battle	—N/a	Yes	—N/a	—N/a	—N/a	—N/a	—N/a	—N/a	Unreleased Atari 2600 prototype. Included in "The First Console War" DLC and "Expanded Edition" release
Secret Quest	—N/a	Yes	—N/a	—N/a	—N/a	—N/a	—N/a	—N/a	
Sky Diver	Yes	Yes	—N/a	—N/a	—N/a	—N/a	—N/a	—N/a	Included in "The Wider World of Atari" DLC and "Expanded Edition" release
Solaris	—N/a	Yes	—N/a	—N/a	—N/a	—N/a	—N/a	—N/a	
Space Duel	Yes	—N/a	—N/a	—N/a	—N/a	—N/a	—N/a	—N/a	
Sprint 8	Yes	—N/a	—N/a	—N/a	—N/a	—N/a	—N/a	—N/a	
Star Raiders	—N/a	—N/a	—N/a	Yes	—N/a	—N/a	—N/a	—N/a	
Star Strike	—N/a	Yes	—N/a	—N/a	—N/a	—N/a	—N/a	—N/a	Included in "The First Console War" DLC and "Expanded Edition" release
Steeplechase	—N/a	Yes	—N/a	—N/a	—N/a	—N/a	—N/a	—N/a	Included in "The Wider World of Atari" DLC and "Expanded Edition" release
Stellar Track	—N/a	Yes	—N/a	—N/a	—N/a	—N/a	—N/a	—N/a	Included in "The Wider World of Atari" DLC and "Expanded Edition" release
Submarine Commander	—N/a	Yes	—N/a	—N/a	—N/a	—N/a	—N/a	—N/a	Included in "The Wider World of Atari" DLC and "Expanded Edition" release
Super Asteroids & Missile Command	—N/a	—N/a	—N/a	—N/a	—N/a	Yes	—N/a	—N/a	
Super Breakout	Yes	Yes	—N/a	Yes	—N/a	—N/a	—N/a	—N/a	
Super Bug	Yes	—N/a	—N/a	—N/a	—N/a	—N/a	—N/a	—N/a	Included in "The Wider World of Atari" DLC and "Expanded Edition" release
Super Challenge Baseball	—N/a	Yes	—N/a	—N/a	—N/a	—N/a	—N/a	—N/a	Included in "The First Console War" DLC and "Expanded Edition" release
Super Challenge Football	—N/a	Yes	—N/a	—N/a	—N/a	—N/a	—N/a	—N/a	Included in "The First Console War" DLC and "Expanded Edition" release
Super Football	—N/a	Yes	—N/a	—N/a	—N/a	—N/a	—N/a	—N/a	
Surround	—N/a	Yes	—N/a	—N/a	—N/a	—N/a	—N/a	—N/a	
Swordfight	—N/a	Yes	—N/a	—N/a	—N/a	—N/a	—N/a	—N/a	Unreleased Atari 2600 prototype. Included in "The First Console War" DLC and "Expanded Edition" release
Swordquest: Airworld	—N/a	—N/a	—N/a	—N/a	—N/a	—N/a	—N/a	Yes	Atari Reimagined game
Swordquest: Earthworld	—N/a	Yes	—N/a	—N/a	—N/a	—N/a	—N/a	—N/a	
Swordquest: Fireworld	—N/a	Yes	—N/a	—N/a	—N/a	—N/a	—N/a	—N/a	
Swordquest: Waterworld	—N/a	Yes	—N/a	—N/a	—N/a	—N/a	—N/a	—N/a	
Tempest	Yes	—N/a	—N/a	—N/a	—N/a	—N/a	—N/a	—N/a	
Tempest 2000	—N/a	—N/a	—N/a	—N/a	—N/a	—N/a	Yes	—N/a	
Touch Me	—N/a	—N/a	—N/a	—N/a	—N/a	—N/a	—N/a	Yes	Digital reproduction of stand-alone LED handheld
Tower of Mystery	—N/a	Yes	—N/a	—N/a	—N/a	—N/a	—N/a	—N/a	Unreleased Atari 2600 prototype. Included in "The First Console War" DLC and "Expanded Edition" release
Trevor McFur in the Crescent Galaxy	—N/a	—N/a	—N/a	—N/a	—N/a	—N/a	Yes	—N/a	
Turbo Sub	—N/a	—N/a	—N/a	—N/a	—N/a	Yes	—N/a	—N/a	
VCTR-SCTR	—N/a	—N/a	—N/a	—N/a	—N/a	—N/a	—N/a	Yes	Atari Reimagined game
Video Pinball	—N/a	Yes	—N/a	—N/a	—N/a	—N/a	—N/a	—N/a	Included in "The First Console War" DLC and "Expanded Edition" release
Warbirds	—N/a	—N/a	—N/a	—N/a	—N/a	Yes	—N/a	—N/a	
Warlords	Yes	Yes	—N/a	—N/a	—N/a	—N/a	—N/a	—N/a	
Xari Arena	—N/a	—N/a	Yes	—N/a	—N/a	—N/a	—N/a	—N/a	Unreleased Atari 5200 prototype Included in "The First Console War" DLC and "Expanded Edition" release
Xevious	Yes	—N/a	—N/a	—N/a	Yes	—N/a	—N/a	—N/a	Included in "The Namco Legendary Pack" DLC
Yars' Revenge	—N/a	Yes	—N/a	—N/a	—N/a	—N/a	—N/a	—N/a	
Yars' Revenge Enhanced	—N/a	—N/a	—N/a	—N/a	—N/a	—N/a	—N/a	Yes	Atari Reimagined game
Yoomp!	—N/a	—N/a	Yes	—N/a	—N/a	—N/a	—N/a	—N/a	Aftermarket Homebrew game

== Reception ==
Reception

Aggregate score
Aggregator	Score			
Aggregator	NS	PC	PS5	Xbox Series X/S
Metacritic	89/100	82/100	86/100	87/100

Review scores
Publication	Score			
Publication	NS	PC	PS5	Xbox Series X/S
Game Informer	9/10	N/A	N/A	N/A
IGN	9/10	N/A	N/A	8.5/10
Nintendo Life	8/10	N/A	N/A	N/A
Nintendo World Report	9.5/10	N/A	N/A	N/A
Push Square	N/A	N/A	8/10	N/A
Retro Gamer	90%	N/A	N/A	N/A
The Games Machine (Italy)	N/A	8/10	N/A	N/A
TouchArcade	5/5	N/A	N/A	N/A
Siliconera	N/A	N/A	8/10	N/A

Atari 50 was released on November 11, 2022, on the Atari VCS, PlayStation 4, PlayStation 5, Windows, Xbox One, and Xbox Series X/S. It garnered "generally favorable reviews", according to review aggregator site Metacritic.

Critics complimented the release's timeline structure, with Sammy Barker of Push Square proclaiming the timeline to be introspective and interesting, and that Atari's history was shown as a "warts and all perspective, which is appreciated". Andrew Webster of The Verge echoed this, stating that without the timeline structure he would have played these games "for a few minutes and then moved on; with it, I'm much more invested in understanding what they are and how they fit into gaming history, and I know what to look for when I dive in." Samuel Claiborn of IGN desired that more people be involved in the documentaries, such as the prominent women developers, Atari's art and marketing departments as well as decades of journalists, historians and collectors, saying this could have added further context.

Many reviewers commented that many of the games included have not aged well. A reviewer in Edge highlighted the arcade releases as having both quantity and quality, and said the Atari 2600 games have held up less well and that the selection of Lynx and Jaguar games were mostly curiosities. Shaun Musgrave of TouchArcade expanded that "not every game here is good, of course. But there's something interesting about each of them. Even the familiar old arcade and 2600 games that have been endlessly re-released can be appreciated a little more with the extra info attached in this collection." Nick Thorpe of Retro Gamer echoed this, saying that the content was elevated by contextualizing its place in Atari history. Webster complimented the variations on games, allowing audiences to compare games like Dark Chambers and Scrapyard Dog on different systems.

Claiborn found that some games had better ways to be played due the nature of the original hardware, such as Centipede's trackball, Tempest's spinner controls, and the Atari 7800 and Jaguar controllers, but found that games for the Atari 2600 controlled better due the quality of the original system's control stick. Edge magazine, Barker, Massey, Musgrave and Thorpe lamented some historically important games missing, such as Computer Space (1971), Firefox (1984), one of the first Laserdisc-driven arcade games, E.T. the Extra-Terrestrial (1982) or any games for Atari ST computers. Graham Russel of Siliconera commented that the release lacked any discussion of Atari's history or products released between 1998 and 2020, such as the Atari Flashback series.

Webster said Atari 50 was among the best compilation video game titles released. Massey compared the compilation to Capcom Arcade Stadium (2021), finding that the title "comes with pretty 3D-rendered gimmickry that resembles an actual arcade, but lacks the internal warmth exuded [on Atari 50]." Jason Fanelli of Game Informer and Thorpe wrote that it had set a new standard for historical video game compilations.

== Legacy ==
In 2023, Digital Eclipse announced they would adapt the historical timeline format used in Atari 50 into other projects, under the Gold Master Series branding. Kohler stated that the audience immediately picked up the idea of going through a timeline within Atari 50 and following the history, which gave the team at Digital Eclipse the confidence to continue with the format. The first Gold Master Series release was The Making of Karateka (2023), which chronicled the history of Karateka (1984), followed by Llamasoft: The Jeff Minter Story (2024) and Tetris Forever (2024).

== See also ==
- Atari Recharged
- List of Atari arcade games
- List of Atari, Inc. games (1972–1984)
