= Baseball (disambiguation) =

Baseball is a bat-and-ball sport played between two teams, usually of 25 players each.

Baseball may also refer to:

== Games and sports ==
- Baseball (ball), the ball used in baseball
- British baseball, game played in a few parts of Britain
- Vintage base ball, a sport using 19th-century baseball rules
- Baseball (card game), a card game published by Ed-U-Cards
- Baseball (drinking game), a game using ping-pong balls and cups of beer
- Baseball (poker), a variety of stud poker
- Baseball (1971 video game), a mainframe computer game
- Baseball, a 1977 video game for RCA Studio II
- Baseball!, a 1978 video game for the Magnavox Odyssey²
- Baseball (Intellivision video game), from 1980
- Baseball (1983 video game), a video game by Nintendo
- Home Run (video game), or Baseball, a 1978 game for the Atari 2600
- RealSports Baseball, or simply Baseball, a 1983 game for the Atari 2600 and other Atari platforms
- Pesäpallo, a variation of baseball played in Finland

== Music ==
- Baseball (band), an independent band from Melbourne, Australia
- The Baseballs, a German rockabilly band
- Baseball: An Album by Sayanything, a 2001 album by Say Anything

== Other uses ==
- Baseball (TV series), a 1994 documentary series by Ken Burns
- Baseball (bomb), an unsuccessful type of bouncing bomb, intended for use by Royal Navy attack boats in place of torpedoes
- "Baseball" (Drop the Dead Donkey), a 1991 television episode
- "Baseball" (Veep), a 2012 television episode
- Baseball steak, a center cut of beef taken from the top sirloin cap steak
- Jiggy "Baseball" Cruz, a character in the British comic book series MPH
- "Who's on First?", or "Baseball", an Abbott and Costello comedy routine

== See also ==
- Category:Baseball
