= Submarine Commander (1982 video game) =

1982 video game

- Developer: Atari, Inc.
- Publisher: Sears
- Programmer: Matthew Hubbard
- Platform: Atari 2600
- Release: September 1982
- Genre: Shoot 'em up
- Modes: Single-player, multiplayer

Submarine Commander on Atari 2600

Submarine Commander is a 1982 first-person shooter video game developed by Atari, Inc. and published by Sears for the Atari 2600. It was one of the few games to be released only by Sears' Tele-Games label.

== Gameplay ==
The player controls a submarine going through enemy territory, and must shoot targets in order to win the game. The player views the action at a first-person perspective via a periscope that can be rotated 360 degrees, a rarity for the time. Information provided to the player includes a radar scope, a depth charge detector, a fuel gauge, and an engine temperature gauge for detecting engine overheating. There are eight modes of play, made up of single and two-player mode and four different levels of difficulty for each.

== Development ==
The game was one of three 2600 titles developed by Atari exclusively for Sears, the others being Stellar Track and a port of the arcade game Steeplechase. Submarine Commander was based on the 1978 Midway arcade game Sea Wolf II, which was played with a periscope.

== Reception ==
A December 1982 review in Joystik magazine described Submarine Commander as a "very basic shooting-gallery type game."

A retrospective review at 8-Bit Central said the game was "not a visually pleasing experience", but that it the complexity of the gameplay made it "worth playing". 8-Bit Central gave the game 2.5/5 overall. A December 2012 review on the Video Games Critic website called it "an eye-opening experience", praising its faux-3D graphics and action; the review gave the game an overall grade of "B+".
