= Baseball! =

1978 video game

- Developer: Magnavox
- Publishers: NA: Magnavox; PAL: Philips
- Platform: Odyssey²/Videopac
- Release: NA: September 1978; PAL: 1980
- Genre: Sports (Baseball)
- Mode: Multi-player

Baseball!, known in Europe as Videopac 8 - Baseball, is a 1978 baseball video game published by Magnavox and Philips for the Magnavox Odyssey², also known as the Philips Videopac G7000. It was a launch title for the system in North America. Contemporary critics considered it one of the better sports titles of its era and agreed it was better than Home Run for the Atari 2600 but not better than Major League Baseball for the Intellivision.

== Gameplay ==
Baseball! is a two-player simulation of the sport of baseball. When pitching, players can choose to curve their pitches resembling the difference between curveballs and fastballs in the original sport. The defending player can also control the three outfielding players before and after a pitch. If an outfielder catches the ball they can choose which base to throw it to, potentially netting an out. All runners advance through the bases simultaneously, limiting the strategy on offense. The game features a home run fence, fly balls, and a full team of nine players. The game also features a rendition of "Take Me Out to the Ballgame" at the beginning of a game.

== Reception ==
Reception

Review scores
Publication	Score
Electronic Fun with Computers & Games	D
Electronic Games 1983 Software Encyclopedia	8/10
Tilt	3/3

In 1980, Bill Kunkel and Arnie Katz wrote for "Arcade Alley", a column of Video, that Baseball! was "the closest thing to the national pastime ever offered to home video game enthusiasts." In 1981, the two authors writing for the New York Times said it had "aged well" thanks to its realistic gameplay and "attractive graphics". They thought it was better than Atari's Home Run but worse than Intellivision's Major League Baseball. The first issue of Electronic Games, edited by Kunkel and Katz, called it an "outstanding cartridge" and that it "balances out the key elements" of the sport. They thought it was "almost the equal of the best coin-op baseball machines."

Video Games magazine in 1983 called it "fairly easy to master, which tends to take away from the appeal for those desiring more sophisticated and complex action." Brett Weiss in Classic Home Video Games, 1972-1984: A Complete Reference Guide said it was "one of the better pre-Intellivision sports games. He thought it was better than Atari's Home Run in a number of different ways. George Sullivan in How to Win at Video Games: A Complete Guide simply called it "outstanding." In 1983, French magazine Tilt called it one of the best sports video games currently available.

== See also ==
- List of Magnavox Odyssey 2 games
