= Fight for Life (video game) =

1996 video game

- North American box art by Steve Lang
- Developer: Atari Corporation (Note: Motion-capture work by BioVision and artwork by High Voltage Software.)
- Publisher: Atari Corporation
- Producers: Bill Rehbock; Francois Yves Bertrand; J. Patton
- Designer: Francois Yves Bertrand
- Programmer: Francois Yves Bertrand
- Artists: Richard Ho; Silvio Porretta
- Composers: Hans-Martin Kröber; Joe Vitale; Nathan Brenholdt; Paul Foster
- Platform: Atari Jaguar
- Release: NA: January 15, 1996; EU: April 19, 1996
- Genre: Fighting
- Modes: Single-player, multiplayer

Fight for Life is a 1996 fighting video game developed and published by Atari Corporation in North America and Europe for the Atari Jaguar. It was the final game to be developed and published by Atari themselves before dropping support for the platform and merging with JT Storage in a reverse takeover on July 30, 1996, and the last fighting title released for the console. Set in a purgatory dimension known as the Specter Zone, Fight for Life follows eight deceased fighters as they enter a tournament held by a shapeshifting being called the Gatekeeper, who will bestow a second chance at life to the winner. Its gameplay consists of one-on-one fights, with a main eight-button configuration, featuring special moves and the ability to customize character's movesets, as well as four different playable modes.

Directed, designed and solely programmed by former Sega AM2 member Francois Yves Bertrand as Atari's answer to Virtua Fighter, Fight for Life started development in the second quarter of 1994 and had a troubled development cycle, undergoing various changes before its late release on the system. Fight for Life was met with negative reviews; while some praised the ability to customize the characters with stolen movesets from fighters, the slow pace and controls were widely seen as crippling flaws.

== Gameplay ==
Gameplay screenshot showcasing a match between Kimura and Jenny.

Fight for Life is a polygon-based fighting game similar to Virtua Fighter and Tekken, in which the player fights against opponents in one-on-one matches. The fighter who manages to deplete the health bar of the opponent wins the bout and the first to win two bouts in a best-of-3 match becomes the winner. Rounds are not timed.

Similarly to Battle Arena Toshinden, characters can maneuver in the 3D environments by sidestepping to avoid upcoming attacks, allowing them to move around in a counter-clockwise direction while still facing their opponent. Health bars are also not displayed during gameplay, instead, they are only shown once any of the characters have taken damage.

Unlike most fighting games of the time, players begin with very few special moves and by defeating opponents, they can "steal" two special moves from them and build their unique fighter. The game features four modes of play and two types of camera movement, in addition to supporting both the Jaguar's ProController and standard gamepad. In the easiest mode, players do not fight against the final boss.

== Synopsis ==
=== Plot ===
The Specter Zone is a purgatory dimension set between heaven and hell, which is overseen by a shape-shifting being only known as the Gatekeeper, who forms a tournament for his own amusement and will bestow a second chance at life to any of the eight deceased fighters, all of which died in 1995.

=== Characters ===
- Kimura: The son of a noble Japanese family, he was trained in the art of ninjitsu at the age of 4 by his father and remained undefeated until his death.
- Ian: The drifting son of a streetwalker, he was an active soldier before he went missing in action during an operation.
- Kara: A housewife who became obsessed with fighting against a shape-shifting being before getting committed to a psychiatric hospital and throwing herself from the top-floor of the building.
- Pog: An orphan who gained a reputation when working on docks before their closure and later being gunned down on a sidewalk.
- Mr. G: A professional boxer who lost a title match before being beaten to death by gangsters at a bar.
- Muhali: a Bedouin who was poisoned by one of his wives out of jealousy.
- Jenny: A travelling tomboy martial arts expert who was killed by surface-to-air missile during a trip in her plane.
- Lun: A kung-fu master who died when delivering a package containing an explosive.

== Production ==
=== Background ===
Francois Yves Bertrand developed his first video game, a text-based adventure game, for the TRS-80 while in high school period. Bertrand later purchased an Acorn Atom computer and developed for computers manufactured by Acorn Computers. Several years later, Bertrand joined French developer Sisteme and worked on titles from the label such as Ballarena and Erotictac. He would also later form his own game development company in France, Eterna, developing and publishing several titles for the Acorn line of home computers, such as Blaston.

While working for Sisteme, Bertrand began developing a new idea that involved controlling a computer program with a virtual camera system. Neither Bertrand nor Sisteme had the means to develop the technology, and Sisteme went out of business due to competition from Japanese developers.

Bertrand sent Sega of Japan a videotape showcasing the technology. Sega hired him to join AM2 as one of the first foreign members within the division, along with modeler and animator Jeff Buchanan. Under the helm of Yu Suzuki, he and Buchanan formed part of the original Virtua Fighter development team, with Bertrand being responsible for creating the camera and collision systems seen in the game. Bertrand would continue working along with Buchanan at Sega in further projects for almost two years before moving to the United States, where he would offer his services to both The 3DO Company and Atari Corporation, with the latter recruiting him to be part of the software development teams for the Jaguar, and becoming the sole lead programmer of Fight for Life.

Bertrand helped Silvio Porretta, whom he had met during an exchange of pirated games, to get a job at Atari, where he became the sole artist of Fight for Life.

=== Development ===
Most of the artwork was first hand-drawn sketches created by Porretta before being transposed to pixel art graphics.

Fight for Life entered into development in May 1994 and was handled by a small development team, with Francois Bertrand acting both as designer and director of the project, in addition of being its sole lead programmer. Besides the main team, the company BioVision assisted in its development process with their state-of-the-art motion capture system, which involved the filming of martial artists performing 250 moves with 25 reflective markers attached on determined parts of their bodies in order to record their movements that would allow characters to act in a realistic manner, with BioVision then converting the data into information that the Jaguar could read to display the actions, with Atari claiming that this process took place at 200 frames per second. High Voltage Software also assisted in the development of the game by creating artwork as well, although they were not credited as such in neither the manual nor in the in-game credits. Although Studio Gigante co-founder Richard Ho acted as the art director of the project, Silvio Porretta was the sole artist for the game, creating both concept and texture artwork for the characters, with Porretta stating that he learned texture mapping under a few weeks and quickly adapted to the tools at his disposal. The title song was composed by American musician Joe Vitale.

Fight for Life went through a troubled development cycle until it was released, with both Bertrand and Porretta stating that the reason why development took longer than expected was due to the state of Atari at the time as well as meddling from the company itself. In an April 1998 feature article by Next Generation magazine discussing some of the biggest failures in the gaming industry, it revealed that at least two producers were in charge of the game, with the second of them referring it as a "nightmare" and requesting that his name be removed from the credits, while the manual in the final release lists Bill Rehbock as its executive producer.

All you have heard from there was coming from this mistake. It is very depressing to have your work screwed like this, but I wasn't able to do anything at this time.

— Francois Bertrand when explaining the mistake realized by the marketing department at Atari after sending preview copies to the press.

An anonymous former Atari employee claimed that the original producer constantly led the company's upper management into believing the game would redefine the fighting genre. He also claimed to be present at one meeting in particular where the game was displayed side-by-side with Namco's Tekken and the executives agreed it was a legitimate competitor to both Tekken and Tamsoft's Battle Arena Toshinden. Atari sent preview copies of an early build of the game to video game magazines, however the marketing department made a mistake of sending them with the sentence "for review only" instead of preview, leading to some publications reviewing the game in its early state and as a result of this error, the company told the press that they were going to "reject and revamp" the product, with Bertrand later stating that development was progressing normally.

Fight for Life originally ran at 20 frames per second and the three-dimensional character models consisted of 900 polygons with very minimal texture mapping applied to them and featuring graphical effects such as light sourcing, with plans to increase their number to 1200 polygons, however the final release runs at 25 frames per second with models consisting between 600-800 polygons depending on the character and having minimal textures applied, while the visuals are displayed at a resolution of 320x240 in the 16-bit high color format. Despite the turbulent development and his lack of experience with previous Atari hardware, Bertrand enjoyed working with the Jaguar, regarding it as an interesting system to work on and claimed to be happy with the final product. He also stated that his impression was that most Jaguar owners were thankful for the time and effort he put into making the game. Bertrand stated in 2018 that he would change certain aspects of the game if he had to rework the title.

== Release ==
Fight for Life was first previewed across various video game magazines and the Do The Math promotional recording sent by Atari to video game retail stores in late 1994 under its earliest playable state, featuring several playable characters, five selectable stages and an early version of the replay feature, with gaming magazines immediately comparing the game to Virtua Fighter due to the involvement of Bertrand, and was slated for a December 1994/Q1 1995 release.

The game made its first playable appearance at Atari's booth during the Winter Consumer Electronics Show in 1995, featuring improved visuals compared to the earlier version. It would also make appearance on the showfloor of events such as Spring ECTS '95 and E3 1995 in a nearly complete state, with the latter being its last trade show appearance prior to being launched and where Bertrand showcased the project to attendees of the event, in addition of being slated for a Q2/Q3 1995 release date and remained to be previewed across various magazines. It was also covered by the press who were invited to Atari's UK division.

Despite development of the game being completed in December 1995, Bertrand did not deliver the game until much later to Atari, who began laying off their employees and cancelling upcoming projects for the Jaguar before merging with JT Storage in a reverse takeover on July 30, 1996. Although the game was released in 1996 as the final Atari-published title for the Jaguar, Bertrand has since stated that the game was shipped in an almost finished state due to time and budget constraints, scrapping elements during the process. Despite rumors of a 100% complete build, there is no concrete evidence that this version exists, and Bertrand has said that to the best of his knowledge the scrapped elements were discarded rather than incorporated into a different build. The game was included as part of the Atari 50: The Anniversary Celebration compilation for Nintendo Switch, PlayStation 4, Steam, and Xbox One, marking its first re-release.

=== Fight for Life Beta ===
In 2005, a beta build of Fight for Life was released by the defunct Jaguar Sector II website under the title Fight for Life Beta, featuring several differences between it and the final release. Only a few copies were produced.

== Reception ==
Reception

Review scores
Publication	Score
AllGame	1.5/5
GameFan	30/100, 55/100, 65/100
Next Generation	2/5
ST Format	90%
Atari Gaming Headquarters	7 / 10
The Atari Times	60%
Fun Generation	6 / 10
ST-Computer	82%
ST Magazine	83%
Video Games	32%

As a result of the mislabeling by Atari's marketing department, Next Generation reviewed a preview copy of the game, and said it had "some of the worst execution and gameplay yet." The reviewer particularly mentioned the crude, clunky movements of the characters, which he likened to that of the toy Rock 'Em Sock 'Em Robots. Upon the game's release Next Generation reviewed it again, but was only slightly more positive about the release version. The reviewer judged Fight for Life to be an effectively next generation fighter, saying the texture-mapped polygonal characters are detailed, the animation is smooth, and the true 3D movement and defense system are innovative. However, he concluded that the slow responsiveness of the controls and the extremely slow pace override these assets, since they make the game boring to play. The three reviewers of GameFan panned the game, heavily criticizing its graphics, camera, music, and gameplay. Dave Halverson concluded, "What an appropriate send-off for the Jag. A terrible system's terrible last hurrah".

In a retrospective review, Kyle Knight of Allgame also found Fight for Life's crippling flaw to be its slow controls and pace, speculating that "You could almost read a book while playing, and glance at the screen every so often to keep track of what's going on". However, he also described the graphics as having minimal detail and the animation as awkward. Noting the move-stealing feature to be its one positive quality, he summarized the game as "one of the poorest examples of 3D fighter you'll find anywhere".

== Legacy ==
On April 18, 1996, the game's trademark was abandoned. Electronic Gaming Monthly's Seanbaby put it as number 3 in his "20 worst games of all time" feature. Years after its release, the game's source code would be released by Jaguar Sector II under a CD compilation for PC titled Jaguar Source Code Collection on August 24, 2008.
