= Secret Quest =

1989 video game

- Developer: Axlon
- Publisher: Atari Corporation
- Programmer: Steve DeFrisco
- Platform: Atari 2600
- Release: May 1989
- Genre: Action-adventure
- Mode: Single-player

Secret Quest on the Atari 2600

Secret Quest is a 1989 action-adventure game developed by Axlon and published by Atari Corporation for the Atari 2600. The player controls a humanoid character that fights monsters and gathers items on a series of space stations. It was one of the last cartridges released for the console and has a larger ROM capacity than most 2600 games plus a small amount of RAM. The box credits Nolan Bushnell for the game and includes his photo on both the front and back. According to Secret Quest programmer Steve DeFrisco, "Atari thought that his name would entice people to buy some more 2600 titles".

== Plot ==
The player controls a hero trying to stop several alien space station attacks. He is dressed in a space suit fighting aliens released from the space stations. He is trying to defuse a bomb set by the aliens, and detonate bombs in the space stations using codes.

== Development ==
The game was inspired by Nintendo's The Legend Of Zelda (1986) for the Nintendo Entertainment System, with the final space-themed concept developed and programmed by Steve DeFrisco. Chris DeFrisco was hired to complete the artwork. A save-game mechanic was incorporated due to the design concept of having many locations in an adventure-style format. The development team faced data-size issues when trying to fit the game onto the cartridge ROM.

According to Vintage Games, the game was created as a final attempt to prove the 1977 console could compete with more modern hardware. The cartridge is expanded with 256 bytes of RAM and 16 kilobytes of ROM.

== Reception ==
NexGam believed the graphics were simple yet respectable. The A.V. Club thought the title was surprising and abstract in the wake of the Atari 2600's final days. Classic Home Video Games called the game ambitious, almost to a fault. Classic Videogame Hardware Genius Guide described it as a "final swan-song" and a way of squeezing the last money out of the console.

== Legacy ==
Secret Quest was included in the Atari FlashBack 2 and subsequent consoles in the series with the exception of the FlashBack 4. In 2022, it was included as part of the Atari 50: The Anniversary Celebration compilation for Nintendo Switch, PlayStation 4, Steam, and Xbox One.
