= Baseball steak =

Cut of beef from the top sirloin cap steak

- Center cut top sirloin cap (baseball steak).
- Alternative names: center cut top sirloin cap steak
- Type: Beef steak

Baseball steak is a center cut of beef taken from the top sirloin cap steak. Baseball steaks differ from sirloin steaks in that the bone and the tenderloin and bottom round muscles have been removed; and the cut is taken from gluteus medius: baseball steak is essentially a center cut top sirloin steak. This cut is very lean, and is considered very flavorful.

The IMPS/NAMP codes for this subprimal cut are 181A and 184: 181A is obtained from 181 after removing the bottom sirloin and the butt tender (the part of the tenderloin which is in the sirloin); 184 is obtained from 182 after removing the bottom sirloin. The foodservice cuts from 184 are 184A through 184F, its portion cut is 1184 and, the "subportion" cuts from 1184 are 1184A through 1184F. 181A is not further divided into foodservice cuts. Baseball steaks are made primarily from cut 184F. In Australia, this cut is called D-rump in the Handbook of Australian Meat and assigned code 2100.

== Etymology ==
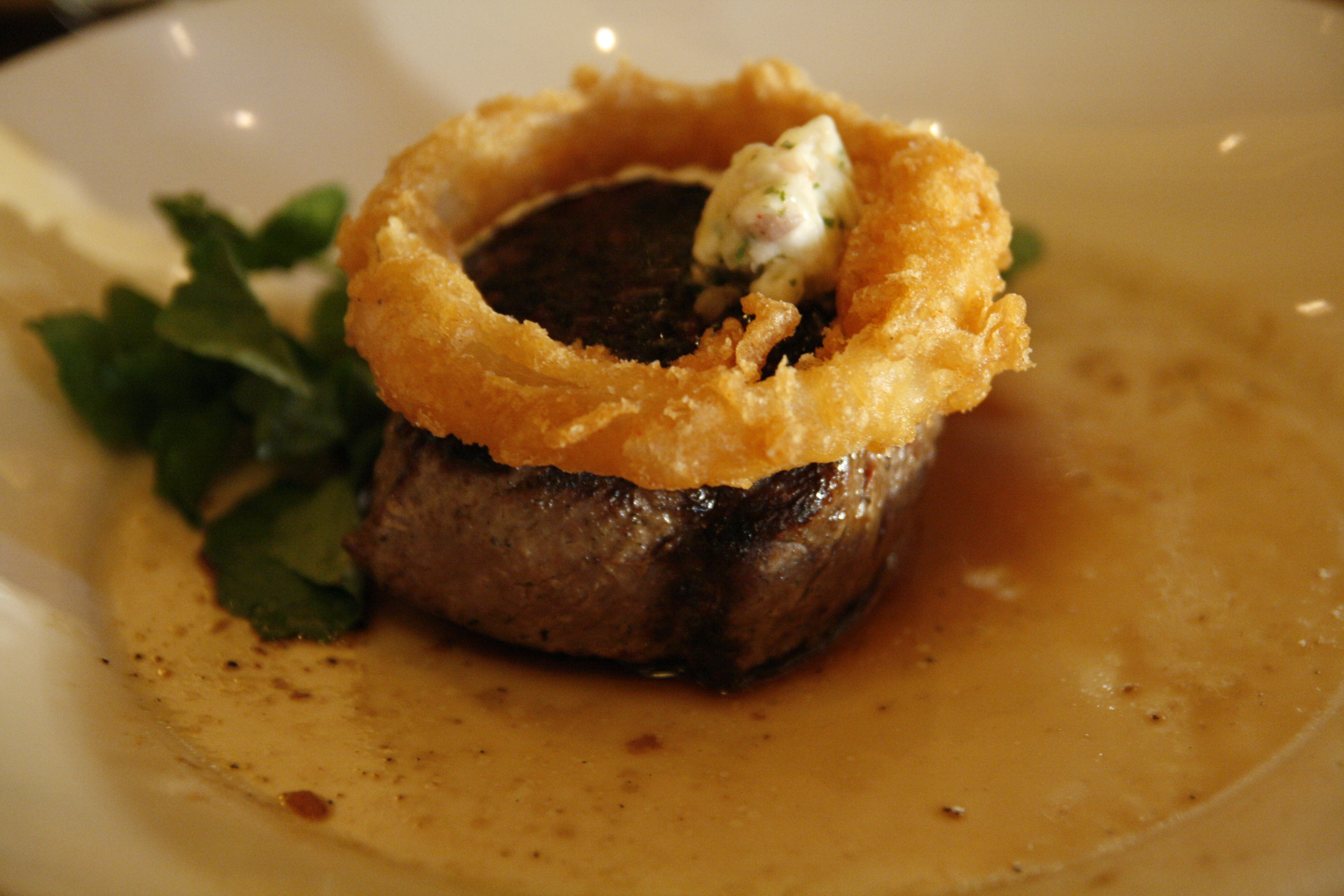
Baseball steak (center cut top sirloin steak), topped with an onion ring.

The name "baseball steak" comes from the shape of the cooked steak: the center domes and swells and forms a rounded shape similar to a baseball.

== Cooking styles ==
Baseball steak is usually served grilled, broiled, sautéed, or pan fried.

== Nutrition ==
A baseball steak per ounce contains 57 calories, 3 grams of fat, and 6 grams of protein. Like other red meats it also contains iron, creatine, minerals such as zinc and phosphorus, and B-vitamins: (niacin, vitamin B_{12}, thiamin, riboflavin), and lipoic acid.

== See also ==
- List of steak dishes
- Top sirloin
