= Baseball (card game) =

Baseball (or in some early editions, "Batter-Up Baseball") is a card game simulating the sport of baseball, played with special cards and a diagram of a baseball diamond. The game was created by Ed-u-Cards Manufacturing Corporation, New York.

== The deck ==
The deck consists of 36 cards representing a variety of base hits, (mostly singles, but only one home run), balks, stolen bases, a hit-by-pitcher, balls, strikes, and a variety of outs.

Two outs, a full count, one RBI, and the bases are loaded: a standard deck (circa 1957) with the original diamond diagram.

A typical deck from the late 1950s or early 1960s consists of:

- 10 balls
- 10 strikes
- 2 foul balls
- 2 fly outs
- 1 foul out
- 2 singles
- 2 doubles
- 1 triple
- 1 home run
- 1 balk
- 1 stolen base
- 1 hit-by-pitcher

Early "Batter-Up Baseball" deck, c. 1949, with instruction sheet/diamond diagram

Earlier decks omitted the balk, stolen base, and hit-by-pitcher, in favor of an additional ball, an additional double play, and an additional single.

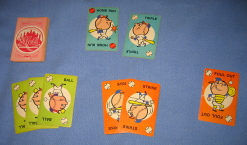
"Mets" Special Edition deck from the early 1960s

In some editions from the 1960s, strikes and outs are color-coded orange, balls green, and all cards that advance a runner, blue, while in late-1950s editions, strikes and outs are green, balls blue, and cards advancing a runner, red. The cards are illustrated with line drawings of the action represented by the card; in the 1960s, a New York Mets edition included Mr. Met as the principal figure in the illustrations, and a Mets logo as the back design.

== The play ==
The game is playable by any arbitrary number of players (the box stating that it "can be played by 1 to 9 players"). The cards are not dealt; instead, whichever player is "at bat" turns over cards from a freshly shuffled deck until put out three times, following the actions named on the cards:

- Strikes are collected, with three strikes becoming an out (and clearing any collected balls).
- Balls are collected, with four balls becoming a walk (and clearing any collected strikes).
- Outs are collected (with each out clearing strikes and balls) until the third out ends the player's turn. If the out is marked "double play at first," and a double play at first is possible, then it counts as a double play.
- Base hits, walks, and hit-by-pitcher are placed on the diamond diagram, with any cards already on the diagram advancing appropriately. A base hit clears the balls and strikes.
- Balks and stolen bases advance runners according to the instructions on the card, and actual baseball rules.

An inning consists of each player getting a turn "at bat" for three outs; a game consists of nine innings. Scoring is as in an actual baseball game.

== Availability ==
This game had a limited print run, but decks of varying vintage can be found online. Or one could improvise a deck from the same "VisEd" cards traditionally used in the game of 1000 Blank White Cards.
