= Steeplechase (video game) =

1975 video game

- North American arcade flyer
- Developer: Kee Games
- Publishers: Arcade: NA/EU: Atari, Inc.; JP: Nakamura Seisakusho; 2600; Sears
- Designer: Lyle Rains
- Programmers: 2600; Jim Huether
- Platforms: Arcade, Atari 2600
- Release: Arcade: NA: October 1975; EU: 1975; JP: January 1976; 2600: March 1981
- Genre: Sports
- Modes: Single-player, multiplayer

Steeplechase is a 1975 sports video game developed by Kee Games and published by Atari, Inc. for arcades. It simulates a steeplechase-style horse race. It was distributed in Japan by Nakamura Seisakusho (Namco) in 1976.

== Gameplay ==
Steeplechase on Atari 2600

Up to six players can play against each other, each choosing a horse while the computer controls the seventh horse on the bottom. Each player's horse begins galloping, and the players must jump over obstacles in their lanes by pressing their colored buttons. The horse that successfully jumps all obstacles smoothly becomes the fastest horse and wins.

== Development ==
The game was originally called AstroTurf, and all printed circuit boards still have the name on the board. The game is housed in a custom extra wide cabinet that six individually colored and lit buttons used to make a player's horse jump. The monitor is a 23" black and white CRT monitor with 6 color overlays to make each of the 6 horizontally stacked lanes match their colored button counterparts. Sounds include a bugle, galloping hoof beats, and crowd cheers.

== Ports ==
A conversion for the Atari Video Computer System programmed by Jim Huether was released under the same name in March 1981. It was developed at Atari and distributed under Sears' Tele-Games label. It is one of three games from Atari exclusively for the Tele-Games line.

== Legacy ==
A European version was released by Löwen-Automaten. A Soviet clone of this machine with exact gameplay and graphics, but different cabinet was called Skachki, which can be literally translated as "horse race".
