= Stellar Track =

1981 video game

- Developer: Atari, Inc.
- Publisher: Sears
- Programmer: Rob Zdybel
- Platform: Atari 2600
- Release: March 1981
- Genre: Turn-based strategy
- Mode: Single-player

Stellar Track is a 1981 turn-based strategy video game developed by Atari, Inc. and published by Sears under its Tele-Games label for the Atari 2600 (originally known as the Atari VCS). The game, which was programmed by Rob Zdybel, was one of three games for the console that were released exclusively through Sears. Stellar Track is a text-based game based on the 1971 mainframe computer game Star Trek.

== Gameplay ==
Stellar Track on Atari 2600

Stellar Track is a game in which the player is a commander of a warship and must destroy enough aliens before running out of stardates.

== Reception ==
Richard A. Edwards reviewed Stellar Track for The Space Gamer in August 1982, stating that "Unless you're willing to pay a high price for a remake of an old standard, pass this one up." A January 1983 review in Joystik magazine gave the game three out of five stars, saying that "It's a good game for non-violent strategists, but most others will probably prefer a game with a bit more action, like Star Raiders."
