= Baseball (Intellivision video game) =

1980 video game

- Intellivision box art by Jerrol Richardson
- Developer: Mattel Electronics
- Publisher: Mattel Electronics
- Designer: David Rolfe
- Programmer: David Rolfe
- Platforms: Intellivision, Atari 2600
- Release: Intellivision: September 4, 1980; 2600: June 1982
- Genre: Sports (baseball)
- Mode: Multiplayer

Baseball (originally released as Major League Baseball) is a baseball video game produced by Mattel and released for its Intellivision console in 1980. As the best-selling game in the console's history, with more than a million copies sold, Baseball put players in control of a nine-man baseball team competing in a standard nine-inning game. When first released, Mattel obtained a license from Major League Baseball, though the only trademarked item used is the MLB logo on the box art. No official team names or player names are in the game. It was later released by the INTV Corporation as Big League Baseball.

== Gameplay ==
Super Challenge Baseball for Atari 2600

The game consists of nine innings on a simplified baseball diamond. The team that scores the most runs wins.

Player 1 is always the visiting team and bats at the top of the innings, with Player 2 as the home team and batting at the bottom of the innings. The pitching player selects a pitch by pushing the controller in one of eight cardinal directions, each representing a different speed and direction. The batting player then attempts to hit the ball into play and reach the base, so that subsequent batters can move to home plate and thus score a run. If the ball is hit into play, the pitching player uses the keypad to select a fielder who attempts to catch the ball, then chooses who will receive the throw, to put the runner "out".

The batting player is able to advance the base-runners off base in an attempt to steal a base, but the pitching player can counter that with a pickoff before the pitch is thrown.

If the score is tied at the end of the 9th inning, extra innings are played until a winner is determined.

=== Variations from standard baseball ===
Even though the two teams represented in Baseball are basically the same, the level of simulation is remarkable for its time. A wide array of baseball strategy includes Double plays, triple plays, rundowns, and intentional walks. Changes include all hits being automatically grounders, with no provisions for flyballs. Home runs depend on how and where the ball is hit.

Another major change allows the batting player to score a run on a third out, if the base-runner reaches home plate before the third out takes place. For example, if the bases are loaded with two outs and the batter manages to hit the ball into play, the runner on third base could score if a throw to third base forces out the runner from second base (thus, the third out). This happens if the runner on third base crosses home plate before the runner from second base reaches third base.

== Ports ==
An updated version titled World Championship Baseball was released in 1983. Sears sold it without the MLB license for its private-label Super Video Arcade console, and Mattel's M Network produced an Atari 2600 conversion called Super Challenge Baseball. After Mattel Electronics ceased production of the Intellivision system and its assets were sold to INTV Corporation, Major League Baseball was re-released with the new name Big League Baseball. It is in the Intellivision Lives! compilation and in Microsoft's Game Room service as Baseball.

== Reception ==
Baseball was reviewed by Video magazine in its "Arcade Alley" column where it was praised for its inclusion of moveable fielders and "flashy" baserunning techniques like the suicide squeeze. Criticism was given to the somewhat simplistic pitching controls, and the fact that "all batted balls are grounders", but overall the game was described as "blow[ing] away" all other contemporary baseball video games. The game is covered in Video magazine's 1982 Guide to Electronic Games where reviewers noted that the game had "lost none of its luster" since its release. In 1995, Flux magazine ranked the game 37th on its Top 100 Video Games. It praised the realistic graphics and the ability to control each player individually. The game was also reviewed in Games magazine.
