= Atari 2600 =

Home video game console

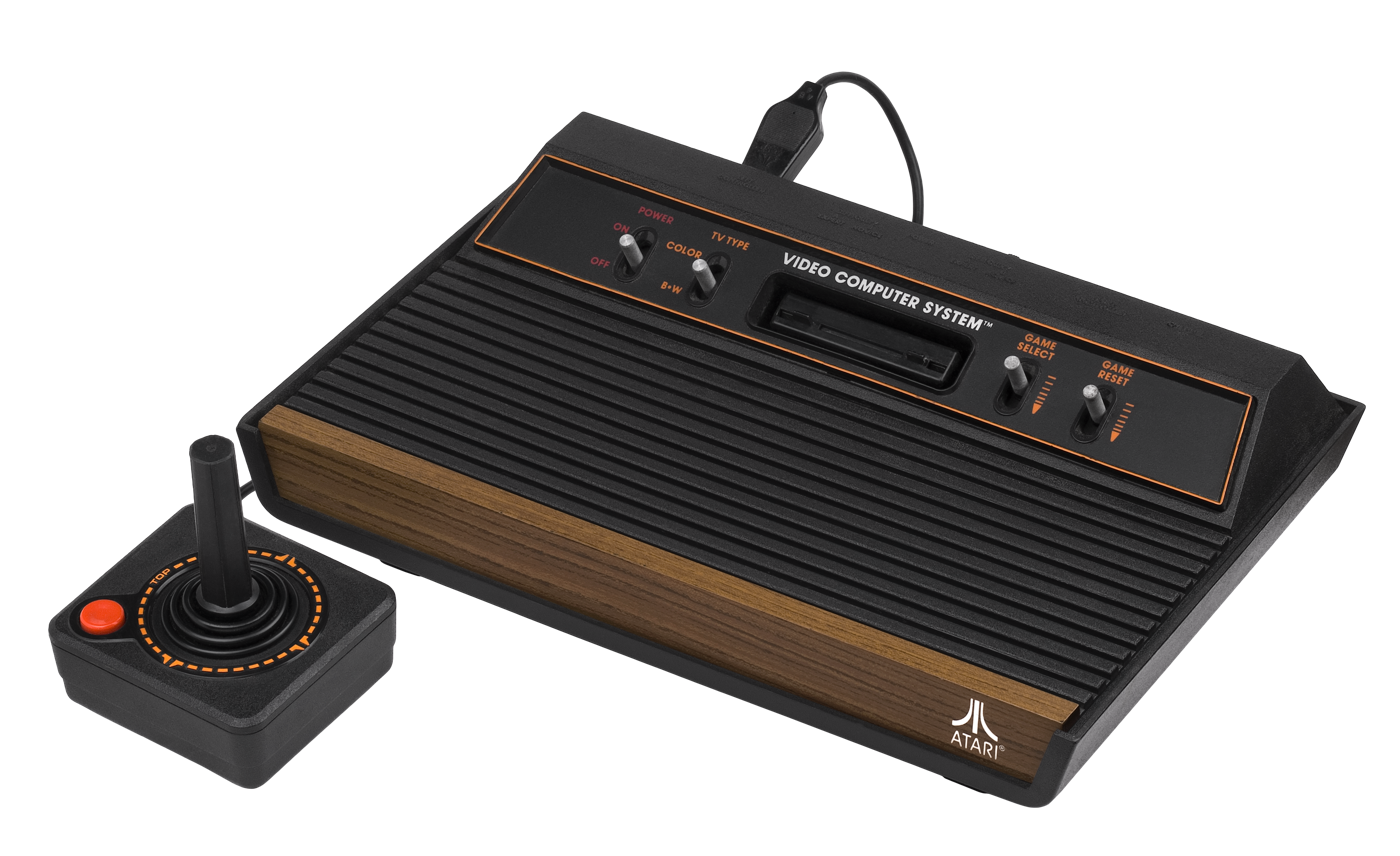
- Four-switch VCS model (1980–1982)
- Also known as: Atari Video Computer System (1977–1982)
- Manufacturer: Atari, Inc.
- Type: Home video game console
- Generation: Second
- Released: NA: c. September 1977 (Note: The exact date that the console hit store shelves is unknown and may have been as early as August 1977 or as late as October 1977.); EU: 1978; FRA: 1982; BR: September 1983; JP: October 1983 (Atari 2800)
- Introductory price: US$189.95 (equivalent to $1,010 in 2025)
- Discontinued: 1992
- Units sold: 30 million
- Media: ROM cartridge
- CPU: MOS Technology 6507 @ 1.19 MHz
- Memory: 128 bytes RAM
- Graphics: Television Interface Adaptor
- Controller input: Joystick; paddles; driving; keypad; Trak-Ball
- Best-selling game: Pac-Man, 8 million (Note: 7,271,844 in 1982. 684,569 in 1983. 37,063 in 1986. 61,685 in 1987. 3,885 in 1988. 34,374 in 1989. 2,166 in 1990.) (list)
- Predecessor: Atari Home Pong; Atari Video Pinball
- Successor: Atari 5200

The Atari 2600 is a home video game console developed and produced by Atari, Inc. Released c. September 1977 as the Atari Video Computer System (Atari VCS), it popularized microprocessor-based hardware and games stored on swappable ROM cartridges, a format first used with the Fairchild Channel F in 1976. The VCS was bundled with two joystick controllers, a conjoined pair of paddle controllers, and a game cartridge—initially Combat and later Pac-Man. Sears sold the system as the Tele-Games Video Arcade. Atari rebranded the VCS as the Atari 2600 in November 1982, alongside the release of the Atari 5200.

During the mid-1970s, Atari had been successful at creating arcade video games, but their development cost and limited lifespan drove CEO Nolan Bushnell to seek a programmable home system. The first inexpensive microprocessors from MOS Technology in late 1975 made this feasible. The console was prototyped under the codename Stella by Atari subsidiary Cyan Engineering. Lacking funding to complete the project, Bushnell sold Atari to Warner Communications in 1976.

The Atari VCS was launched in 1977 with nine games on 2 KB cartridges. Atari ported many of their arcade games to the system, and the VCS versions of Breakout and Night Driver are in color while the arcade originals have monochrome graphics. The system's first killer application was the home conversion of Taito's Space Invaders in 1980. Adventure, also released in 1980, was one of the first action-adventure video games and contains the first widely recognized Easter egg. The popularity of the VCS led to the founding of Activision and other third-party game developers, as well as competition from the Intellivision and, years later, ColecoVision consoles. Beginning with the VCS version of Asteroids in 1980, many games used bank switching to allow 8 KB or larger cartridges. By the time of the system's peak in 1982–83, games were released with significantly more advanced visuals and gameplay than the system was designed for, such as Pitfall!.

By 1982, the 2600 was the dominant game system in North America, and "Atari" had entered the vernacular as a synonym for the console and video games in general. However, poor decisions by Atari management damaged both the system's and the company's reputation, most notably the release of two highly anticipated games for the 2600: a port of the arcade game Pac-Man and E.T. the Extra-Terrestrial. Pac-Man became the 2600's best-selling game, but was panned for not resembling the original. E.T. was rushed to market for the holiday shopping season and was similarly disparaged. Both games, coupled with a glut of third-party shovelware, were factors in ending Atari's dominance of the console market, contributing to the North American video game crash of 1983.

Warner sold the assets of Atari's consumer electronics division to former Commodore CEO Jack Tramiel in 1984. In 1986, the new Atari Corporation under Tramiel released a revised, low-cost 2600 model, and the backward-compatible Atari 7800, but it was Nintendo that led the recovery of the industry with the 1985 North American launch of the Nintendo Entertainment System. Production of the Atari 2600 ended in 1992, with an estimated 30 million units sold across its lifetime.

== History ==
Atari VCS/2600 timeline
1972	Formation of Atari, Inc.
1973
1974	Acquisition of Cyan Engineering
1975	Debut of the MOS Technology 6502
1976	Sale of Atari to Warner Communications
1977	Launch of Atari VCS
1978
1979	Formation of Activision
1980	Release of Space Invaders and Adventure
1981	First bank-switched game: Asteroids
1982	Rebranding to Atari 2600 (November)
1982	Release of Pac-Man and E.T.
1983	Video game crash of 1983
1984	Sale of Atari to Jack Tramiel
1985
1986	Release of US$50 model
1987
1988
1989
1990	Final Atari 2600 game: Klax
1991
1992	Discontinuation

Atari, Inc. was founded by Nolan Bushnell and Ted Dabney in 1972. Its first major product was Pong, released in 1972, the first successful coin-operated video game. While Atari continued to develop new arcade games in following years, Pong gave rise to a number of competitors to the growing arcade game market. The competition along with other missteps by Atari led to financial problems in 1974 before the company recovered by the end of the year. By 1975, Atari had released a Pong home console that competed against Magnavox, the only other major producer of home consoles at the time. However, Atari engineers recognized the limitation of custom logic integrated onto the circuit board, permanently confining the whole console to only one game. The increasing competition increased the risk, as Atari had found with past arcade games and again with dedicated home consoles. Both platforms are built from integrating discrete electro-mechanical components into circuits instead of being programmed as on a mainframe computer. Thus, development of a console had cost at least $100,000 (equivalent to about $598,000 in 2025) plus time to complete, but the final product only had about a three-month shelf life before becoming outdated by competition.

By 1974, Atari had acquired Cyan Engineering, a Grass Valley electronics company founded by Steve Mayer and Larry Emmons, both former colleagues of Bushnell and Dabney from Ampex, who helped to develop new ideas for Atari's arcade games. Even before the release of the home version of Pong, Cyan's engineers, led by Mayer and Ron Milner, had envisioned a home console powered by new programmable microprocessors capable of playing Atari's arcade offerings of the time. The programmable microprocessors would make a console's design significantly simpler and more powerful than any dedicated single-game unit. However, the cost $100–300 of such chips was far outside the range that their market would tolerate. Atari had opened negotiations to use Motorola's new 6800 in future systems.

=== MOS Technology 6502/6507 ===
In September 1975, MOS Technology debuted the 6502 microprocessor for $25 at the Wescon trade show in San Francisco. Mayer and Milner attended, and met with Chuck Peddle, the leader of the team that created the chip. They proposed using the 6502 in a game console, and offered to discuss it further at Cyan's facilities after the show.

Over two days, MOS and Cyan engineers sketched out a 6502-based console design by Meyer and Milner's specifications. Financial models showed that even at $25, the 6502 would be too expensive, and Peddle offered them a planned 6507 microprocessor, a cost-reduced version of the 6502, and MOS's RIOT chip for input/output. Cyan and MOS negotiated the 6507 and RIOT chips at $12 a pair. MOS also introduced Cyan to Microcomputer Associates, who had separately developed debugging software and hardware for MOS, and had developed the JOLT Computer for testing the 6502, which Peddle suggested would be useful for Atari and Cyan to use while developing their system. Milner was able to demonstrate a proof-of-concept for a programmable console by implementing Tank, an arcade game by Atari subsidiary Kee Games, on the JOLT.

As part of the deal, Atari wanted a second source of the chipset. Peddle and Paivinen suggested Synertek, whose co-founder, Bob Schreiner, was a friend of Peddle. In October 1975, Atari informed the market that it was moving forward with MOS. The Motorola sales team had already told its management that the Atari deal was finalized, and Motorola management was livid. They announced a lawsuit against MOS the next week.

=== Building the system ===
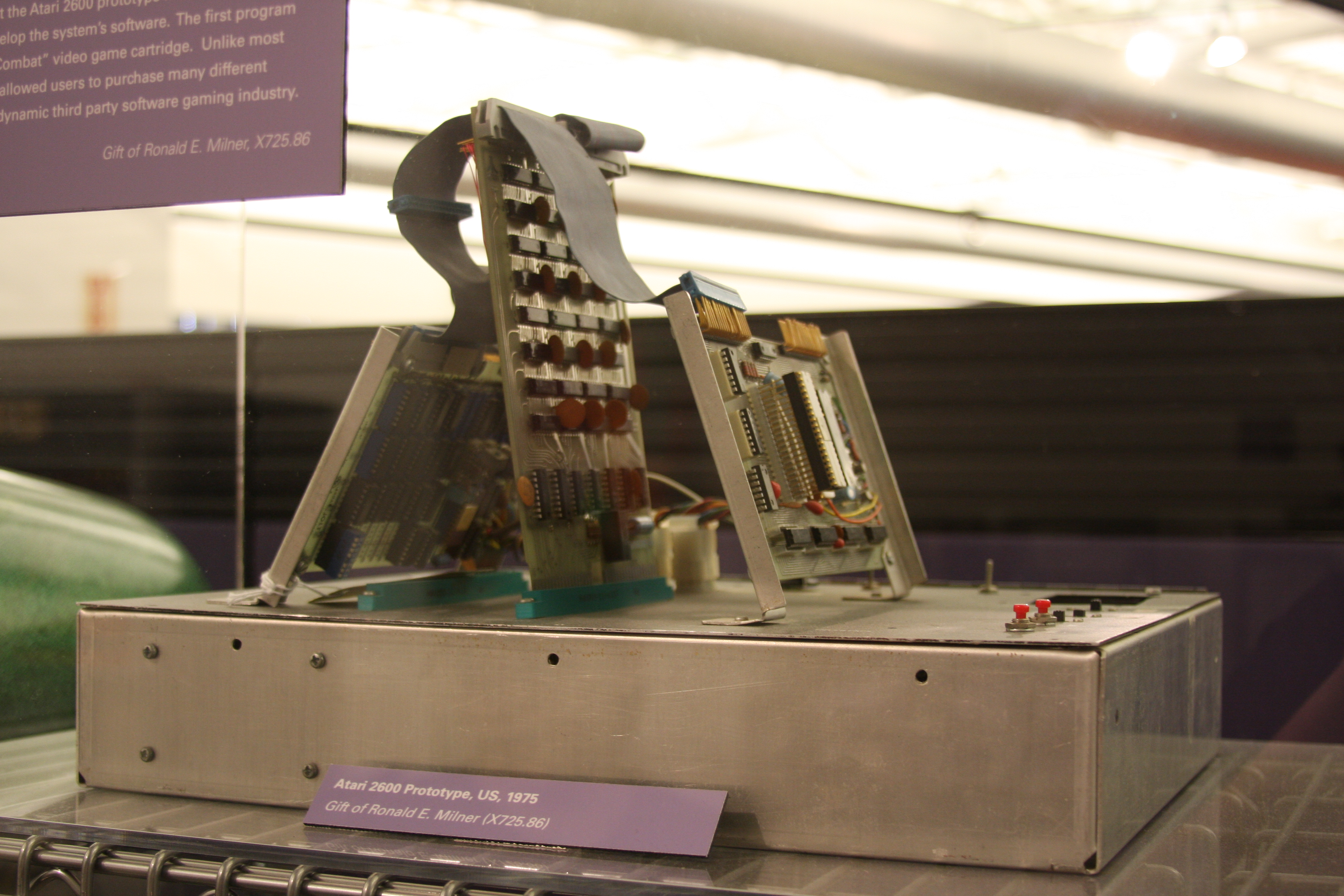
The first Stella prototype on display at the Computer History Museum

By December 1975, Atari hired Joe Decuir, a recent graduate from University of California, Berkeley who had been doing his own testing on the 6502. Decuir began debugging the first prototype designed by Mayer and Milner, which gained the codename "Stella" after the brand of Decuir's bicycle. This prototype included a breadboard-level design of the graphics interface to build upon. A second prototype was completed by March 1976 with the help of Jay Miner, who created a chip called the Television Interface Adaptor (TIA) to send graphics and audio to a television. The second prototype included a TIA, a 6507, and a ROM cartridge slot and adapter. Believing that the console would only sell for two to three years against competition, the team designed the product as quickly as possible, emphasizing low cost.

As the TIA's design was refined, Al Alcorn brought in Atari's game developers to provide input on features. There were significant limitations in the 6507, the TIA, and other components, so the programmers creatively optimized their games to maximize the console. The console lacks a framebuffer and requires games to instruct the system to generate graphics in synchronization with the electron gun in the cathode ray tube (CRT) as it scans across rows on the screen. The programmers found ways to "race the beam" to perform other functions while the electron gun scans outside of the visible screen.

Alongside the electronics development, Bushnell brought in Gene Landrum, a consultant who had already consulted for Fairchild Camera and Instrument for its upcoming Channel F, to determine the consumer requirements for the console. In his final report, Landrum suggested a living room aesthetic, with a wood grain finish, and for the cartridges to be "idiot proof, child proof and effective in resisting potential static [electricity] problems in a living room environment". Landrum recommended it include four to five dedicated games in addition to the cartridges, but this was dropped in the final designs. The cartridge design was done by James Asher and Douglas Hardy. Hardy had been an engineer for Fairchild and helped in the initial design of the Channel F cartridges, but he quit to join Atari in 1976. The interior of the cartridge that Asher and Hardy designed was sufficiently different to avoid patent conflicts, but the exterior components were directly influenced by the Channel F to help work around the static electricity concerns. Atari expected to sell three to four cartridges per console.

Atari was still recovering from its 1974 financial woes, and needed additional capital to fully enter the home console market; however, Bushnell was wary of being beholden to outside financial sources. Atari obtained smaller investments through 1975, but not at the scale it needed, and began considering a sale to a larger firm by early 1976. Atari was introduced to Warner Communications, which saw the potential for the growing video game industry to help offset declining profits from its film and music divisions. Negotiations took place during 1976, during which Atari cleared itself of liabilities, including settling a patent infringement lawsuit with Magnavox over Ralph H. Baer's patents that were the basis for the Magnavox Odyssey. In mid-1976, Fairchild announced the Channel F, planned for release later that year, beating Atari to the market.

By October 1976, Warner and Atari agreed to the purchase of Atari for $28 million. Warner provided an estimated $120 million, which was enough to fast-track Stella. By 1977, development had advanced enough to brand it the Atari Video Computer System (VCS) and start developing games.

=== Launch and success ===
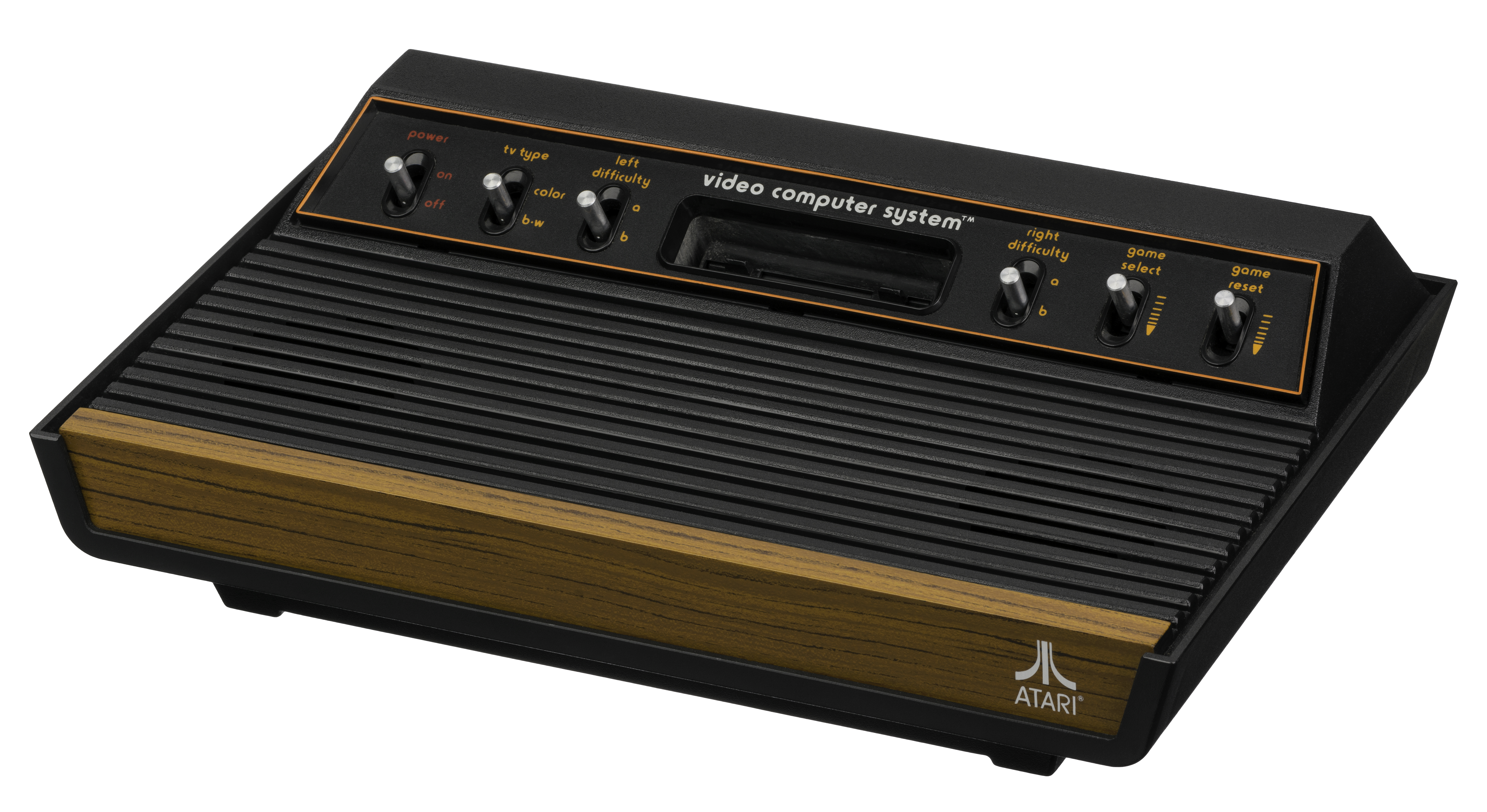
The second VCS model has lighter plastic molding and shielding, and a more angular shape, than the 1977 launch model.

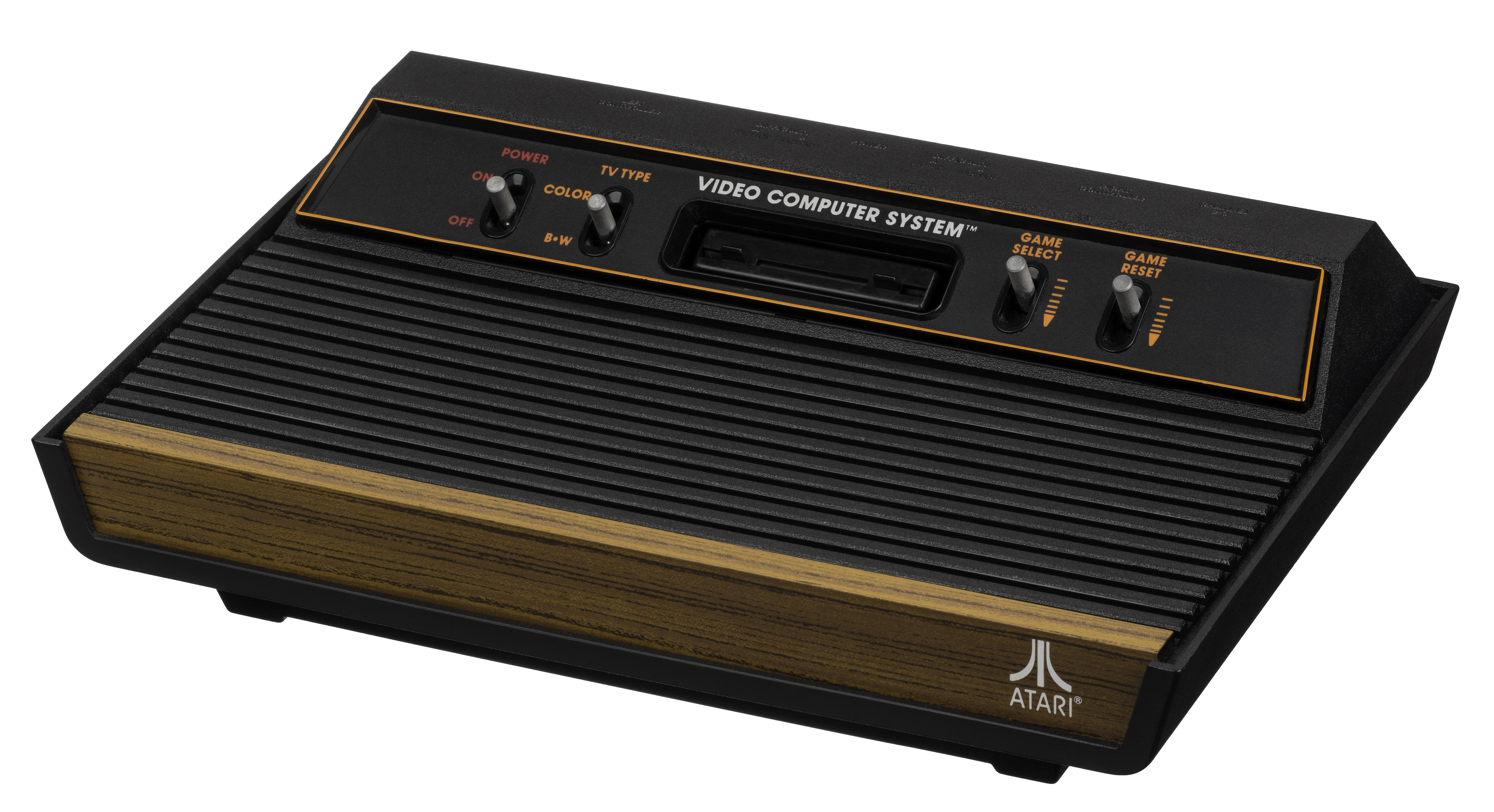
Starting in 1980, the VCS has only four front switches and a capital-letters logotype.

The unit was showcased on June 4, 1977, at the Summer Consumer Electronics Show, with plans for retail release in October. The announcement was purportedly delayed to wait out the terms of the Magnavox patent lawsuit settlement, which would have given Magnavox all technical information on any of Atari's products announced between June 1, 1976, and June 1, 1977. However, Atari encountered production problems during its first batch, and its testing was complicated by the use of cartridges.

Combat, the pack-in game at launch

Newspaper advertisements for the Atari VCS began appearing in August 1977, with the console arriving on store shelves within the following months. The console launched at $199 (equivalent to about $1,060 in 2025), with two joysticks and a Combat cartridge; eight additional games were sold separately. Most of the launch games were based on arcade games developed by Atari or its subsidiary Kee Games: for example, Combat was based on Kee's Tank (1974) and Atari's Jet Fighter (1975). Atari sold between 350,000 and 400,000 Atari VCS units during 1977, which was attributed to the delay in shipping the units and consumers' unfamiliarity with a swappable-cartridge console not dedicated to only one game.

In 1978, Atari sold only 550,000 of the 800,000 systems that had been manufactured, requiring further financial support from Warner to cover losses. Bushnell pushed the Warner Board of Directors to start working on "Stella 2", as he grew concerned that rising competition and aging tech specs of the VCS would render the console obsolete. However, the board stayed committed to the VCS and ignored Bushnell's advice, leading to his departure from Atari in 1979. Atari sold about 600,000 VCS systems in 1979, bringing the installed base to a little over 1.3 million.

Atari obtained a license from Taito to develop a VCS conversion of its 1978 arcade hit Space Invaders, which made it the first officially licensed arcade conversion for a home console. Atari sold 1.25 million Space Invaders cartridges and more than a million VCS systems in 1980, nearly doubling the install base to over 2 million, and then an estimated 3.1 million VCS systems in 1981. By 1982, 10 million consoles had been sold in the United States, while its best-selling game was Pac-Man, of which over 8 million copies had been sold by 1990. Pac-Man propelled worldwide Atari VCS sales to 12 million units during 1982, according to a November 1983 article in InfoWorld magazine. A subsequent InfoWorld article from August 1984 stated that more than 15 million Atari 2600 machines had been sold by 1982. A March 1983 article in IEEE Spectrum magazine estimated about 3 million VCS sales in 1981, about 5.5 million in 1982, as well as a total of over 12 million VCS systems and an estimated 120 million cartridges sold.

In Europe, the Atari VCS sold 125,000 units in the United Kingdom during 1980, and 450,000 in West Germany by 1984. In France, where the VCS released in 1982, the system sold 600,000 units by 1989. The console was distributed by Epoch Co. in Japan in 1979 under the name "Cassette TV Game", but did not sell as well as Epoch's own Cassette Vision system in 1981. In English-speaking countries, the console was distributed in the United Kingdom (first from 1979 by Ingersoll Electronics Ltd., later by Railway Terrace), Australia (by Futuretronics), Canada (first from 1977 by Paragon Entertainment and from 1980 by Irwin Toys), Ireland (from 1979 by Quintin Flynn and from 1982 by Omnitek), New Zealand (by Monaco), Singapore (by Hin Seng Ltd), South Africa (by Frank & Hirsch), Hong Kong (by Wong's Kong King Ltd) and Malaysia (by Perangsang International Sdn Bhd).

In 1982, Atari launched its second programmable console, the Atari 5200. To standardize naming, the VCS was renamed the Atari 2600 Video Computer System, or Atari 2600, with the number derived from the manufacture part number CX2600. By 1982, the 2600 cost Atari about $40 to manufacture, and was sold for an average of $125 (equivalent to $420 in 2025). The company spent $4.50 to $6 to manufacture each cartridge, plus $1 to $2 for advertising, wholesaling for $18.95 (equivalent to $60 in 2025).

=== Third-party development ===
At first, all 2600 software came from Atari. Activision, formed by Crane, Whitehead, and Miller in 1979, started developing third-party VCS games using their knowledge of VCS design and programming tricks, and began releasing games in 1980. Kaboom! (1981) and Pitfall! (1982) are among the most successful, with at least one and four million copies sold, respectively. In 1980, Atari attempted to block the sale of the Activision cartridges, accusing the four of intellectual property infringement. The two companies settled out of court, with Activision agreeing to pay Atari a licensing fee for their games. This made Activision the first third-party video game developer, and established the licensing model that continues to be used by console manufacturers for game development.

By 1982, 16 companies were producing or had announced plans to produce 2600 software, including U.S. Games, Telesys, Games by Apollo, Data Age, Zimag, Mystique, and CommaVid. The founding of Imagic included ex-Atari programmers. Mattel and Coleco, each already producing its own more advanced console, created simplified versions of their existing games for the 2600. Mattel used the M Network brand name for its cartridges. Third-party games accounted for half of VCS game sales by 1982.

=== Decline and redesign ===
In addition to third-party game development, Atari also received the first major threat to its hardware dominance from the ColecoVision. Coleco had a license from Nintendo to develop a home version of Nintendo's 1981 arcade hit Donkey Kong, which was bundled with every ColecoVision console. Coleco gained about 17% of the hardware market in 1982 compared to Atari's 58%. With third parties competing for market share, Atari worked to maintain dominance in the market by acquiring licenses for popular arcade games and other properties to make games from. The 2600 conversion of Pac-Man had numerous technical and aesthetic flaws, but still sold upwards of 7 million copies. Heading into the 1982 holiday shopping season, Atari had placed high sales expectations on E.T. the Extra-Terrestrial, a game based on the film of the same name that was programmed in about six weeks. Atari produced an estimated four million cartridges of E.T., but the game was poorly reviewed, and only about 1.5 million copies were sold.

In December 1982, Warner Communications issued revised earnings guidance to its shareholders, having expected a 50% year-to-year growth but now only expecting 10–15% due to declining sales at Atari. Coupled with the oversaturated home game market, Atari's weakened position led investors to start pulling funds out of video games, beginning a cascade of disastrous effects that would come to be known as the video game crash of 1983. Many third-party developers formed prior to 1983 were closed, and Mattel and Coleco both left the video game market by 1985.

In September 1983, Atari sent 14 truckloads of unsold Atari 2600 cartridges and other equipment to a landfill in the New Mexico desert. The event was long considered an urban legend that claimed the burial contained millions of unsold cartridges. However, when the site was excavated in 2014, only 700,000 cartridges were revealed to have been buried, confirming reports from former Atari executives. Atari reported a $536 million loss for 1983 as a whole, and continued to lose money into 1984, with a $425 million loss reported in the second quarter. By mid-1984, software development for the 2600 had essentially stopped, except for that of Atari and Activision.

Warner, wary of supporting its failing Atari division, started looking for buyers. In July 1984, it sold most of the assets of Atari's consumer electronics and home computer divisions to Jack Tramiel, the founder of Commodore International, in a deal valued at $240 million; Warner would retain Atari's arcade business, which would be rechristened as Atari Games. Tramiel, a proponent of personal computers, halted all game development for the 2600 soon after the sale.

The North American video game market did not recover until about 1986, after Nintendo's 1985 launch of the Nintendo Entertainment System in North America. In 1986, Atari Corporation released a redesigned version of the 2600, supported by an ad campaign touting a price of "under 50 bucks". With a large library of cartridges and a low price point, the 2600 continued to sell into the late 1980s. Atari released the last batch of games in 1989–90, including Secret Quest and Fatal Run. By 1986, over 20 million Atari VCS units had been sold worldwide. The final Atari-licensed release was the PAL-only version of the arcade game Klax in 1990.

After more than 14 years on the market, production on the 2600, along with the Atari 7800 and Atari 8-bit computers, ended in 1992. Despite this, sales of the 2600 continued in Europe for years to come. It cost less than £39.99 and was mainly distributed through mail order chains. In 1991, 200,000 units were sold on the continent, and it was a bestseller at Littlewoods stores in the UK. After the fall of communism, Atari attempted to legally introduce the Atari 2600 and 7800 to former Eastern Bloc countries, with the small price being main advantage of the system. However, Atari was defeated by even cheaper and easily available clones called "Rambo TV Game 2600" (advertised with the 1982 movie character Rambo), which contained up to several hundred built-in games. In Western Europe, the last stocks of the 2600 and 7800 were sold until the summer/fall of 1995.

== Hardware ==
The Atari 2600's CPU is the MOS Technology 6507, a version of the 6502, running at 1.19 MHz in the 2600. Though their internal silicon was identical, the 6507 was cheaper than the 6502 because its package included fewer memory-address pins—13 instead of 16. The designers of the Atari 2600 selected an inexpensive cartridge interface that has one fewer address pins than the 13 allowed by the 6507, further reducing the already limited addressable memory from 8 KB (2^{13} = 8,192) to 4 KB (2^{12} = 4,096). This was believed to be sufficient as Combat was only 2 KB. Later games circumvented this limitation with bank switching.

The console has 128 bytes of RAM for scratch space, the call stack, and the state of the game environment.

The top bezel of the console originally had six switches: power, TV type selection (color or black-and-white), game selection, left and right player difficulty, and game reset. The difficulty switches were moved to the back of the bezel in later versions of the console. The back bezel also included the controller ports.

=== Graphics ===
Pitfall! (1982) has more advanced graphics than the games the VCS launched with. The black bar on the left provides extra time for the program to prepare graphics between each scanline.

The Atari 2600 was designed to be compatible with the CRT television sets produced in the late 1970s and early 1980s, which commonly lack auxiliary video inputs to receive audio and video from another device. Therefore, to connect to a TV, the console generates a radio frequency signal compatible with the regional television standards (NTSC, PAL, or SECAM), using a special switch box to act as the television's antenna.

Atari developed the Television Interface Adaptor (TIA) chip in the VCS to handle the graphics and conversion to a television signal. It provides a single-color, 20-bit background register that covers the left half of the screen (each bit represents 4 adjacent pixels) and is either repeated or reflected on the right side. There are 5 single-color sprites: two 8-pixel wide players; two 1 bit missiles, which share the same colors as the players; and a 1-pixel ball, which shares the background color. The 1-bit sprites all can be controlled to stretch to 1, 2, 4, or 8 pixels.

The system was designed without a frame buffer to avoid the cost of the associated RAM. The background and sprites apply to a single scan line, and as the display is output to the television, the program can change colors, sprite positions, and background settings. The careful timing required to sync the code to the screen on the part of the programmer was labeled "racing the beam"; the actual game logic runs when the television beam is outside of the visible area of the screen. Early games for the system use the same visuals for pairs of scan lines, giving a lower vertical resolution, to allow more time for the next row of graphics to be prepared. Later games, such as Pitfall!, change the visuals for each scan line or extend the black areas around the screen to extend the game code's processing time.

Regional releases of the Atari 2600 use modified TIA chips for each region's television formats, which require games to be developed and published separately for each region. All modes are 160 pixels wide. NTSC mode provides 192 visible lines per screen, drawn at 60 Hz, with 16 colors, each at 8 levels of brightness. PAL mode provides more vertical scanlines, with 228 visible lines per screen, but drawn at 50 Hz and only 13 colors. SECAM mode, also a 50 Hz format, is limited to 8 colors, each with only a single brightness level.

=== Controllers ===
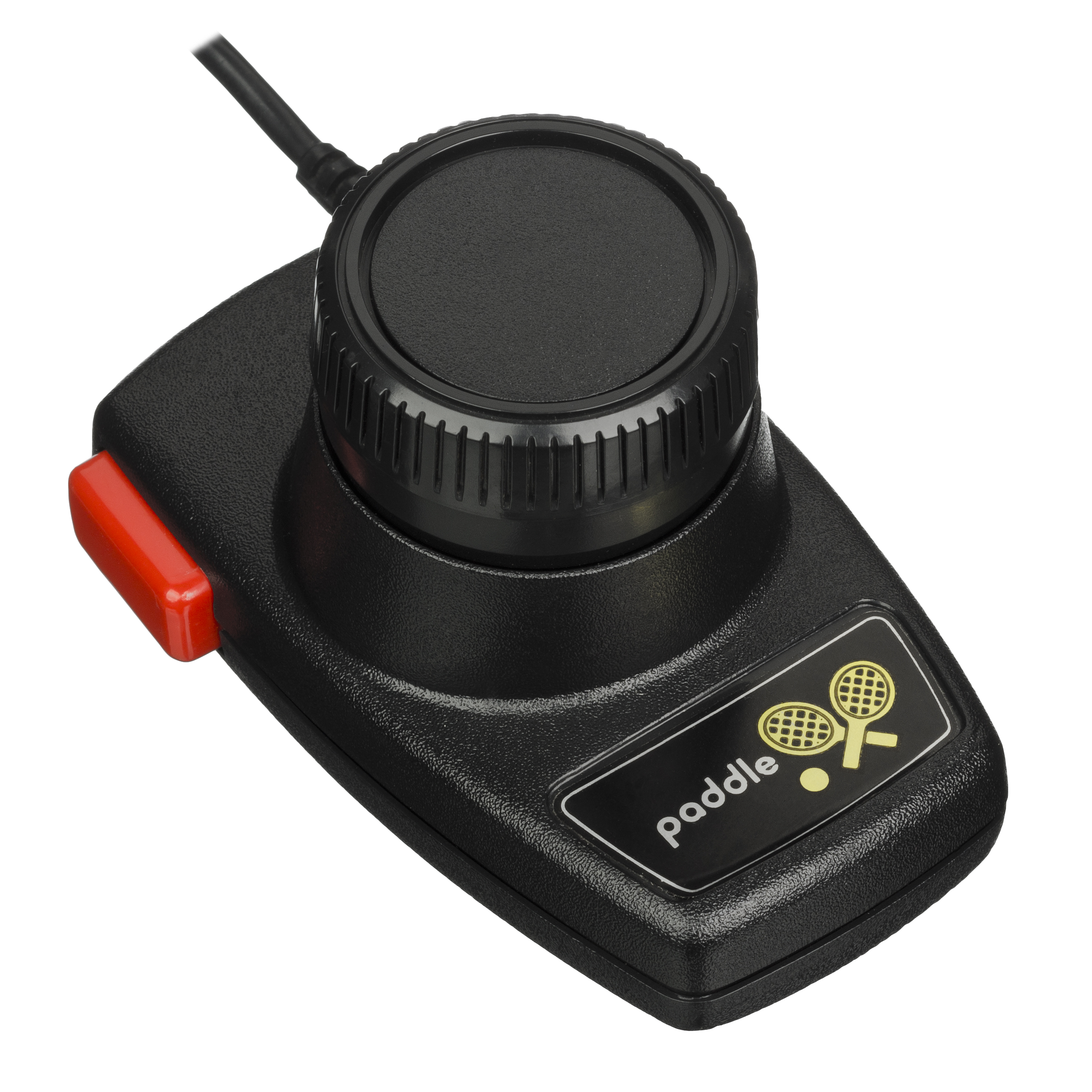
CX30 paddle

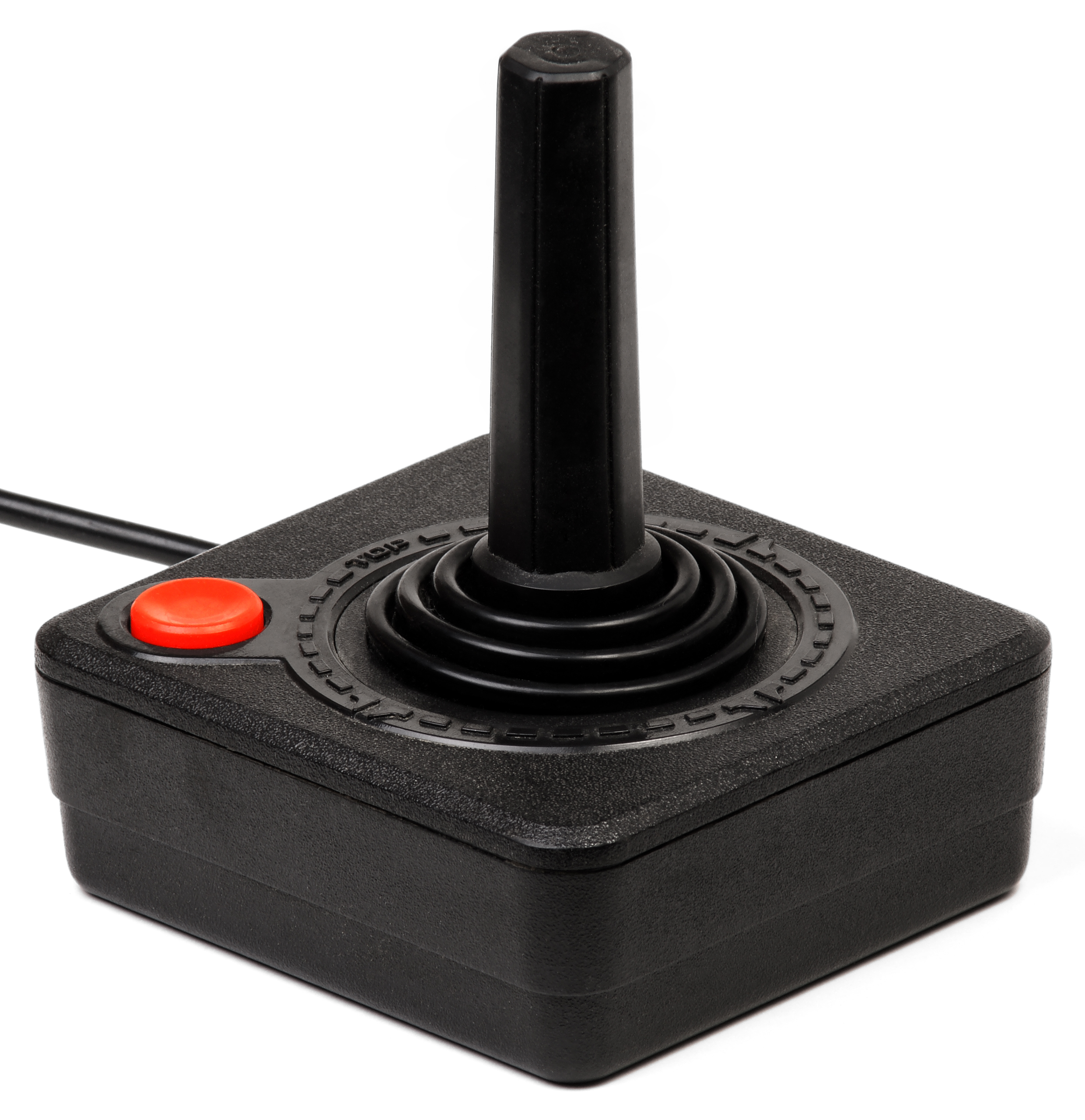
CX40 joystick

The first VCS bundle has two types of controllers: a joystick (part number CX10) and pair of rotary paddle controllers (CX30). Driving controllers, which are similar to paddle controllers but can be continuously rotated, shipped with the Indy 500 launch game. After less than a year, the CX10 joystick was replaced with the CX40 model designed by James C. Asher. Because the Atari joystick port and CX40 joystick became industry standards, 2600 joysticks and some other peripherals work with later systems, including the MSX, Commodore 64, Amiga, Atari 8-bit computers, and Atari ST. The CX40 joystick can be used with the Master System and Sega Genesis, but does not provide all the buttons of a native controller. Third-party controllers include Wico's Command Control joystick. Later, the CX42 Remote Control Joysticks, similar in appearance but using wireless technology, were released, together with a receiver whose wires could be inserted in the controller jacks.

Atari introduced the CX50 Keyboard Controller in June 1978 along with two games that require it: Codebreaker and Hunt & Score. The similar, but simpler, CX23 Kid's Controller was released later for a series of games aimed at a younger audience. The CX22 Trak-Ball controller was announced in January 1983 and is compatible with the Atari 8-bit computers.

There were two attempts to turn the Atari 2600 into a keyboard-equipped home computer: Atari's never-released CX3000 "Graduate" keyboard, and the CompuMate keyboard by Spectravideo which was released in 1983.

== Console models ==
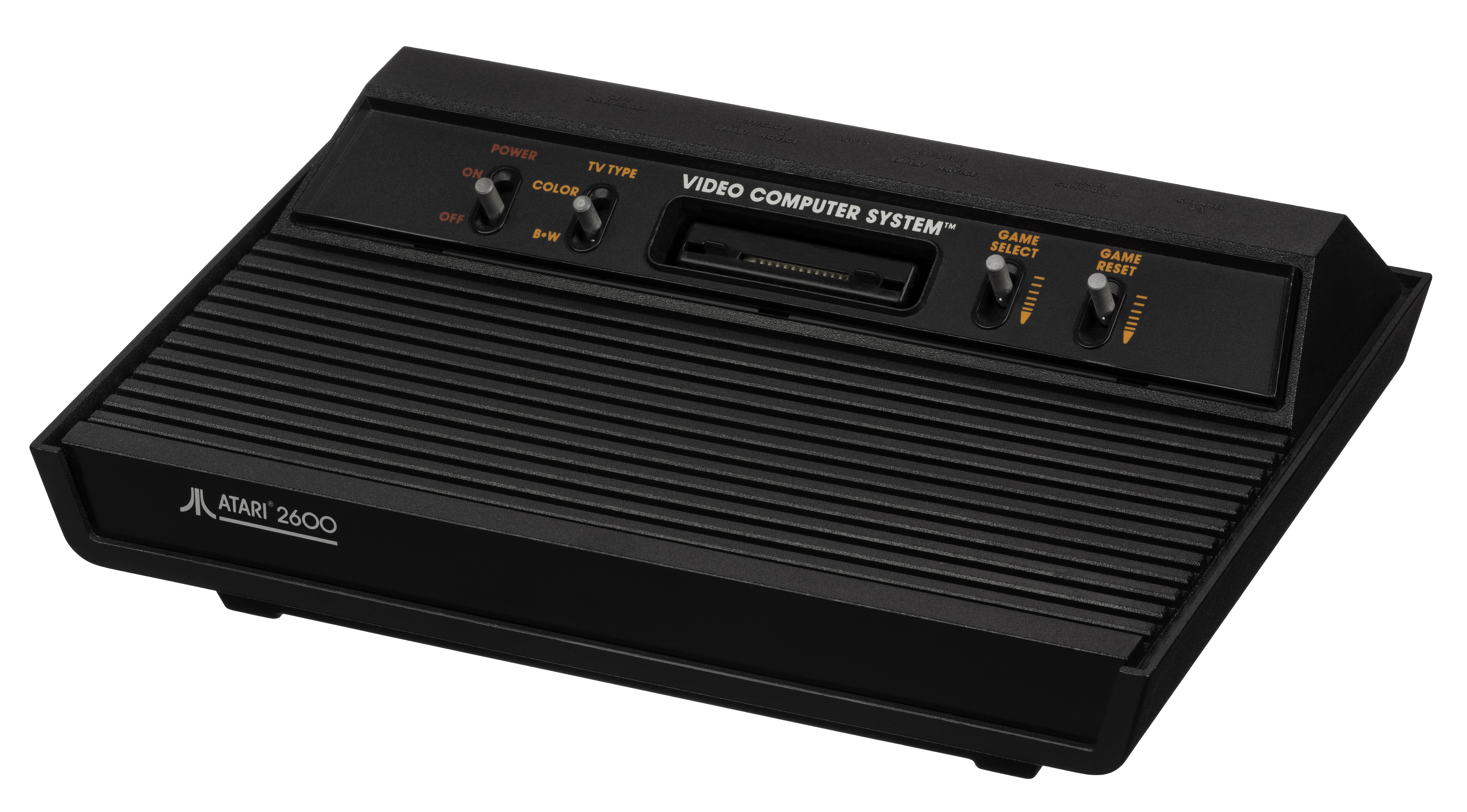
The all-black model that first used the Atari 2600 name (released in November 1982)

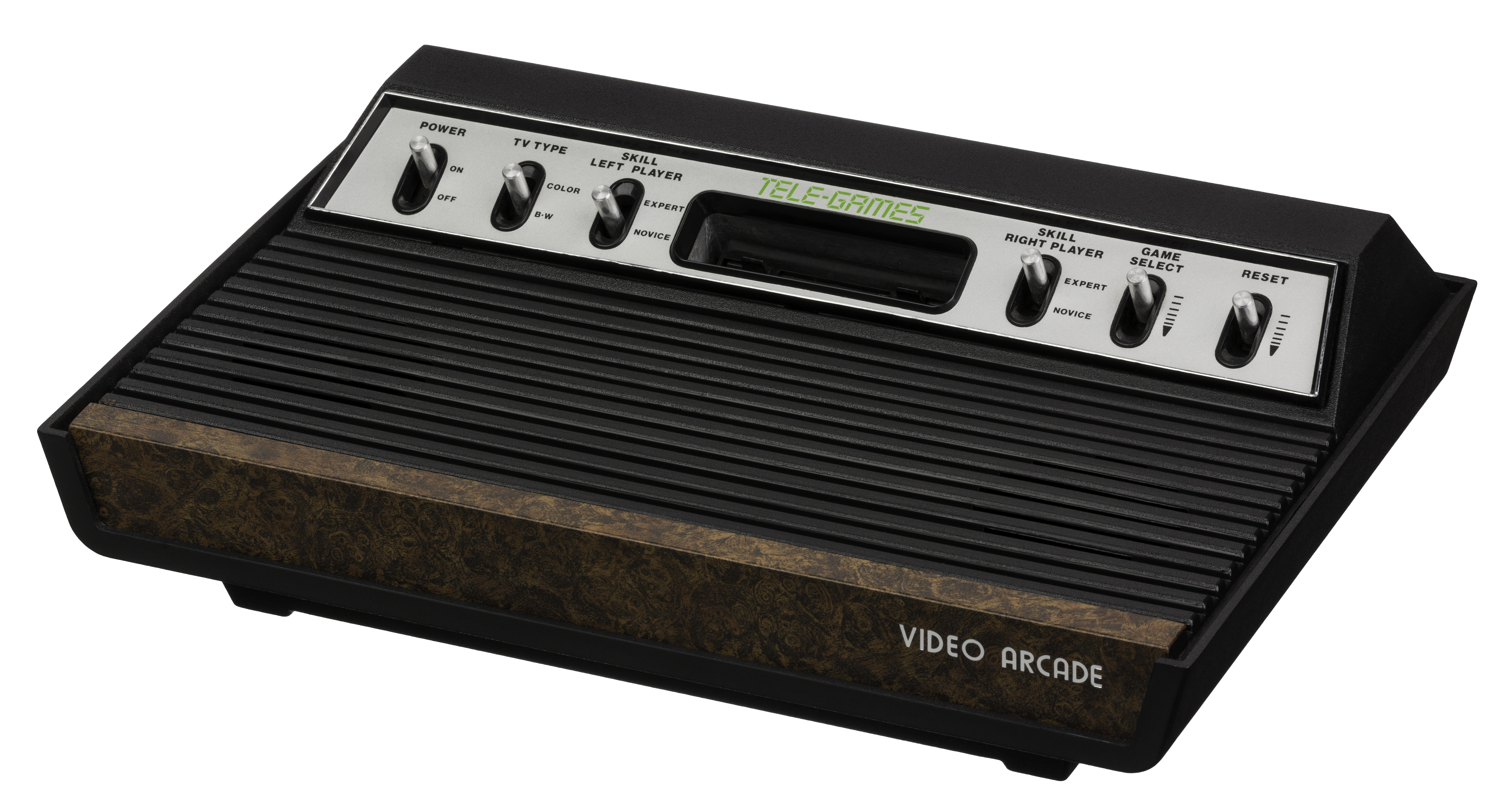
Sears rebranded the VCS as the "Video Arcade" for its Tele-Games line.

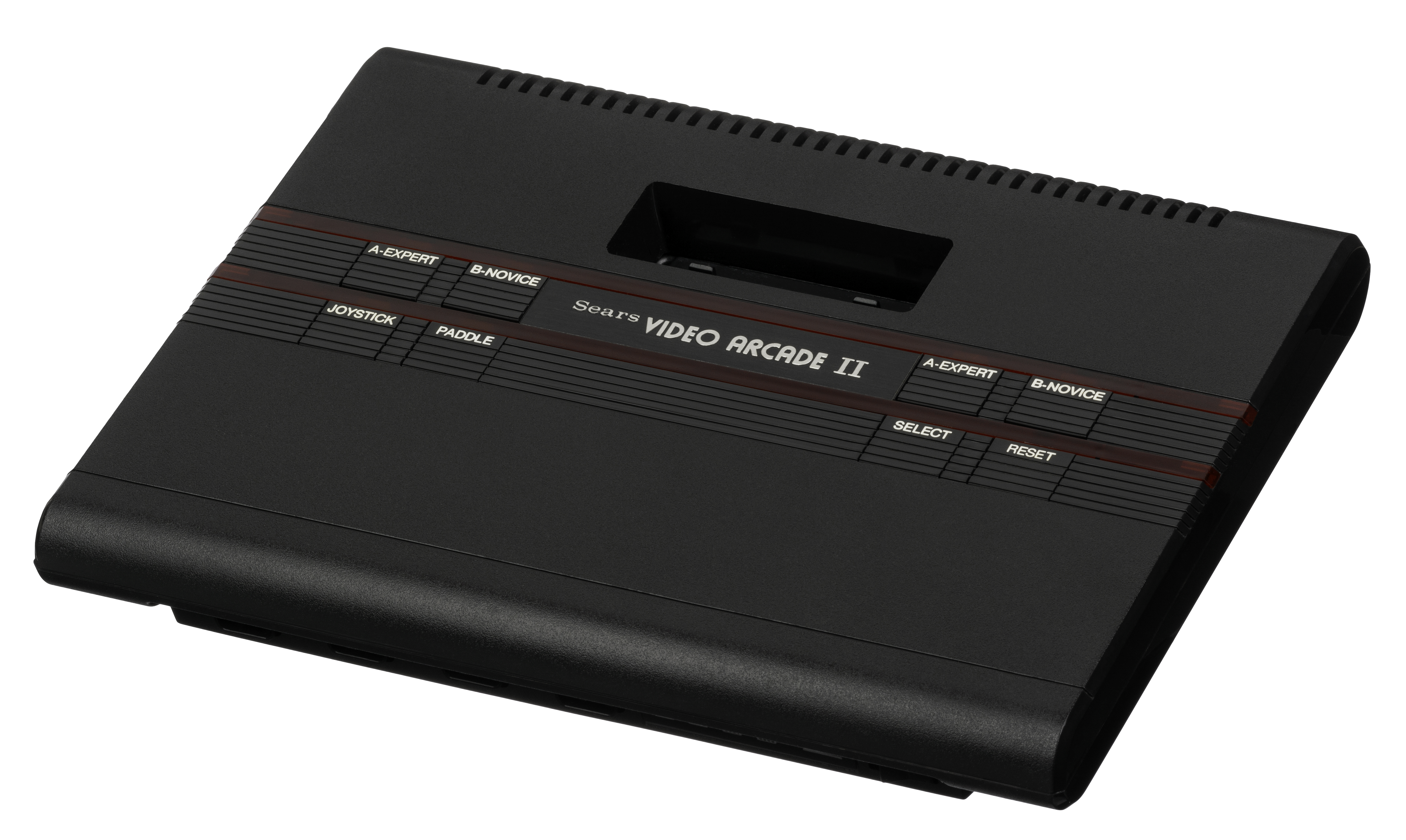
The design of the Japan-only Atari 2800 was previously used in the US for the Sears Video Arcade II.

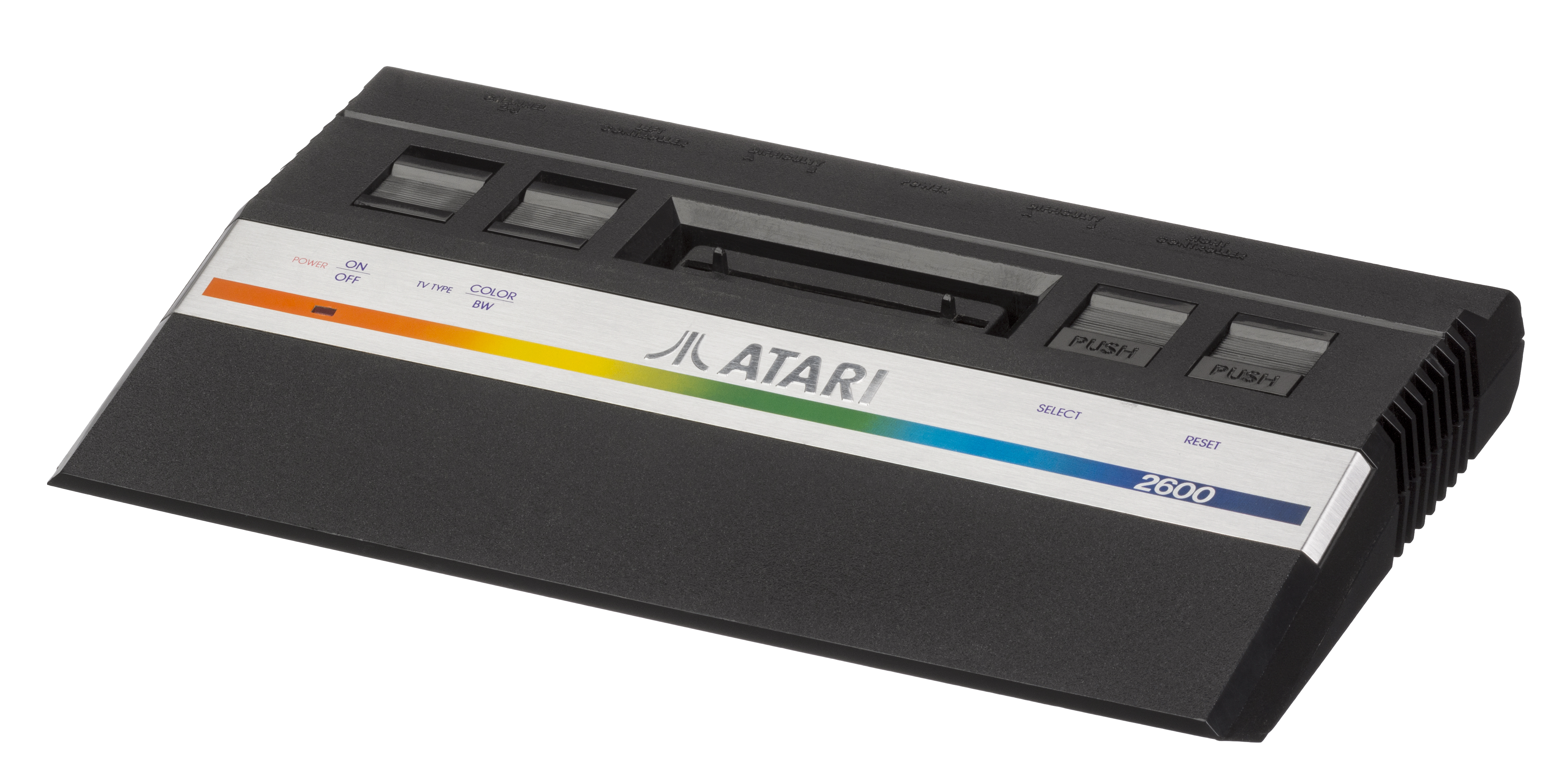
The 1986 cost-reduced version, nicknamed "2600 Jr."

=== Minor revisions ===
The initial production of the VCS was made in Sunnyvale during 1977, using thick polystyrene plastic for the casing as to give the impression of weight from what was mostly an empty shell inside. The initial Sunnyvale batch had also included potential mounts for an internal speaker system on the casing, though the speakers were found to be too expensive to include; instead sound was routed through the TIA to the connected television. All six console switches were mounted on the front panel. Production of the unit was moved to Taiwan in 1978, where a less thick internal metal shielding was used and thinner plastic was used for the casing, reducing the system's weight. These two versions are commonly referred to as "Heavy Sixers" and "Light Sixers" respectively, referencing the six front switches.

In 1980, the difficulty switches were moved to the back of the console, leaving four switches on the front and replacing the previous all lowercase font for the switch labels to fully capitalized wording. Otherwise, these four-switch consoles look nearly identical to the earlier six-switch models. In 1982, to coincide with the release of the Atari 5200, Atari rebranded the console as the "Atari 2600", a name first used on a version of the four-switch model without woodgrain, giving it an all-black appearance. This all-black model is commonly referred to by fans as the "Vader" model, due to its resemblance to the Star Wars character of the same name.

=== Sears Video Arcade ===
Atari continued its OEM relationship with Sears under the latter's Tele-Games brand, which started in 1975 with the original Pong. This is unrelated to the company Telegames, which later produced 2600 cartridges. Sears released several models of the VCS as the Sears Video Arcade series starting in 1977. The final Sears-specific model was the Video Arcade II, released during the fall of 1982.

Sears released versions of Atari's games with Tele-Games branding, usually with different titles. Three games were produced by Atari for Sears as exclusive releases: Steeplechase, Stellar Track, and Submarine Commander.

=== Atari 2800 ===
The Atari 2800 is the Japanese version of the 2600 released in October 1983. It is the first Japan-specific release of a 2600, though companies like Epoch had distributed the 2600 in Japan previously. The 2800 was released a short time after Nintendo's Family Computer (which became the dominant console in Japan), and it did not gain a significant share of the market. Sears previously released the 2800 in the US during late 1982 as the Sears Video Arcade II, which came packaged with two controllers and Space Invaders. The system launched in May 1983 with 25 specifically branded games. Around 35 games were released for the 2800.

Designed by engineer Joe Tilly, the 2800 has four controller ports instead of the two of the 2600. The controllers are an all-in one design using a combination of an 8-direction digital joystick and a 270-degree paddle, designed by John Amber. The 2800's case design departed from the 2600, using a wedge shape with non-protruding switches. The case style is the basis for the Atari 7800, which was redesigned for the 7800 by Barney Huang.

=== 1986 model ===
The cost-reduced 1986 model, sometimes referred to as the "2600 Jr.", has a smaller form factor with an Atari 7800-like appearance. It was advertised as a budget gaming system (under $50) with the ability to run a large collection of games. Released after the video game crash of 1983, and after the North American launch of the Nintendo Entertainment System, the 2600 was supported with new games and television commercials promoting "The fun is back!". Atari released several minor stylistic variations: the "large rainbow" (shown), "short rainbow", and an all-black version sold only in Ireland. Later European versions include a joypad.

=== Unreleased prototypes ===
The Atari 2700 was a version of the 2600 with wireless controllers.

The CX2000, with integrated joystick controllers, was a redesign based on human factor analysis by Henry Dreyfuss Associates.

The circa-1982 Atari 3200 was a backwards compatible 2600 successor with "more memory, higher resolution graphics and improved sound".

=== Related hardware and recreations ===
The Atari 7800, announced in 1984 and released in 1986, is the official successor to the Atari 2600 and is backward compatible with 2600 cartridges.

Multiple retro-style consoles and microconsoles have been released since the lifespan of the original Atari 2600:

- The TV Boy includes 127 games in an enlarged joypad.
- The Atari Classics 10-in-1 TV Game, manufactured by Jakks Pacific, emulates the 2600 with ten games inside an Atari-style joystick with composite-video output.
- The Atari Flashback 2 (2005) contains 40 games, with four additional programs unlocked by a cheat code. It uses a recreated chip based on original 2600 hardware, and is compatible with original 2600 controllers. It can be modified to play original 2600 cartridges.
- In 2017, Hyperkin announced the RetroN 77, a clone of the Atari 2600 that plays original cartridges instead of preinstalled games.
- The Atari VCS (2021 console) can download and emulate 2600 games via an online store.
- The Atari Flashback 12 Gold (2023) contains 130 games built-in.
- The Atari 2600+ (2023) is a replica of the 2600 and is 20% smaller. The 2600+ includes support for original Atari 2600 and 7800 cartridges.
- The Atari 7800+ (2024) is a smaller replica of the Atari 7800. It has similar features to the Atari 2600+, but its exterior encasing design pays homage to the Atari 7800.

== Games ==
Decuir estimated that six to eight cartridges were sold per console, double Atari's initial estimate. In 1977, nine games were released on cartridge to accompany the launch of the console: Air-Sea Battle, Basic Math, Blackjack, Combat, Indy 500, Star Ship, Street Racer, Surround, and Video Olympics. Indy 500 shipped with special "driving controllers", which are like paddles but rotate freely. Street Racer and Video Olympics use the standard paddle controllers. Atari, Inc. was the only developer for the first few years, releasing dozens of games.

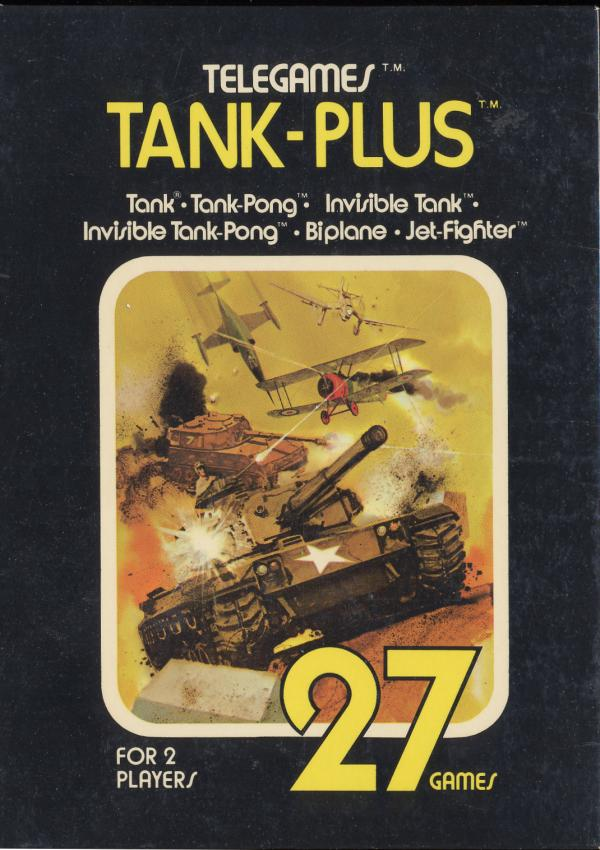
Cover art for Atari 2600 games were aimed to capture the player's imagination and obviate the low fidelity of game graphics.

Atari determined that box art featuring only descriptions of the game and screenshots would not be sufficient to sell games in retail stores, since most games were based on abstract principles and screenshots give little information. Atari outsourced box art to Cliff Spohn, who created visually interesting artwork with implications of dynamic movement intended to engage the player's imagination while staying true to the gameplay. Spohn's style became a standard for Atari when bringing in assistant artists, including Susan Jaekel, Rick Guidice, John Enright, and Steve Hendricks. Spohn and Hendricks were the largest contributors to the covers in the Atari 2600 library. Ralph McQuarrie, a concept artist on the Star Wars series, was commissioned for one cover, the arcade conversion of Vanguard. These artists generally conferred with the programmer to learn about the game before drawing the art.

An Atari VCS port of the Breakout arcade game appeared in 1978. The original is in black and white with a colored overlay, and the home version is in color. In 1980, Atari released Adventure, the first action-adventure game, and the first home game with a hidden Easter egg.

Rick Maurer's port of Taito's Space Invaders, released in 1980, was the first VCS game to sell a million copies—eventually doubling that within a year and totaling more than 6 million cartridges by 1983. It became the killer app to drive console sales. Versions of Atari's own Asteroids and Missile Command arcade games, released in 1981, were also major hits.

Launch games use 2K ROMs. 4K eventually became standard with games such as Space Invaders. The VCS port of Asteroids (1981) was the first game for the system to use 8K via a bank switching technique between two 4K segments. Some games, including Atari's ports of Dig Dug and Crystal Castles, are 16K cartridges. One of the final games, Fatal Run (1990), doubled this to 32K.

Many early VCS titles were able to display in both monochrome (black and white) and full color through the use of the "TV type" switch on the console. This allowed the VCS games to function on both monochrome and color televisions. However, beginning around the rebranding from "VCS" to "2600", support for black and white display modes diminished greatly, with most releases during this period only displaying in color and the TV type switch serving no function. Late releases such as Secret Quest, began using the TV type switch for gameplay functions, such as pausing.

Two Atari-published games, both from the system's peak in 1982, E.T. the Extra-Terrestrial and Pac-Man, were rushed to market and are cited as factors in the video game crash of 1983.

A company named American Multiple Industries produced a number of pornographic games for the 2600 under the Mystique Presents Swedish Erotica label. The most notorious, Custer's Revenge, was protested by women's and Native American groups because it depicted General George Armstrong Custer raping a bound Native American woman. Atari sued American Multiple Industries in court over the release of the game.

== Legacy ==
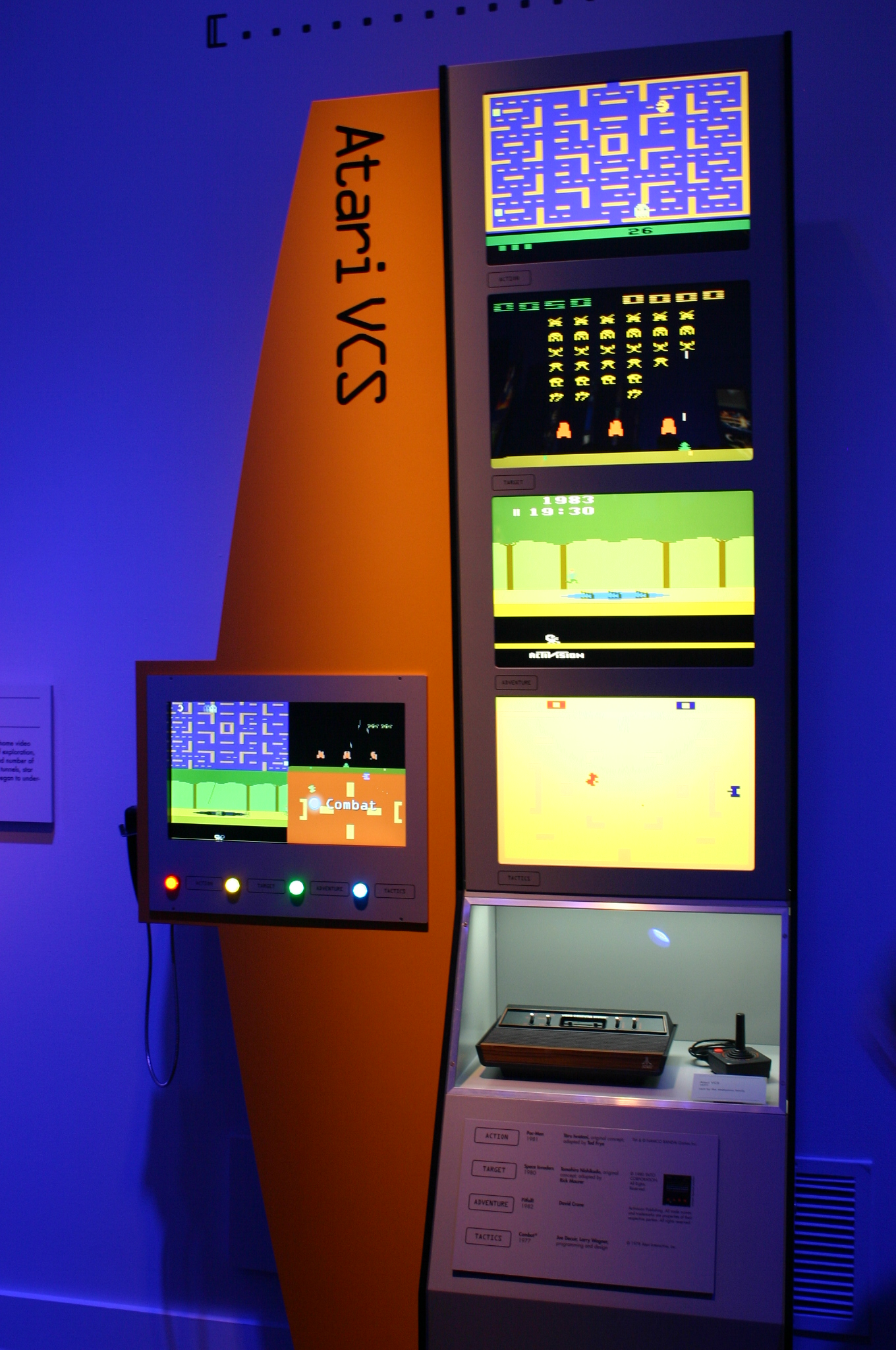
"The Art of Video Games" (2012) at the Smithsonian American Art Museum, with Pac-Man, Space Invaders, Pitfall!, and Combat

The 2600 was so successful in the late 1970s and early 1980s that "Atari" was a synonym for the console in mainstream media and for video games in general. Atari defeated rivals like Channel F, Decuir said, because it was an entertainment company with extensive arcade-game experience. While noting that Bushnell and Alcorn disagreed, he believed that using the 28-pin 6507 and 24-pin cartridge slot was a mistake; had Atari used the 40-pin 6502, and a 40-pin cartridge slot, the company could have evolved the design into a backwards-compatible computer. Miner directed the creation of the successors to the 2600's TIA chip—CTIA and ANTIC—used in the non-compatible Atari 8-bit computers released in 1979 and later the 5200 console.

The Atari 2600 was inducted into the National Toy Hall of Fame at The Strong in Rochester, New York, in 2007. In 2009, the Atari 2600 was named the number two console of all time by IGN, which cited its remarkable role behind both the first video game boom and the video game crash of 1983, and called it "the console that our entire industry is built upon".

In November 2021, the current incarnation of Atari announced three 2600 games to be published under "Atari XP" label: Yars' Return, Aquaventure, and Saboteur. These were previously included in Atari Flashback consoles.

A model of the Atari 2600 was released by Lego in 2022. Included are the three games Asteroid, Centipede, and Adventure. Included is a minifigure with a bedroom designed from the 1980s.
