= List of retro style video game consoles =

This is a list of retro style video game consoles in chronological order. Only officially licensed consoles are listed.

Starting in the 2000s, the trend of retrogaming spawned the launch of several new consoles that usually imitate the styling of pre-2000s home consoles and only play games that released on those consoles. Most retro style consoles are dedicated consoles, but many have an SD card slot that allows the user to add additional games, an internet connection that allows users to download games, or even support the cartridges of older video game systems. Most of these consoles do not feature the original hardware and are thus equipped with a modern microprocessor, prominently an ARM CPU and supporting chips running an emulator to allow the rendering of the particular system.

== List ==
=== Retro style home consoles (2001–present) ===
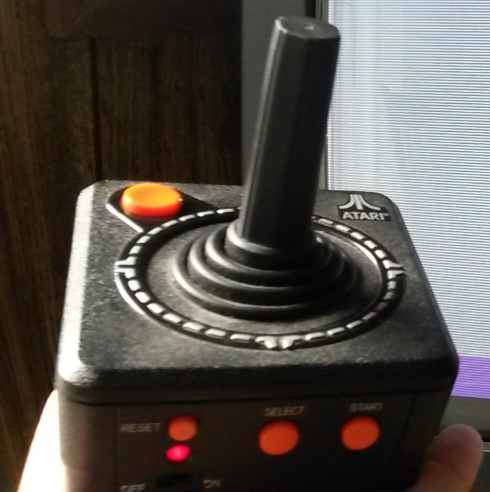
Atari 10 in 1 TV Games (2002)

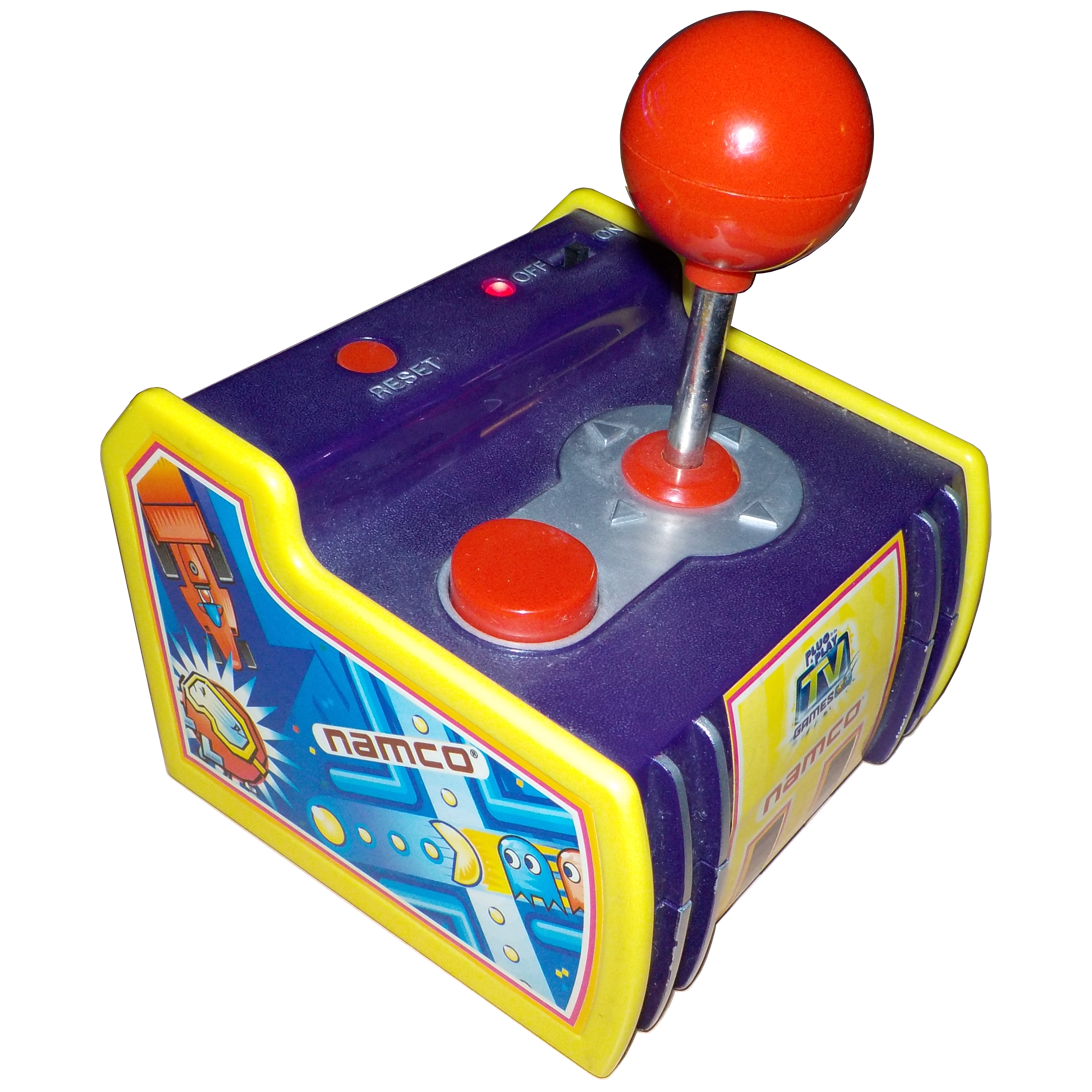
The Namco Plug and Play console (2003)

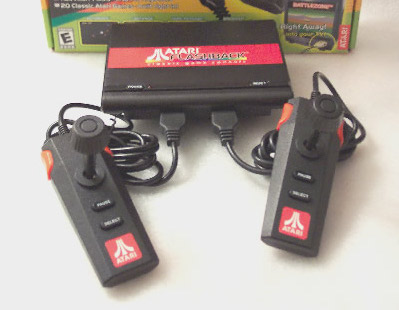
Atari Flashback (2004)

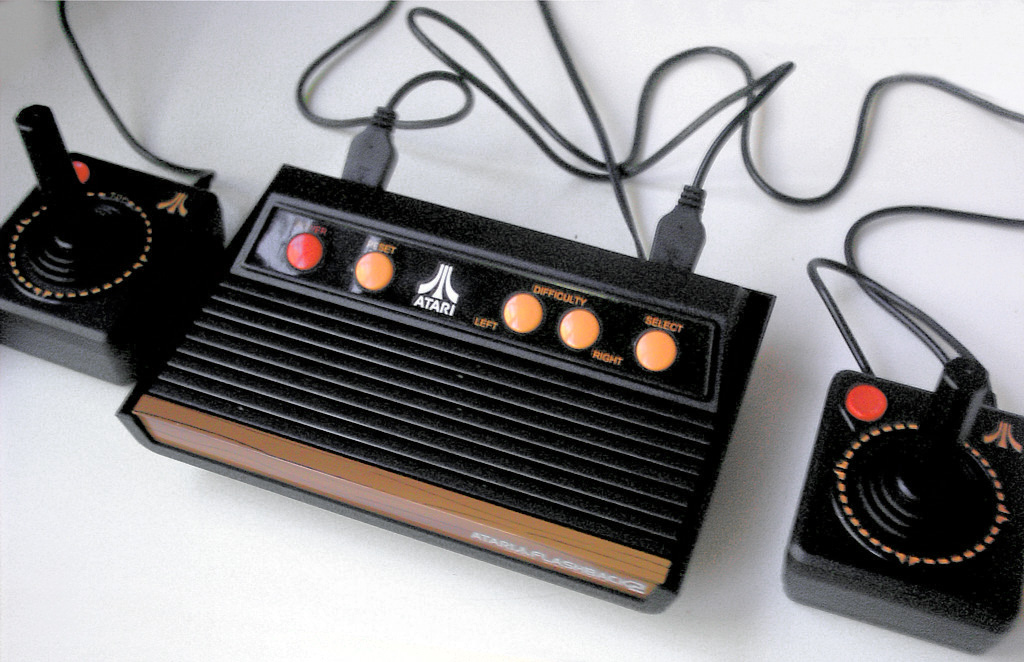
Atari Flashback 2 (2004)

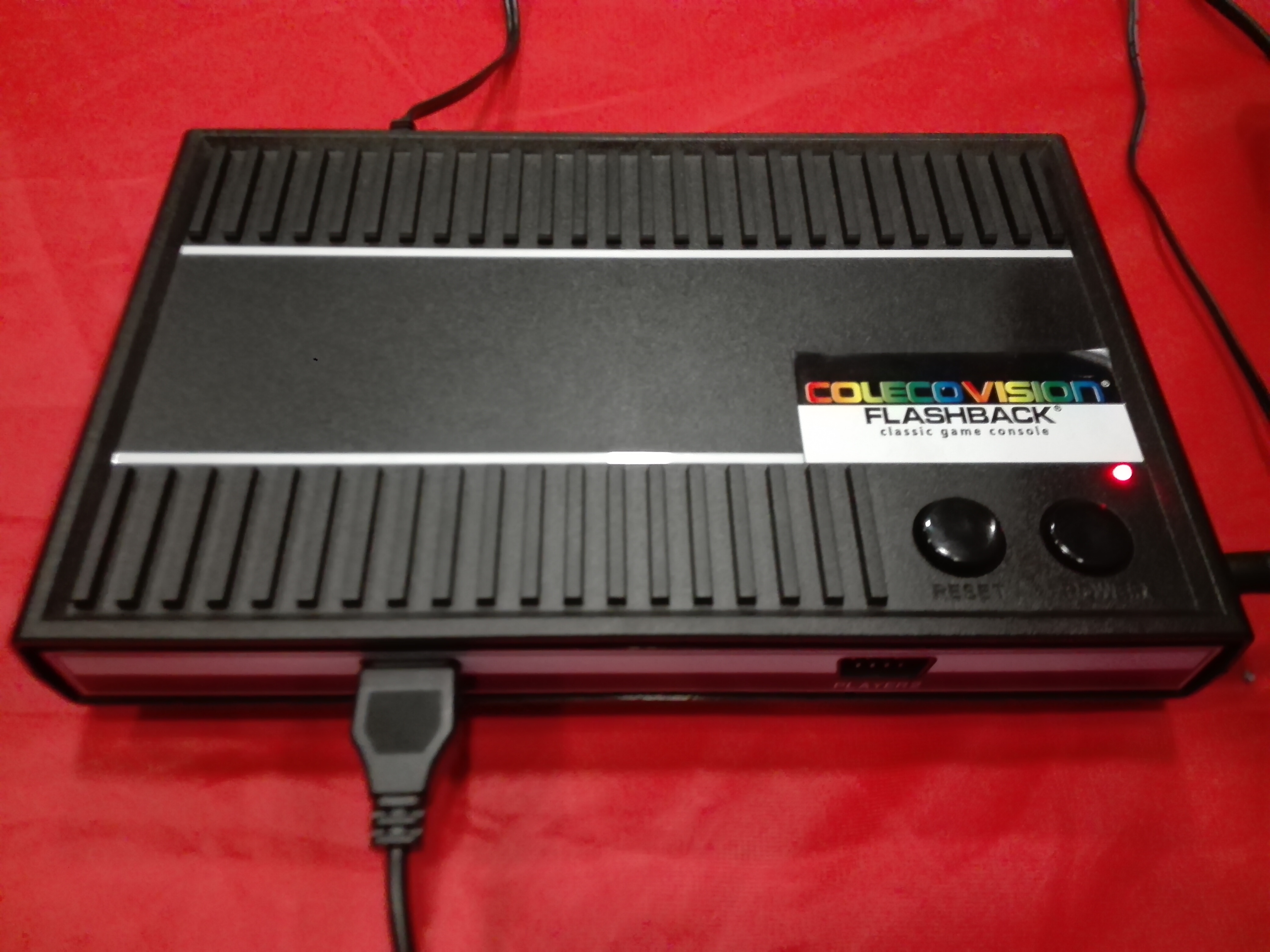
ColecoVision Flashback (2014)

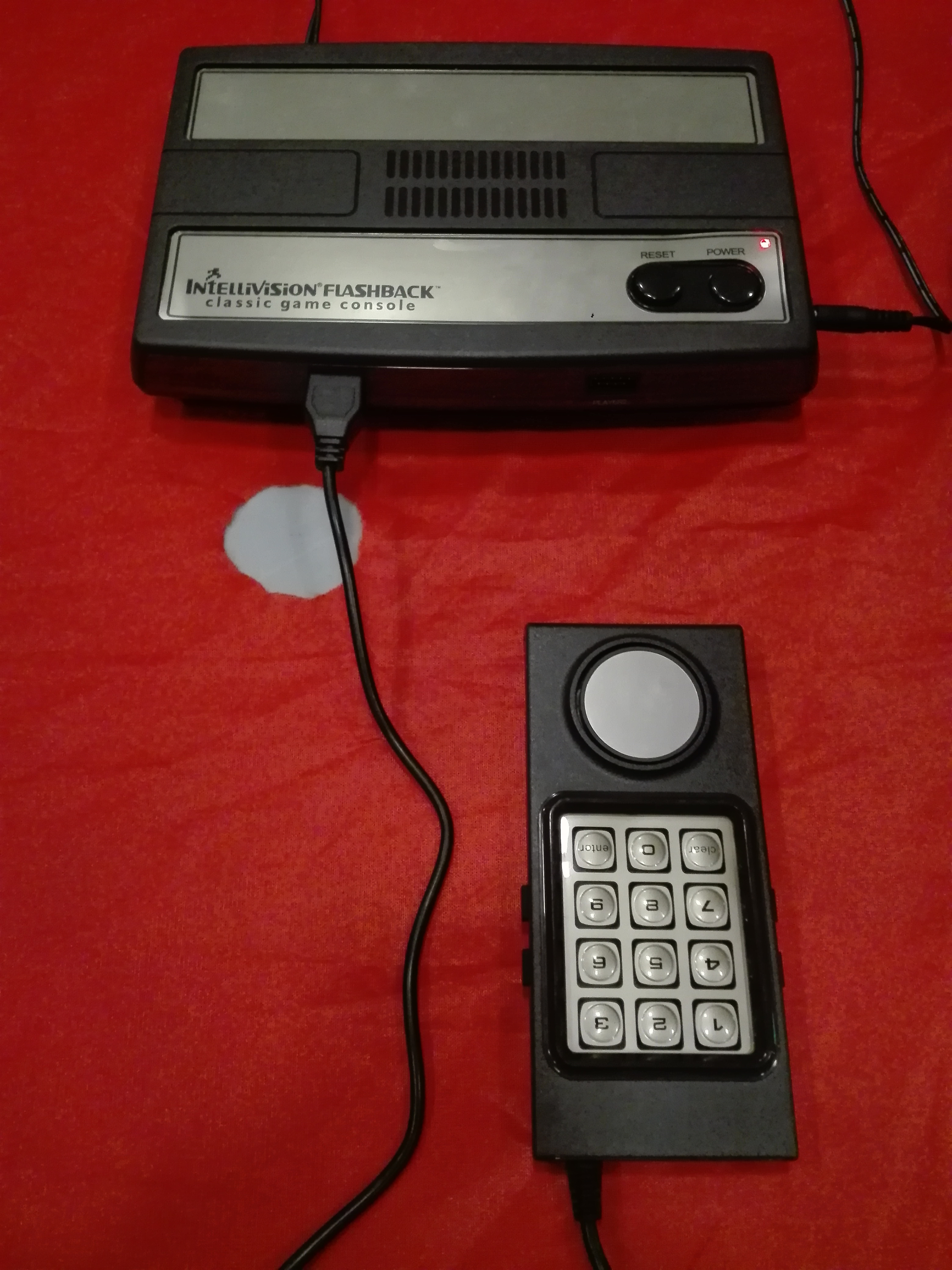
Intellivision Flashback (2014)

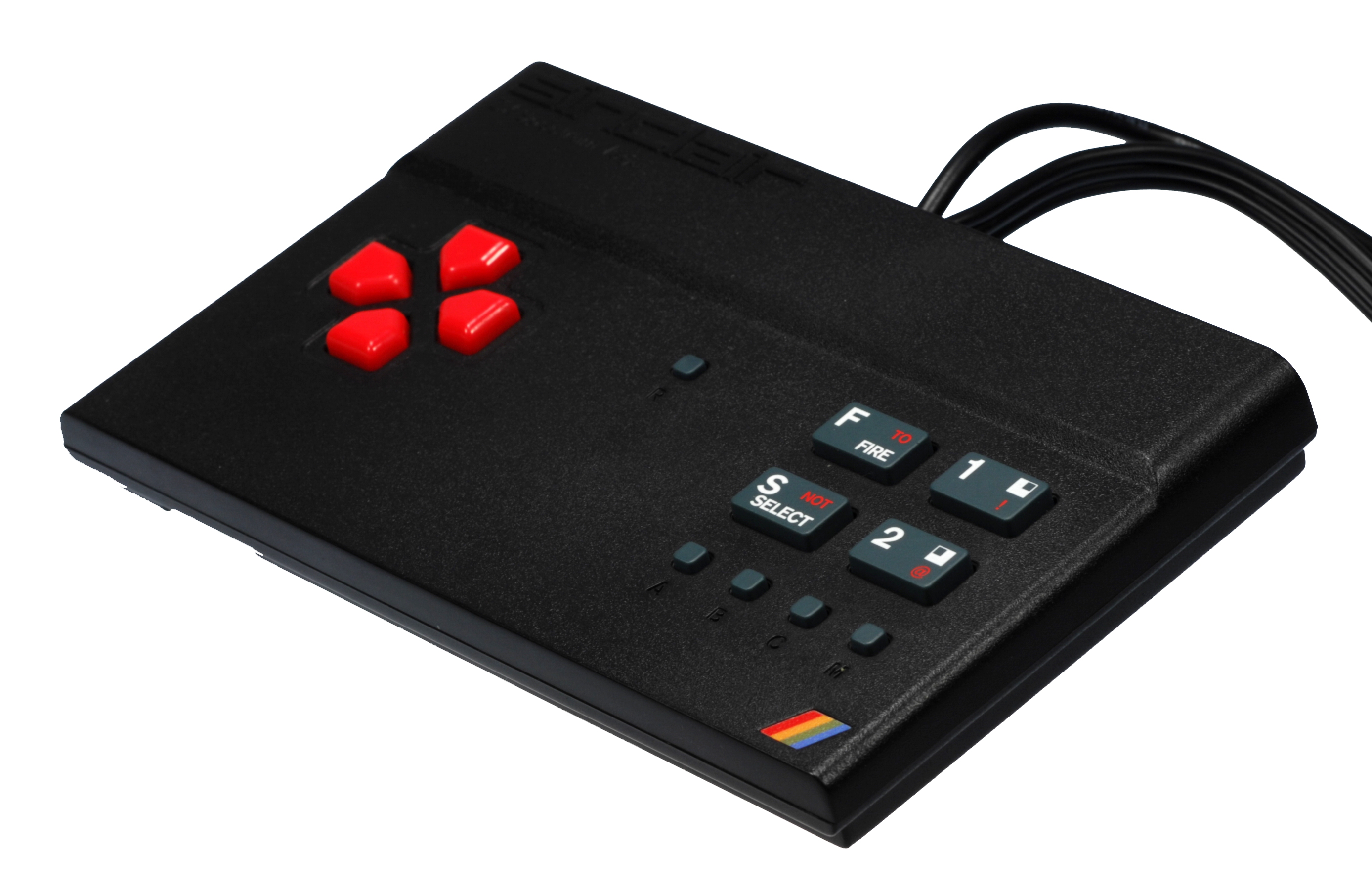
ZX Spectrum Vega (2015)

==== Dedicated retro style home consoles (2001–present) ====
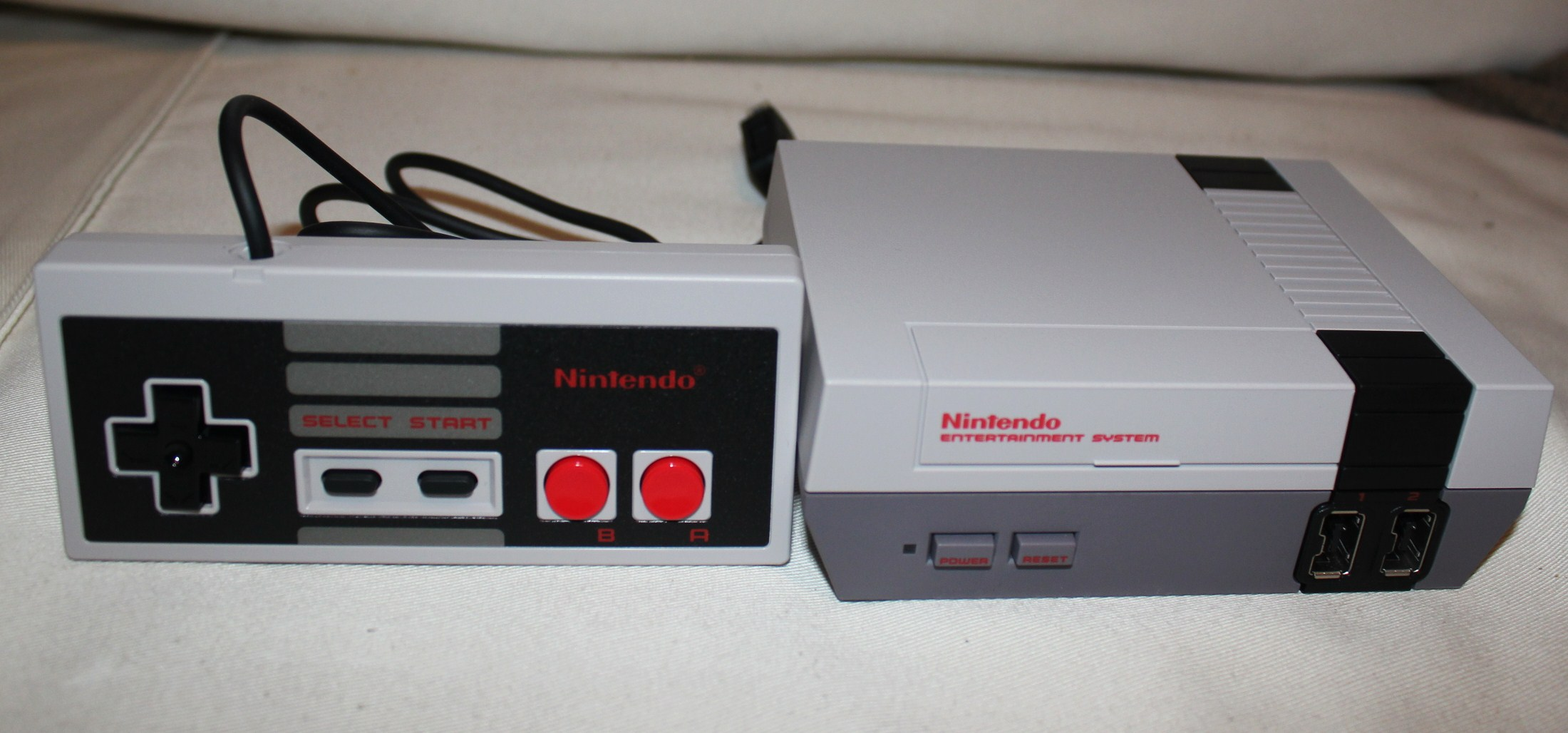
Nintendo Entertainment System: NES Classic Edition (2016)

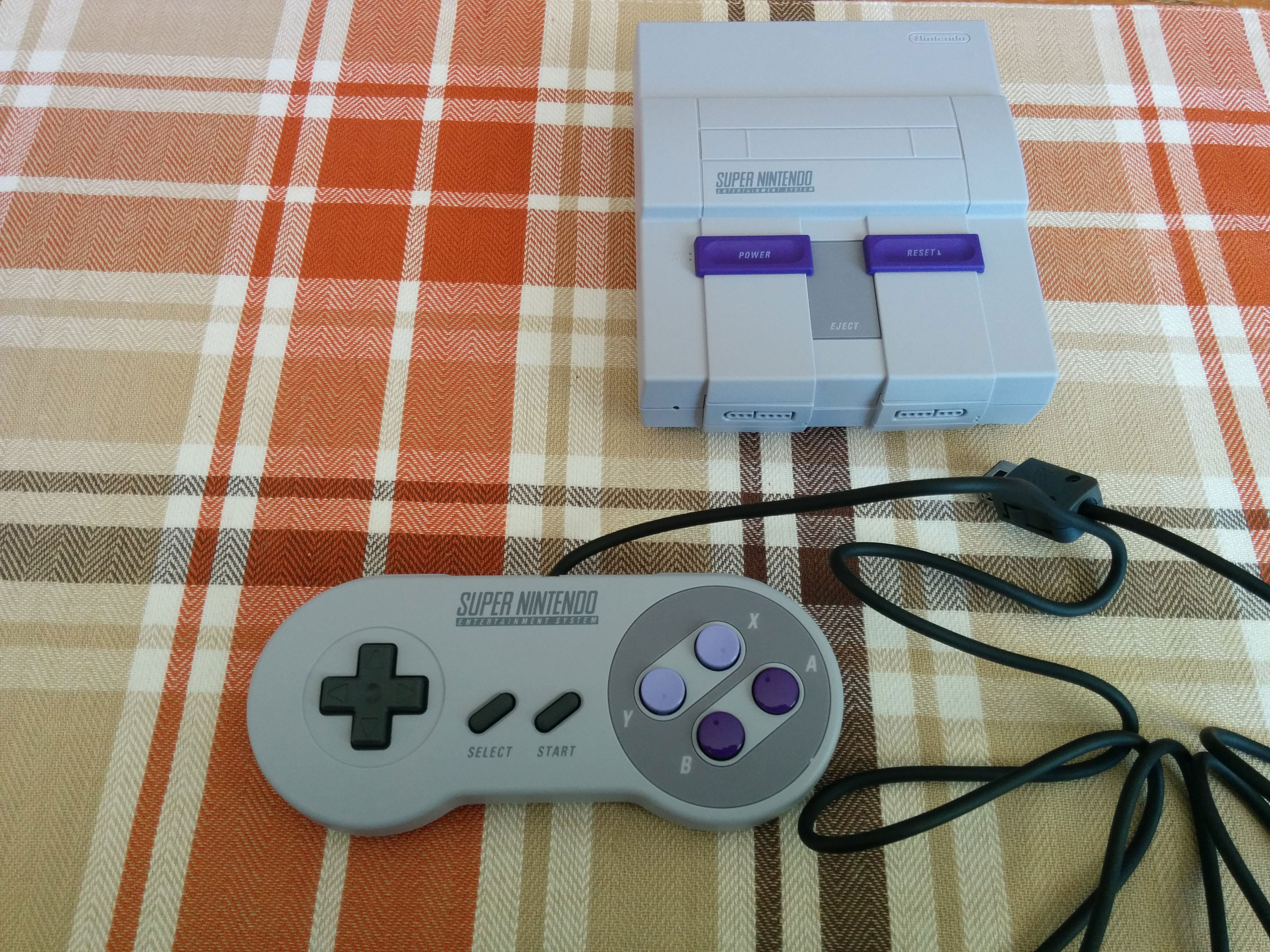
Super Nintendo Entertainment System: Super NES Classic Edition (2017)

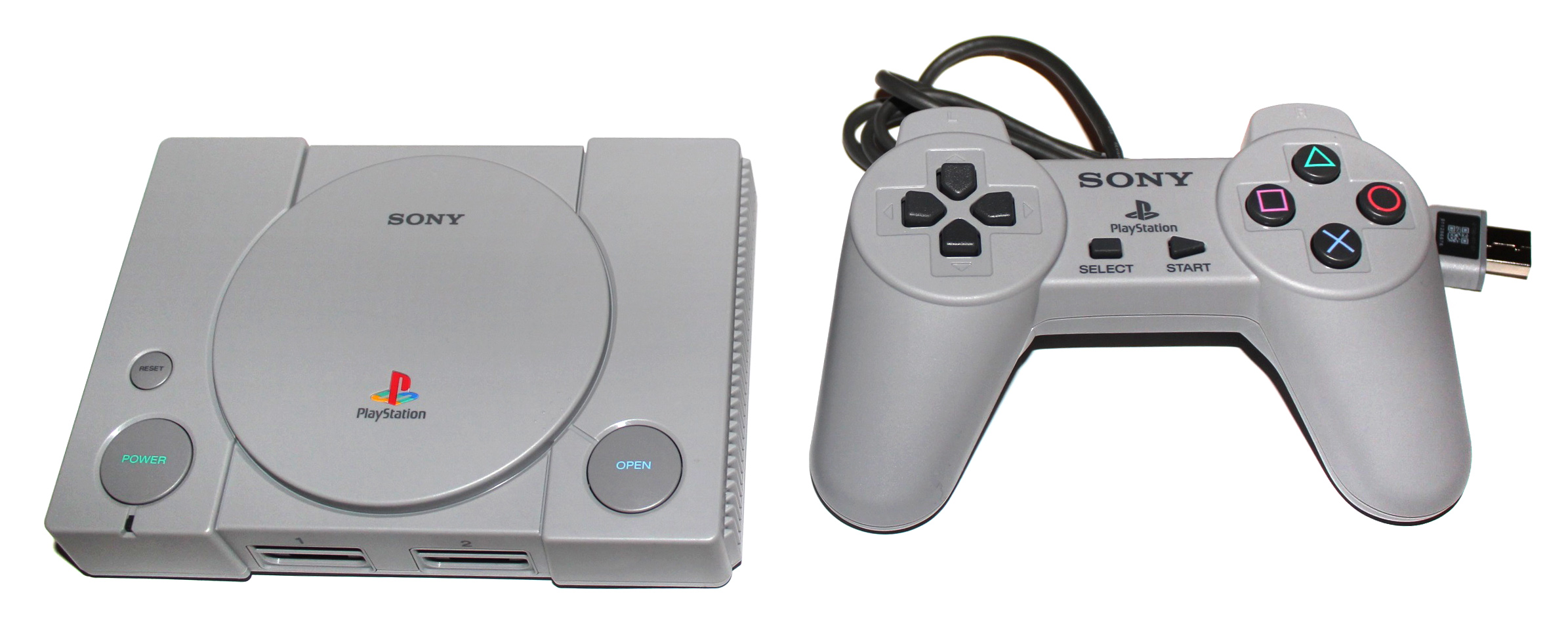
PlayStation Classic (2018)

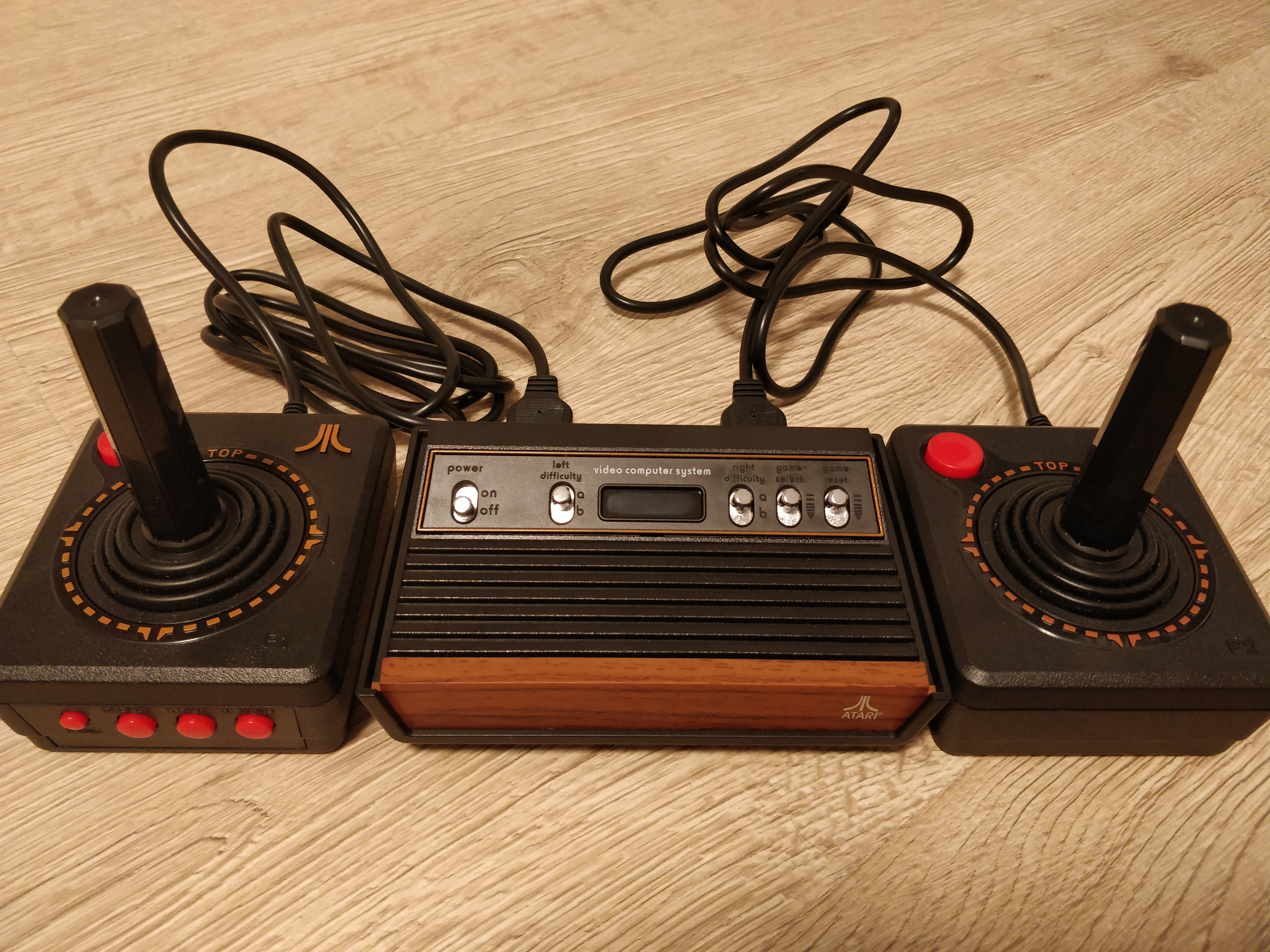
Atari Flashback X (2019)

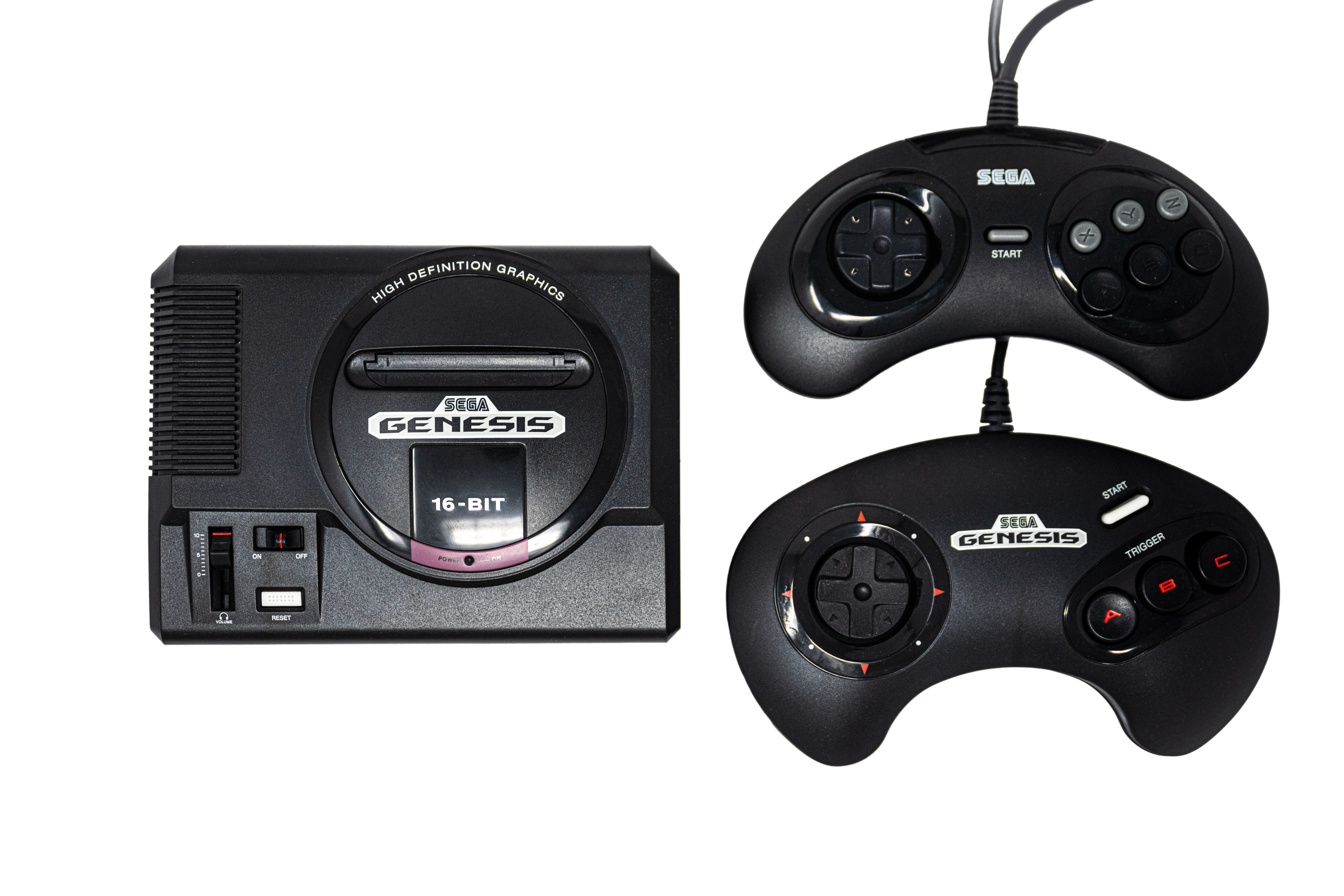
Sega Genesis Mini (2019)

Name	Release date	Manufacturer
Activision TV Games gamepad controller	2001	Toymax International
Atari Joystick Controller	2002	Jakks Pacific
Intellivision 25 TV Play Power	2003	Techno Source
Intellivision 10 TV Play Power	2003	Techno Source
Namco Pac-Man	2003	Jakks Pacific
Namco Ms. Pac-Man and Friends!	2003	Jakks Pacific
Atari Paddle Controller	2004	Jakks Pacific
Activision TV Games joystick controller	2004	Jakks Pacific
C64 Direct-to-TV	2004	Mammoth Toys / Toy:Lobster
Konami Collector's Series: Arcade Advanced TV Arcade	2004	Majesco
Arcade Legends: Space Invaders	2004	Radica Games
Atari Flashback	2004	Atari
Atari Flashback 2	2005	Atari
Capcom 3-in-1	2005	Jakks Pacific
Intellivision 10 2nd Edition TV Play Power	2005	Techno Source
Intellivision X2 15 TV Play Power	2005	Techno Source
Namco Ms. Pac-Man Super Gamekey Mega Pack	2005	Jakks Pacific
Sega Mega Drive/Genesis PlayTV Legends	2005	Radica Games
Sega Mega Drive/Genesis PlayTV Legends Volume II	2005	Radica Games
Activision 10-in-1	2006	Techno Source
Super Pac-Man Collection	2006	Jakks Pacific
Arcade Gamer/Poga/DPG-350/Master System Portátil	2007	AtGames
Arcade Gold featuring Pac-Man	2007	Jakks Pacific
Mega Drive Twin Pads/DPG-450	2008	AtGames / Blaze Europe
Retro Arcade featuring Pac-Man	2008	Jakks Pacific
Master System Evolution	2009	Tectoy
Atari Flashback 2+	2010	Atari
Arcade Motion Dual	2010	AtGames
Atari Flashback 3	2011	AtGames
Retro Arcade featuring Space Invaders	2011	Jakks Pacific
Atari Flashback 4	2012	AtGames
Pac-Man Connect and Play	2012	Bandai Namco Entertainment
Atari Flashback 64	2013	AtGames
Atari Flashback 5	2014	AtGames
ColecoVision Flashback	2014	AtGames
Intellivision Flashback	2014	AtGames
Atari Flashback 6	2015	AtGames
Atari Flashback 7	2016	AtGames
Nintendo Entertainment System: NES Classic Edition	2016	Nintendo
Nintendo Classic Mini: Family Computer	2016	Nintendo
Retro-Bit Generations	2016	Retro-Bit
Atari 2600 Plug & Play joystick controller	2017	Basic Fun
Atari Flashback 8	2017	AtGames
Super Nintendo Entertainment System: Super NES Classic Edition	2017	Nintendo
Nintendo Classic Mini: Super Famicom	2017	Nintendo
PasocomMini MZ-80C	2017	HAL Laboratory
Super Retro-Cade	2017	Retro-Bit
Atari Flashback 9	2018	AtGames
THEC64 Mini (Commodore 64 Mini)	2018	Retro Games Ltd.
Midway Classic Arcade Classics Vol. 1	2018	MSI Entertainment, LLC
NEOGEO mini	2018	SNK Corporation
PlayStation Classic	2018	Sony
Zemmix Mini	2019	Team-Neo
Sega Mega Drive Mini	2019	Sega
Sega Genesis Mini	2019	Sega
Atari Flashback X	2019	AtGames
Capcom Home Arcade	2019	Capcom / Koch Media
NEOGEO Arcade Stick Pro	2019	SNK Corporation
THEC64 (Commodore 64 full size "Maxi" version)	2019	Retro Games Ltd.
Legends Flashback	2019	AtGames
PasocomMini PC-8001	2019	HAL Laboratory
PC Engine Mini	2020	Konami
TurboGrafx-16 Mini	2020	Konami
PC Engine CoreGrafx Mini	2020	Konami
THEVIC20 (VIC-20)	2020	Retro Games Ltd.
Astro City Mini	2020	Sega / Sega Toys
Mega Man Collection	2020	Arcade1Up
Pac-Man Collection	2020	Arcade1Up
Retro Station	2021	Capcom
Zemmix Super Mini	2021	Team-Neo
Taito Arcade Selection: Egret II Mini	2022	Taito
THEA500 Mini (Amiga 500 Mini)	2022	Retro Games Ltd.
Astro City Mini V	2022	Sega / Sega Toys
Sega Mega Drive Mini 2	2022	Sega
Sega Genesis Mini 2	2022	Sega
Atari Flashback 50th Anniversary Edition	2022	AtGames
Atari Flashback 12 Gold	2023	AtGames
Atari Gamestation Pro	2023	My Arcade / Atari
X68000 Z Limited Edition Early Access Kit / X68000 Z Product Edition Black Model	2023	Zuiki
DanceDanceRevolution Classic Mini	2024	Zuiki
THE400 Mini (Atari 400 Mini)	2024	Retro Games Ltd. / Atari
The Spectrum (ZX Spectrum)	2024	Retro Games Ltd.
PasocomMini PC-8801mkIISR	2025	Dempa Micomsoft
X68000 Z 2	2025	Zuiki
Vectrex Mini	2026	Flynn's Generation
THEA1200	2026	Retro Games Ltd.
THE800XL	2027	Retro Games Ltd.

==== Non-dedicated retro style home consoles (2008–present) ====
Name	Release date	Manufacturer
Retro Duo	2008	Retro-Bit
Arcade Motion Classic	2008	AtGames
Genesis Gencore	2009	AtGames
Analogue CMVS	2011	Analogue
RetroN 2 Gaming Console	2012	Hyperkin
Analogue Neo	2014	Analogue
Super Retro Trio	2014	Retro-Bit
RetroN 5: HD Gaming Console	2014	Hyperkin
Analogue Nt	2015	Analogue
Sega Genesis Classic Game Console	2016	AtGames
Sega Genesis Flashback	2017	AtGames
RetroN 77: HD Gaming Console	2017	Hyperkin
Super Nt	2018	Analogue
SupaRetroN HD Gaming Console	2018	Hyperkin
MegaRetroN HD Gaming Console	2018	Hyperkin
Mega Sg	2019	Analogue
Legends Core	2020	AtGames
RetroN 3 HD 3in1 Retro Gaming Console	2020	Hyperkin
Atari VCS	2021	Flex Ltd.
RetroN 1 AV Gaming Console	2021	Hyperkin
RetroN Sq: HD Gaming Console	2021	Hyperkin
Evercade VS	2021	Blaze Entertainment
Polymega	2021	Playmaji
Atari 2600+	2023	Plaion
Atari 7800+	2024	Plaion
M64	2026	ModRetro

=== Retro style handhelds (2001–present) ===
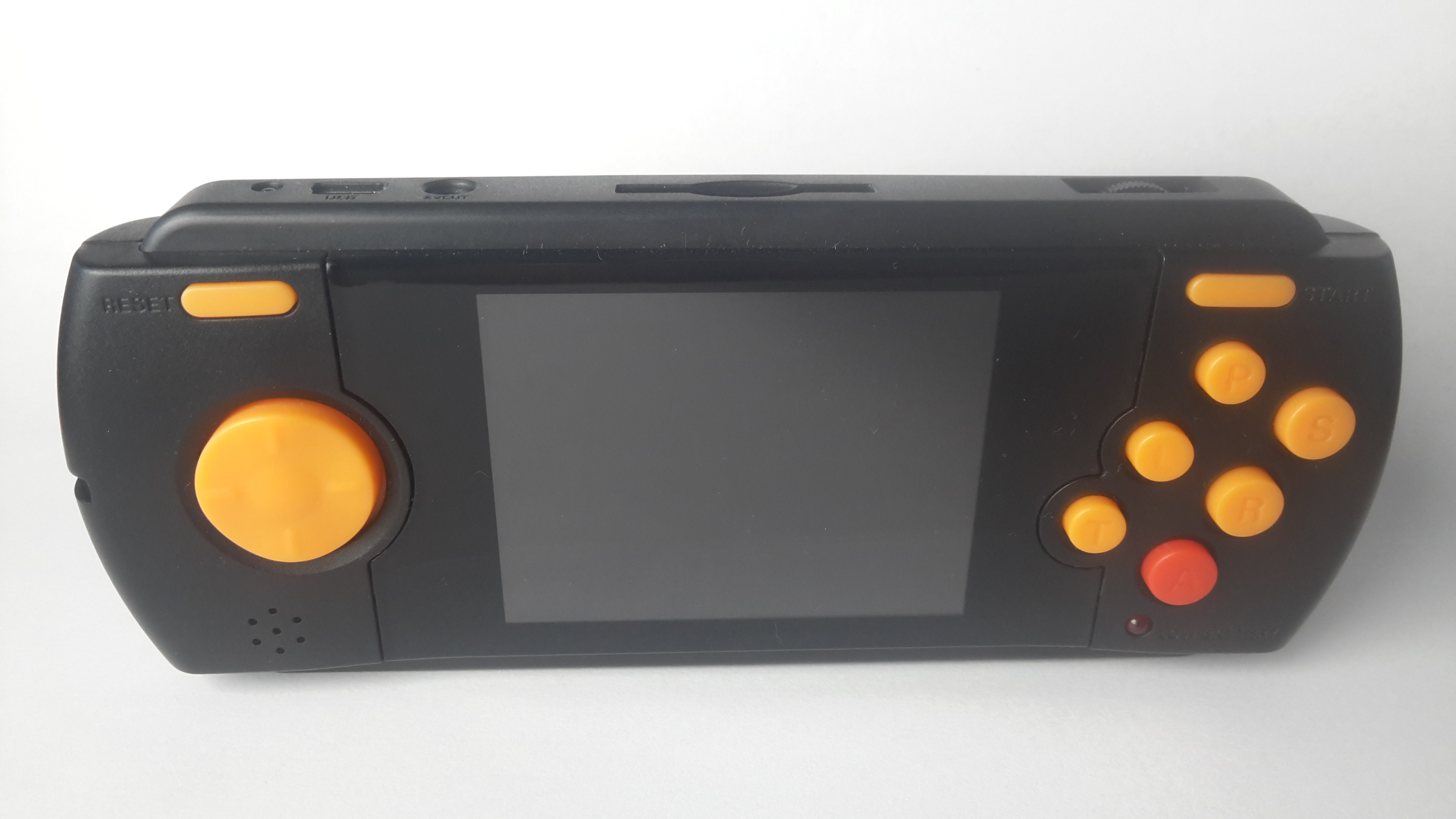
Atari Flashback Portable (2016)

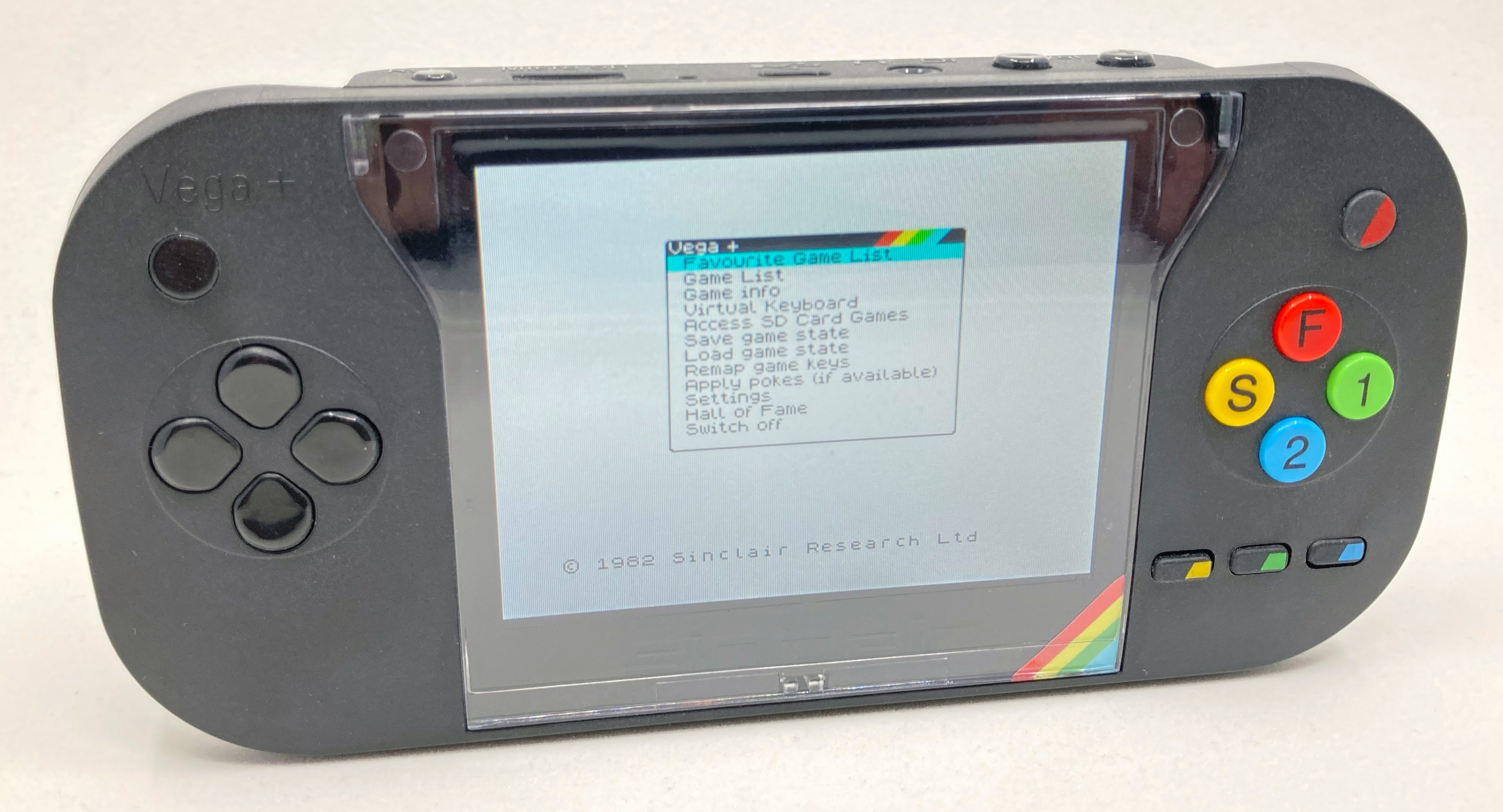
ZX Spectrum Vega+ (2018)

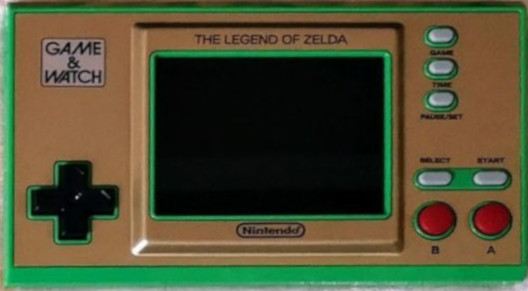
Game & Watch: The Legend of Zelda (2021)
Background shading indicates dedicated consoles.

Name	Release date	Manufacturer
Mattel Handheld Games re-release series	2001-2003	Mattel
Game & Watch Ball Club Nintendo re-release	2009	Nintendo
SupaBoy Portable Pocket Console	2011	Hyperkin
Retro Duo Portable	2012	Retro-Bit
Neo Geo X (can be connected to TV)	2012	Tommo
Atari Flashback Portable	2016	AtGames
Sega Genesis Ultimate Portable Game Player	2016	AtGames
Atari Flashback Portable 2.0	2017	AtGames
Atari Flashback Portable 3.0	2018	AtGames
Go Retro! Portable	2018	Retro-Bit
The Oregon Trail Handheld	2018	Basic Fun
ZX Spectrum Vega+	2018	Retro Computers Ltd
Atari Flashback Portable 4.0	2019	AtGames
Evercade	2020	Blaze Entertainment
Game Gear Micro	2020	Sega
Game & Watch: Super Mario Bros.	2020	Nintendo
Game & Watch: The Legend of Zelda	2021	Nintendo
Atari 2600 Tiny Arcade	2021	Super Impulse
Analogue Pocket	2021	Analogue
Evercade EXP	2022	Blaze Entertainment
Super Pocket Taito Edition	2023	HyperMegaTech!
Super Pocket Capcom Edition	2023	HyperMegaTech!
Atari Micro Player	2023	My Arcade / Atari
Atari Pocket Player	2023	My Arcade / Atari
Chromatic	2024	ModRetro
Super Pocket Atari Edition	2024	HyperMegaTech!
Super Pocket Technōs Edition	2024	HyperMegaTech!
Super Pocket Neo Geo Edition	2025	HyperMegaTech!
Super Pocket Data East Edition	2025	HyperMegaTech!
Atari Gamestation Go	2025	My Arcade / Atari
Super Pocket Rare Edition	2026	HyperMegaTech!
Super Pocket Activision Edition	2026	HyperMegaTech!
Evercade Nexus	2026	Blaze Entertainment

== See also ==
- List of video game console emulators
- List of dedicated video game consoles
