= Plug-&-Play TV Games =

Series of dedicated video game devices

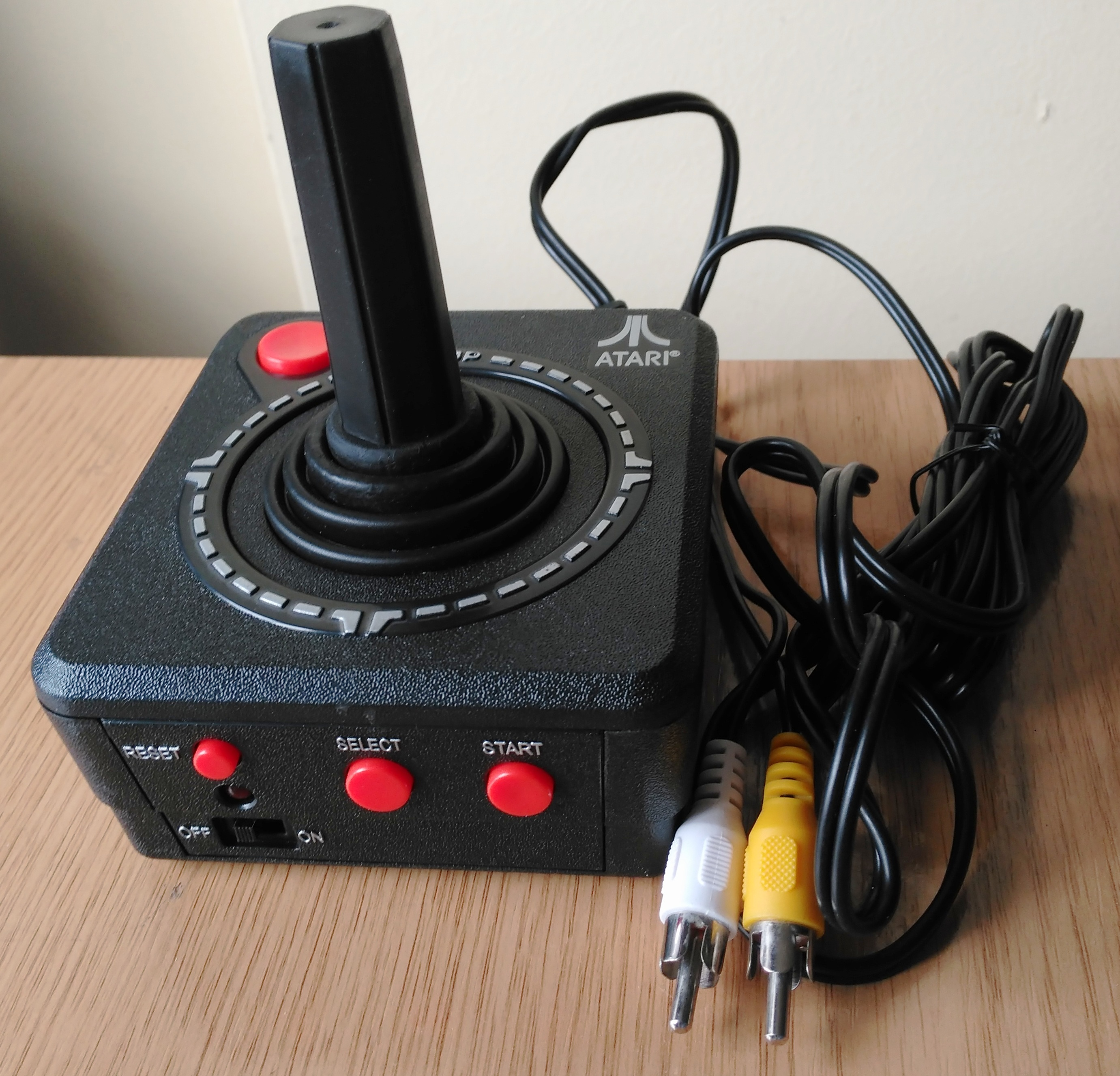
Atari Classics 10-in-1 TV Game

Plug-&-Play TV Games is a series of plug-n-play game devices produced by Jakks Pacific.

When connected to a television set via RCA connector cables, the user is able to play a pre-defined selection of video games. Some models are collections of ports of games by companies such as Atari and Namco, while others are collections of original games. Some versions facilitate the addition of games, via proprietary GameKey expansion cards, and/or include wireless features.

== List of games ==
- 1 vs 100
- Activision
- Are You Smarter Than A 5th Grader?
- Atari series
  - Atari Joystick Controller TV Video Game System
  - Atari Paddle Controller TV Game System
- Avatar: The Last Airbender
- Bass Angler Championship
- The Batman
- Bejeweled Deluxe
- Big Buck Hunter Pro
- Big Buck Safari
- Blue's Room
- Capcom
- Cars 2
- Deal or No Deal
- Disney series
- Disney Princess
- Dora the Explorer series
- Dragon Ball Z
- DreamWorks Animation
- EA Sports Madden, NHL 95 & FIFA '96
- Elmo's World
- Fantastic Four
- Frogger
- Go, Diego, Go!
- Hannah Montana
- High School Musical
- Jeopardy!
- "Littlest Pet Shop"
- Max Force
- Mortal Kombat
- ¡Mucha Lucha!
- My Little Pony
- Pac-Man and Ms. Pac-Man series (Namco series)
- PAW Patrol series
- Nicktoons series
- Pixar
- Power Rangers series
- The Price Is Right
- Phineas and Ferb
- Retro Arcade featuring Space Invaders
- Scooby-Doo
- Sesame Street
- Shrek
- Spider-Man series (Notable games include: The Amazing Spider-Man and the Masked Menace, Spider-Man's Villain Roundup, more)
- SpongeBob SquarePants series (Notable games include: The Fry-Cook Games, Jellyfish Dodge, more)
- Star Wars series
- Superman
- Super Silly Makeover
- Tele-Doodle
- Thomas & Friends series (Games include: Right on Time and Learning Circus Express)
- Triple Header Sports
- Toy Story series
- Ultimotion series (Unlicensed Wii Clones)
- The Walking Dead Zombie Hunter
- Wall-E
- Winnie the Pooh
- Winx Club
- Wheel of Fortune series
- WWE
