= Atari Joystick Controller TV Video Game System =

2003 plug and play video gaming system

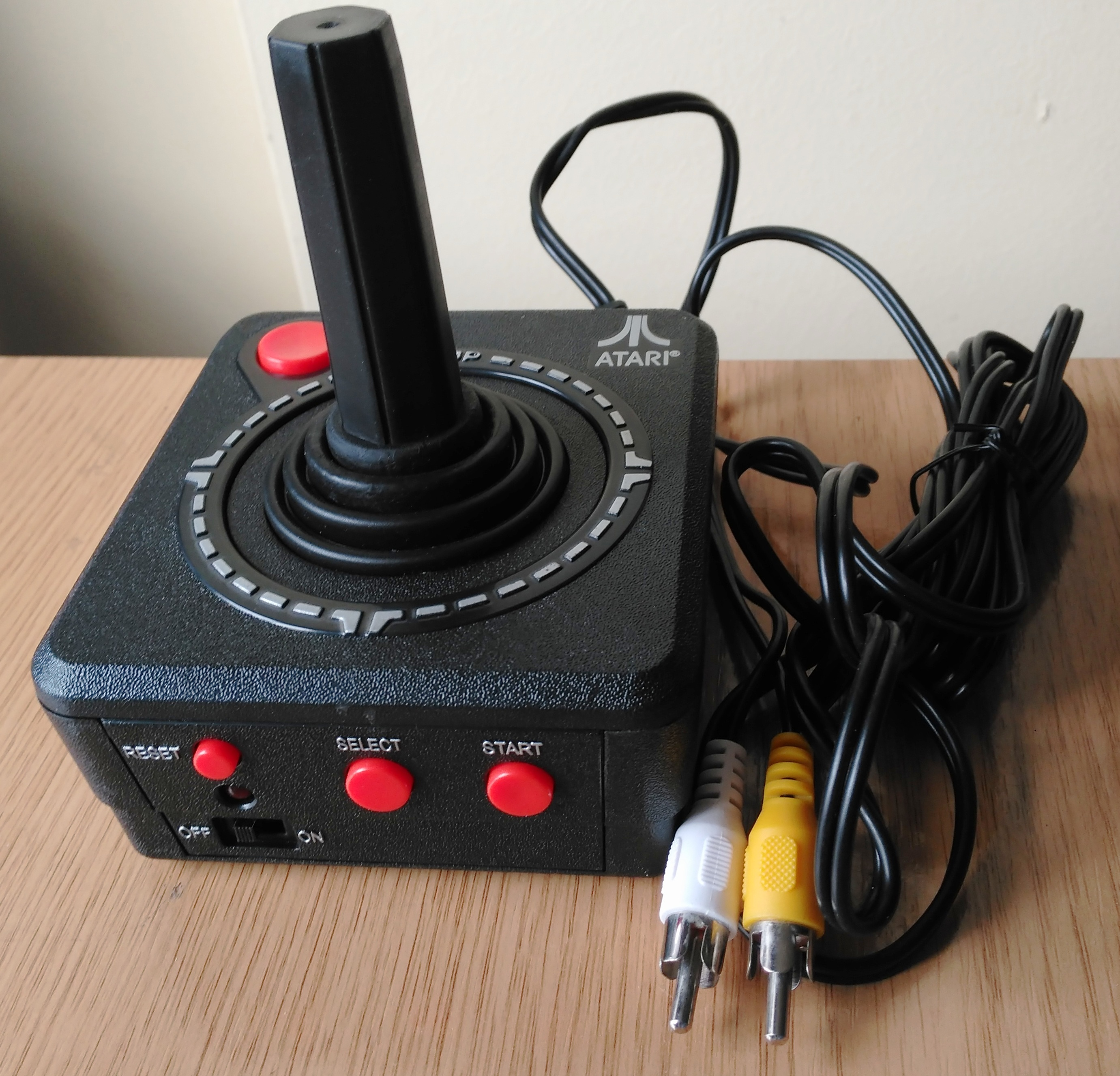
An Atari 10-in-1 Joystick Controller game

The Atari Joystick Controller TV Video Game System is a 2003 entry of Jakks Pacific's Plug It In & Play TV Games lineup. The device itself is designed to look like the CX40 joystick used on the Atari 2600 and has an Atari licence. It was sold in Europe by Revell GmbH.

== Games list ==
- Adventure
- Asteroids
- Breakout
- Centipede
- Circus Atari
- Gravitar
- Missile Command
- Pong
- Volleyball
- Yars' Revenge

== Basic Fun version ==
In 2017, Basic Fun released a version of this joystick called Atari 2600 Plug & Play Joystick with the game list otherwise being the same except with Canyon Bomber, Crystal Castles, Millipede, and Warlords replacing Circus Atari, Pong, Gravitar, and Yars' Revenge.

== See also ==
- Handheld TV game
- Atari Flashback
