= Polymega =

Home video game console

- Also known as: RetroBlox
- Developer: Playmaji, Inc
- Type: Retro style video game console; Home video game console
- Released: September 12, 2021
- Introductory price: $450
- Operating system: Linux-based
- CPU: Intel Coffee Lake S
- Connectivity: Wi-Fi, Ethernet
- Backward compatibility: NES; SNES; TurboGrafx-CD; Sega Genesis; Sega CD; Sega 32X; Sega Saturn; Neo Geo CD; PlayStation; Nintendo 64
- Website: polymega.com

The Polymega is a home video game console developed by American company Playmaji, Inc. It is a retro gaming console offering backwards compatibility with several CD-based and cartridge-based platforms: PlayStation, TurboGrafx-CD, Neo Geo CD, Sega CD, Sega Saturn, Nintendo Entertainment System (NES), Sega Genesis, Sega 32X, Super Nintendo Entertainment System (SNES), and Nintendo 64. It includes a built-in DVD drive, while separate add-ons known as Element Modules provide support for cartridge-based games.

It was announced as the RetroBlox in 2017 and faced numerous delays before being released in September 2021.

== History ==
The console was announced in January 2017 as the RetroBlox. It would be produced by RetroBlox, Inc, a Los Angeles-based company founded by Bryan Bernal and Eric Christensen, both former employees at Insomniac Games. Bernal was inspired to create the console after taking a trip to Japan in 2015. There, he purchased numerous PC Engine games, but was disappointed in the number of console modifications needed to make them run on a modern HD television. He sought to create a modernized console capable of playing such games without the need for modifications. The console was initially set to release in early 2018, although it faced several delays.

In May 2017, the console was renamed Polymega, while RetroBlox, Inc would become Playmaji, Inc. Development on the console continued quietly over the next year, before it was shown at E3 2018. Playmaji started taking pre-orders in September 2018, but the console's official website went off-line for several days following high traffic and a DDoS attack.

The hardware design phase was finished in early 2019, although the console's release was expected to be impacted by a supply shortage of 14nm chips. A public beta test phase began in early 2020, and the console's full release would be further delayed to November 2020, due to third-party production issues; an overseas partner, responsible for manufacturing printed circuit boards used in the console, closed in mid-2020. The release was delayed again after communication issues arose with Wal-Mart following a personnel change. As a result, Playmaji canceled pre-orders made through Wal-Mart's website and urged buyers to purchase the console through the Polymega website instead, with the release delayed to February 2021 for those who preordered in 2018 and 2019.

The consoles were assembled in Myanmar, where protests took place during 2021, causing another delay in the Polymega's release. The COVID-19 pandemic was also a factor for the delay. The console was eventually released worldwide on September 12, 2021, fulfilling pre-orders made prior to May 2020. Some units arrived in Japan a day early. The console retails for $450, while Element Modules – plug-ins which support cartridge games – retail for $80.

In February 2023, Playmaji announced plans to eventually launch the Polymega App, a free application allowing users to play their saved games on a personal computer. The company also plans to launch a paid subscription service known as Polymega XL, offering additional features for the Polymega App such as cheat codes and cloud access to game libraries. Because modern computers often lack a disc drive, Playmaji intends to release the Polymega Remix, an external disc drive powered by USB that also offers cartridge support.

In July 2023, Playmaji announced a partnership with Atari, which became a minority investor. The deal would help Playmaji with its backlog of Polymega pre-orders; those dating to 2021 were expected to be shipped by the end of 2023. Also under the partnership, the Polymega App and Remix will be compatible with the modern Atari VCS console.

== Hardware ==
The Polymega runs on an Intel Coffee Lake S processor. It has Wi-Fi and Ethernet capability, and uses HDMI with an output of 1080p.

The console's default controller resembles a DualShock 4, and is compatible with all modules. It can be used wirelessly or plugged into the console via microUSB. Playmaji also produces a lineup of classic controllers for each module, featuring a design similar to their original counterparts. Controllers produced for the original consoles are compatible with the Polymega's modules. Likewise, each module's classic controllers can be used with the original consoles. Third-party USB controllers can also be used on the Polymega, including the Xbox 360 controller.

Playmaji worked with Sinden Technology to create a Polymega light gun, the Retro Gun Controller, which is designed to work with HD televisions. It was released in 2025.

== Games ==
The Polymega utilizes Linux, and is emulation-based, using legally licensed software such as Kega Fusion, MAME, Mednafen, and Mesen, all modified by Playmaji. A CD drive is built into the main game console, while cartridge-based games are supported through add-ons known as Element Modules, which plug into the base unit. Each module includes five pre-installed games.

Playmaji has touted the Polymega as "the world's most compatible game console". It supports games released for several cartridge-based consoles: Nintendo Entertainment System (NES), Super Nintendo Entertainment System (SNES), and Sega Genesis. Supported CD-based consoles include PlayStation, Sega CD, and TurboGrafx-16 and its international variants such as the PC Engine.

Support for the Neo Geo CD was announced in June 2017. The Polymega loads Neo Geo CD games at a significantly faster rate compared to the original console, which was known for its sluggish load times. In September 2018, support was announced for the Sega Saturn, a difficult console to emulate. Bernal considered the Dreamcast as a likely cutoff point, saying in 2018 that Playmaji does not intend to support GameCube, PlayStation 2, Xbox, or any newer consoles. Bernal noted challenges in emulating the Dreamcast due to its obscure GD-ROM format, but said in 2022, "We're working on that. We have been vetting it basically since day one."

The Polymega was initially intended to use a field-programmable gate array (FPGA), but this was scrapped in mid-2018. The removal of FPGA provided more internal space for a higher clock-speed dual core chip, allowing for compatibility with more-demanding consoles such as Saturn, Dreamcast, and Nintendo 64. Prior to that point, Bernal said that some consoles, particularly the N64, would not be supported for the time being due to legal challenges, including patents which had yet to expire. In late 2021, Playmaji announced that it would release an N64 module due to popular demand. Bernal said, "There are virtually no other options out there for playing the N64 library legally, outside of the original hardware -- so it's an obvious choice for us". The N64 module was released in December 2023. Compatibility for Game Boy and Game Boy Color games is planned with the use of the N64's Transfer Pak. As part of the Atari partnership, Playmaji also plans to produce a module to support Atari 2600 and 7800 cartridges, expected for release during 2024.

The Polymega offers compatibility with more than 90 percent of each classic console's game library. It is compatible with regional console variants, playing NTSC, PAL, and Japanese games without patches. The console includes a built-in database of cover art, descriptions, and screenshots for thousands of games. This information is displayed whenever a game is inserted into the console, and is sorted by console and region.

The Polymega can save the contents of any inserted game to its memory, providing a back-up copy and allowing for preservation of physical copies. Game files acquired through Internet downloads cannot be saved to the Polymega, which requires a copy of the original game to do so. A module is no longer required to play a game once its data has been saved to the console. However, it is still required if using the intended classic controllers. The console contains 32 GB, and includes slots for SD cards and M.2 SSD, providing additional storage for archived games.

Initially, the Polymega was to include a video game live streaming option through YouTube and Twitch, but this feature was removed in 2018.

Playmaji releases periodic system updates for the console, for instance to offer support for previously incompatible games. An update in late 2021 introduced screen filters that can be applied to any game, simulating the monochromatic displays of the Game Boy and Virtual Boy.

Playmaji intends to launch a digital store, allowing games to be downloaded to the console, including arcade games. An internal development and publishing studio was also established for the creation of original games exclusive to the Polymega. Playmaji plans to eventually offer support for cloud gaming services as well.

== Reception ==
Christopher Grant of Polygon considered the console worthwhile for gamers who already own a large collection, writing, "The Polymega is an enticing all-in-one solution and while it may not have the FPGA-based bona fides of the MiSTer, it stands on its own as a viable contender for the ultimate retro gaming console crown". Will Greenwald of PCMag praised the Polymega's emulation software and rated the console 4 out of 5. Damien McFerran of Nintendo Life offered particular praise for the Saturn emulation, and wrote that "there's nothing else quite like this machine on the market – and It looks set to become a highly desirable piece of hardware for retro fans". Critics negatively noted the high retail price. PCMag and Wired included the Polymega on their list of the best retro gaming consoles.
