= Max Force =

Toy weapon

- Type: Toy gun
- Company: Jakks Pacific
- Country: United States
- Availability: 2011–2014
- Materials: Plastic (guns); Paper and wood (pellets)
- Slogan: "Graduate from foam."

Max Force was a line of toy weapons made by Jakks Pacific to compete with Hasbro's Nerf Blasters. Instead of foam darts, Max Force guns fired "Soft Splat Pellets", which are made of a mixture of paper and wood. These pellets were dipped into water before being loaded into the guns and fired at distances up to 100 feet. The Soft Splat Pellets disintegrated upon impact without causing any bodily harm.

The Max Force Terrornator 85 was demonstrated in the July 13, 2011 episode of Late Show with David Letterman, wherein David Letterman mentioned that "you can save US$40 and get a straw and napkin."

As of 2014, the Max Force line has been discontinued.
