= GameKey =

Expansion modules for plug-and-play TV consoles

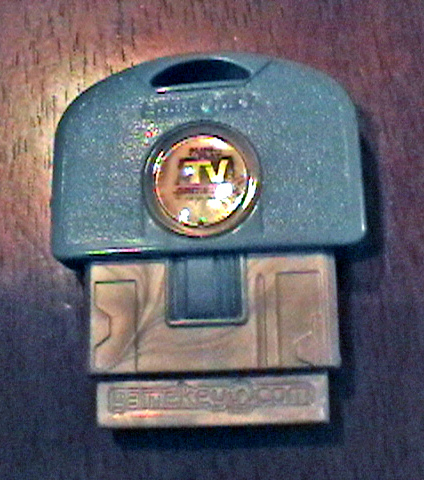
- GameKey for the Nicktoons plug and play game
- Manufacturer: Jakks Pacific
- Type: Video game accessory
- Generation: Sixth generation era
- Lifespan: July 2005
- Discontinued: 2006
- Media: ROM cartridge
- Controller input: GameKey-ready TV Game controller
- Best-selling game: Namco Ms. Pac-Man GameKeys

GameKeys are expansion modules made by Jakks Pacific for the purpose of adding games to GameKey-ready entries in their Plug It In & Play TV Games product line.

== History ==
The GameKey was first announced at the 2005 International Toy Fair, and the first products were released in July 2005.

GameKeys were mainly marketed for the Namco Ms. Pac-Man controller, but different GameKeys existed for other TV Games manufactured by Jakks Pacific, including Nicktoons, Star Wars, and Disney. There were also GameKeys that never saw release due to market failure, such as Fantastic Four and Capcom.

GameKeys were discontinued in late 2006 after struggling for a year.

== List of GameKey-Ready Controllers ==
- Namco Ms. Pac-Man
- Star Wars (wireless version also)
- Nicktoons
- Disney
- Disney Princess
- Spider-Man
- Fantastic Four
- Dragon Ball Z
- Justice League
- SpongeBob SquarePants: The Fry Cook Games
- Dora the Explorer
- Capcom
- Scooby-Doo
- Care Bears
- Wheel of Fortune
- WWE
