= Retro Duo =

Handheld game console

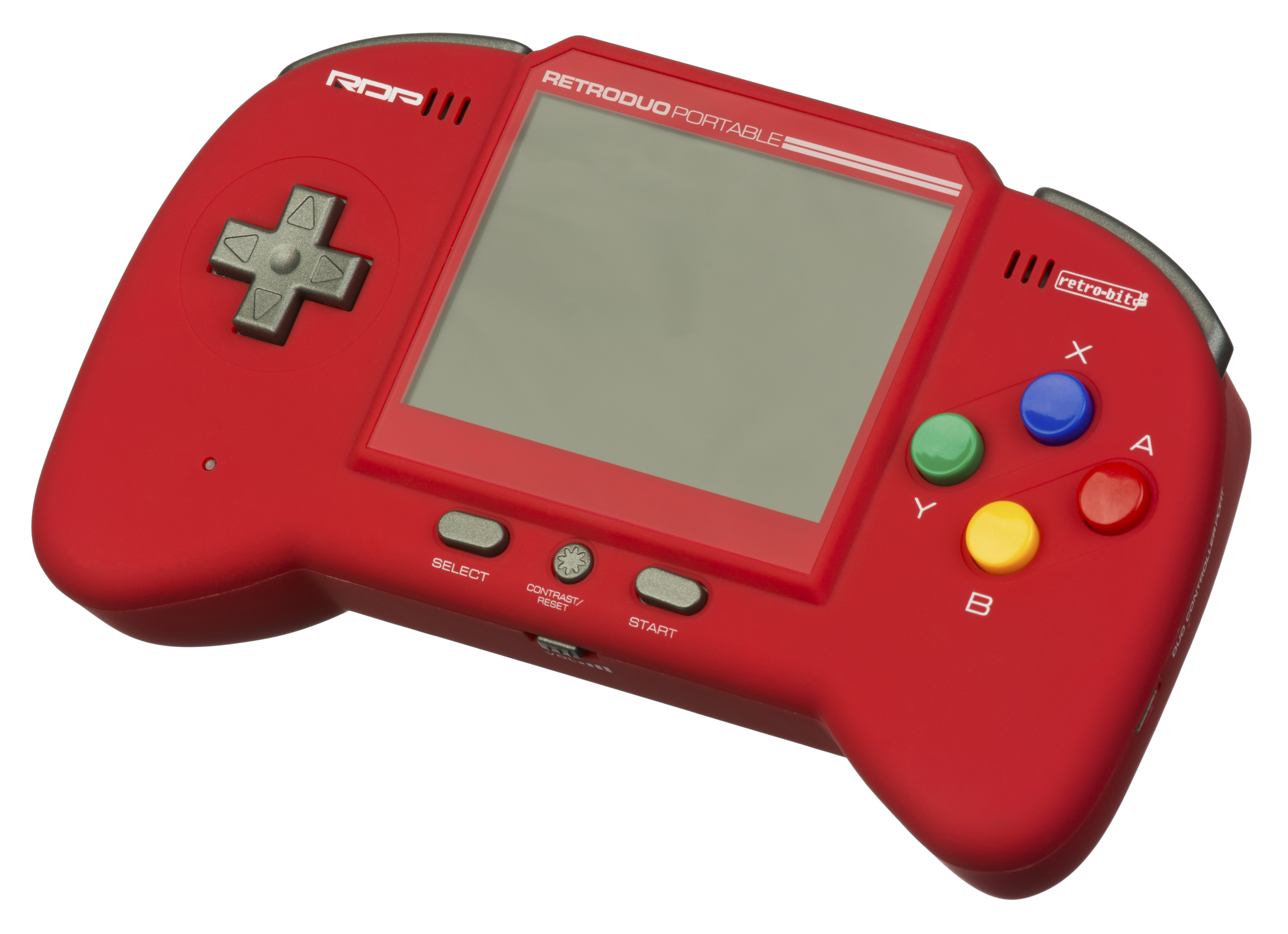
- The Retro Duo Portable
- Manufacturer: Retro-Bit
- Type: Handheld game console
- Generation: Seventh generation (emulates third and fourth)
- Lifespan: NA: 2008
- Media: NES/SNES/SFami ROM Cartridge
- CPU: 8-bit & 16-bit
- Controller input: 2 SNES controller ports
- Backward compatibility: NES, Super NES/Super Famicom
- Successor: Super Retro Trio

The Retro Duo is a game console developed by Retro-Bit and distributed by Innex, Inc. It plays game cartridges for the Nintendo Entertainment System and Super Nintendo Entertainment System. It plays North American, European and Japanese games. S-video is compatible when playing SNES games. The console is not licensed by Nintendo and it's not fully compatible with every game released for the two game systems, but the majority of games function properly. While it has only been released in Canada and the United States, it can still be used in Europe and Japan with a power plug adapter. The console is compatible with official and third party SNES controllers.

Reviews of the Retro Duo have praised its compatibility for games many other clone consoles struggle with (due to hardware issues) such as Castlevania III: Dracula's Curse on the NES, Star Fox on the SNES, and the Game Genie cheat cartridge. The Retro Duo is also compatible with the Super Game Boy device. The Retro Duo was released in four different color schemes: white/blue, silver/black, black/red, and a red/gold limited-edition version. The 3.0 release fixed many issues with the previous 2 versions, including the compatibility with Castlevania III, and came as a red/blue Mascot edition.

== Compatibility ==
List of known incompatible games:

=== Nintendo Entertainment System ===
- 720° (NTSC)
- Battletoads (NTSC) (game hangs after level 2, though a cheat allows the player to jump to level 3)
- Digger T. Rock: Legend of the Lost City (PAL) (plays title screen, in-game crashes with graphics glitch, rendering it unplayable)
- Duck Hunt (NES Zapper cannot be plugged in; works with NES to SNES adapting cables that have accessory support, but the NES Zapper only works with a CRT TV set)
- Maniac Mansion
- Paperboy (NTSC) (controller is not recognized but there is a hacked version that works; it's usually listed on pirate multicarts (400 in 1 or 500 in 1))
- Rolling Thunder (works with Retro Duo 2.0 and above)

=== Super Nintendo Entertainment System ===
Most or all the PAL games listed below are not playable on a real NTSC Super NES (even with its security chip disabled). Their inclusion here does not reflect incompatibilities between the (NTSC) Retro Duo and a real NTSC Super NES.

- ActRaiser 2 (NTSC)
- Batman Returns (PAL)
- Donald in Maui Mallard (PAL)
- Donkey Kong Country (PAL)
- Donkey Kong Country 2: Diddy's Kong Quest (PAL)
- Donkey Kong Country 3: Dixie Kong's Double Trouble! (PAL)
- EarthBound (NTSC) (minor incompatibility; antipiracy check will activate, and will cause increased enemy spawn rate; highly playable)
- GP-1: Part II (PAL)
- Illusion of Time (PAL)
- Kirby's Fun Pak (PAL)
- Lethal Enforcers (PAL)
- Out of This World (NTSC) (screen border flashes, sprites either load distorted or not at all)
- Plok (PAL)
- Pilotwings (PAL) (minor incompatibility; moving target platforms blink and sometimes produce a mirroring effect; minor screen flashes and haze; highly playable)
- Secret of Mana (PAL)
- Starwing (PAL)
- Stunt Race FX (PAL)
- Super Ghouls 'n Ghosts (PAL and NTSC) (Stage 3-2 boss is invisible and Stage 4 is completely black except for enemies, player and a few certain platforms - unplayable)
- Super Mario All-Stars (PAL)
- Super Mario All-Stars + Super Mario World (PAL)
- Super Mario Kart (PAL) (plays, but graphics are extremely glitchy)
- Super Mario RPG: Legend of the Seven Stars (software revisions 1.2 and 1.3)
- Super Metroid (PAL)
- Terranigma (PAL) (trips the antipiracy check, like every other clone to date)
- Zombies (PAL)

Controllers / Accessories (compatible with NES to SNES cables but only ones with accessory support)

- R.O.B.
- NES Zapper
- Power Pad
- NES Advantage
- NES Max
- Power Glove

== Retro Duo Portable ==
Retro-Bit also has a portable version of the console. The Retro Duo Portable, was released with a black case on 23 January 2012, and later with a red case on 25 September. The Retro Duo Portable is capable of playing Super NES cartridges via a large cartridge slot in the back. The Retro Duo Portable also supports NES, Genesis, and Game Boy games with an appropriate cartridge adapter for each system.

== See also ==
- Generation NEX
