= RetroN =

Video game console family

RetroN is a series of video game consoles created and developed by Hyperkin which allows users to play video games from consoles such as the Nintendo Entertainment System and the Super NES. Since the release of the RetroN 5, they have been connected via HDMI. The latest in the series, RetroN Sq, was released in 2021.

== Released ==
Note: The numbering in early RetroN models refers to the number of cartridge slots the system has, and not necessarily the order of release.

=== RetroN 3 (2010) ===
The RetroN 3 was released in May 2010. It supports Nintendo Entertainment System (NES), Super NES (SNES) and Genesis games. It includes wireless controllers, as well as ports allowing for use of the original controllers released for each console. The RetroN 3 offers S-video or composite AV output. It retailed for $70, and came in two colors: red and black.

RetroN 3 HD, an updated version with HDMI output, was released on February 21, 2020.

=== RetroN 1 (2011) ===
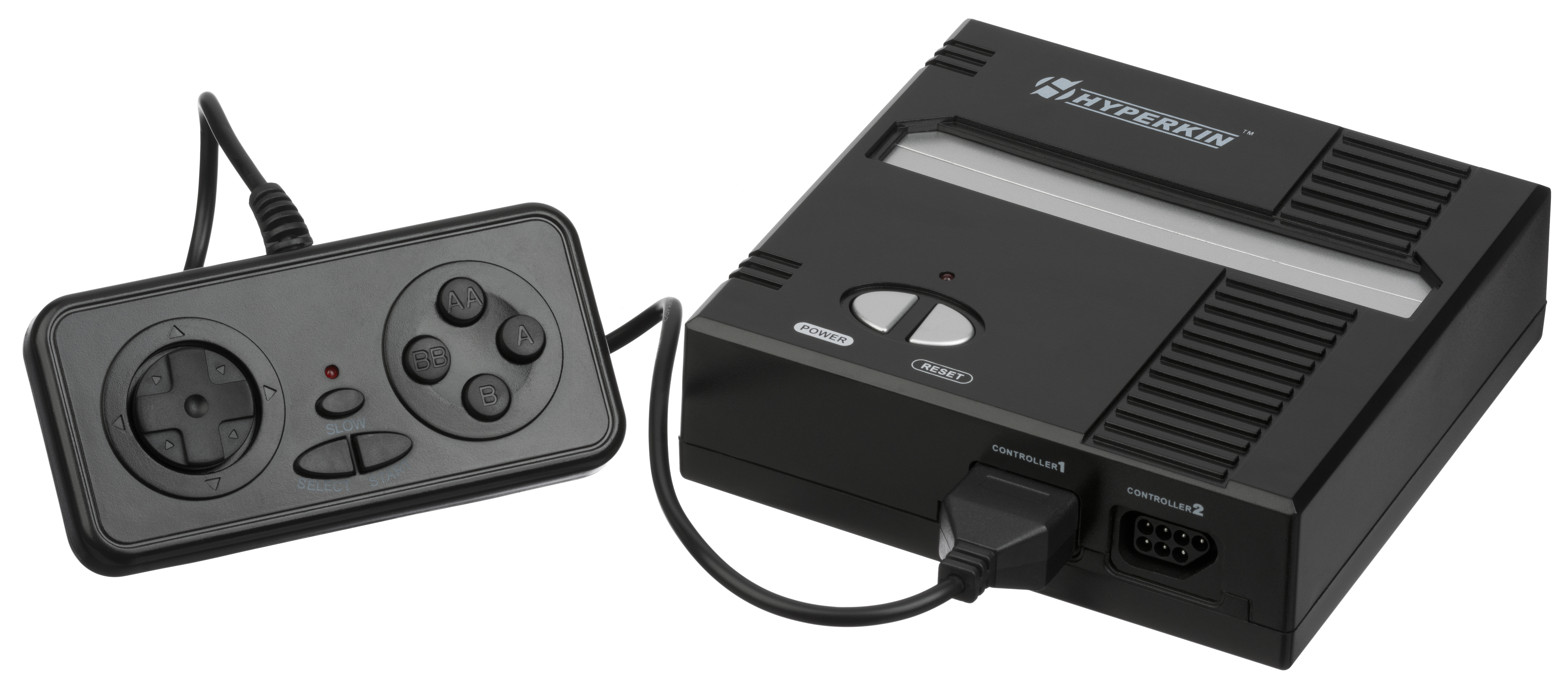
A RetroN 1, meant for playing NES games

The RetroN 1 was released in January 2011, and only plays NES games.

A re-release, known as both the RetroN 1 HD and RetroN HD, came out in 2017. It has HDMI output and a controller that more closely resembles that of the NES. IGN believed that Hyperkin released the RetroN HD in response to Nintendo's discontinuation of the NES Classic Edition. The console received a mostly positive review from GameSpot.

RetroN 1 AV, an updated version with only composite video outputs, was released in early 2021.

=== RetroN 2 (2012) ===
The RetroN 2 was released in 2012, and plays NES and SNES games. The RetroN 2 HD was shown at TooManyGames 2019, and released soon after. It is an updated version with HDMI out.

=== RetroN 5 (2014) ===
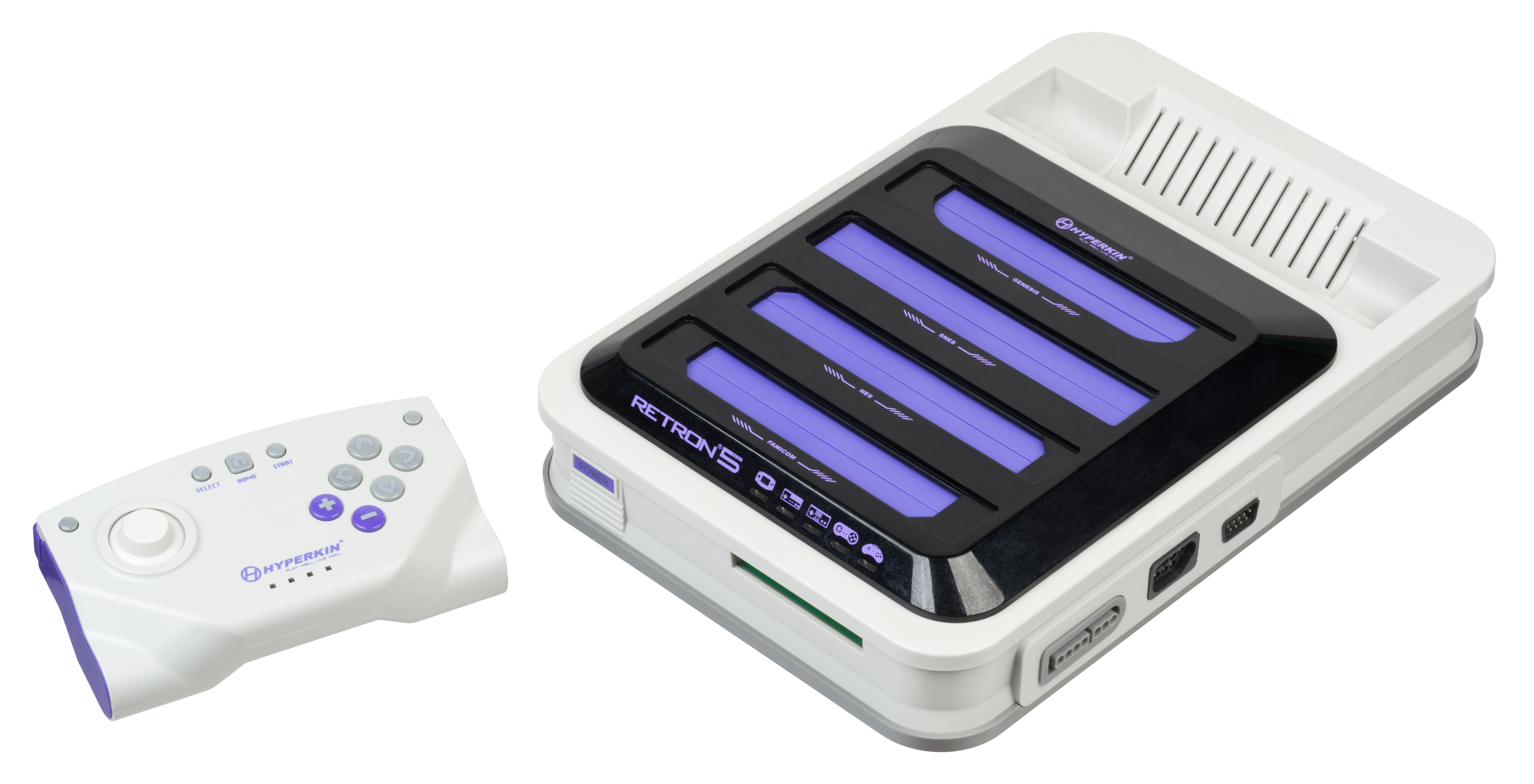
The RetroN 5, a system that plays various game systems through software emulation

Originally planned as the RetroN 4, with four cartridge slots supporting NES, SNES, Genesis, and Game Boy/Game Boy Color/Game Boy Advance games. It was officially unveiled in March 2013 as the RetroN 5, with a fifth slot added for Famicom cartridges. The RetroN 5 was released in 2014.

The RetroN 5 received a mixed reception from critics. Huffington Post writer Michael Rundle gave the console a 4.5 out of 5 but wished it looked better and had the ability to play more consoles, such as the BBC Micro, Amiga, and Atari platforms. Brian Easton of BoingBoing said the quality is good although it "requires more force to remove [the cartridges] than feels comfortable".

The developers behind the RetroArch project claimed "the RetroN 5 violates several licenses". This was because the console used the Genesis Plus GX and SNES9x Next emulators to launch some games. Both of the emulators are filed under a non-commercial license, thus meaning they cannot be used in commercial products, such as the RetroN 5.

Retron 5 creators then responded to this with giving their side of the story. Hyperkin released the first RetroN 5 special edition called Hyper Beach a few years later.

=== RetroN 77 (2017) ===
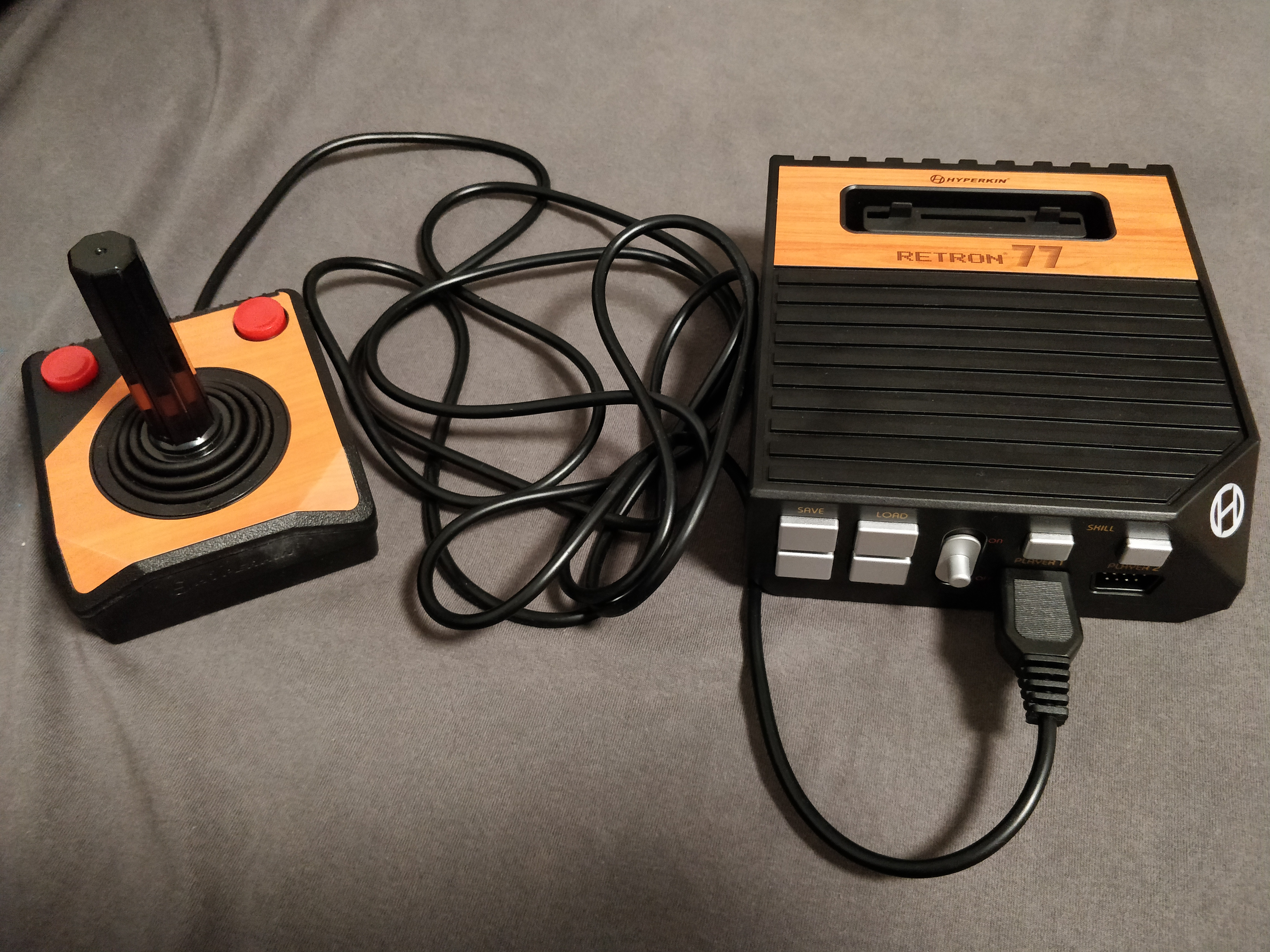
A RetroN 77 with controller

In 2017, Hyperkin announced the RetroN 77, a clone of the Atari 2600 video game console utilizing software emulation. Unlike recent clones in the Atari Flashback series, the RetroN 77 plays original cartridges as opposed to containing pre-installed games. The console was expected to launch during the 2017 holiday season. The RetroN 77 comes with four pack in homebrew games; Astronomer, Baby, Muncher 77 and Nexion 3D.

=== Supa RetroN HD (2018) ===
Following Nintendo's announcement of the Super NES Classic Edition, Hyperkin announced they were developing the Supa RetroN HD, a high-definition clone of the original SNES. It was released on January 8, 2018. Keeping in line with their previous RetroN consoles, the Supa RetroN HD supports original SNES cartridges rather than featuring built-in games.

=== Mega RetroN HD (2018) ===
A Sega Genesis clone console announced in January 2018, and released that October.

=== RetroN Sq (2021) ===
Announced in January 2020 as the RetroN Jr., it was renamed the RetroN Sq in December 2020, and launched on March 25, 2021. This console is designed to play Game Boy, Game Boy Color, and Game Boy Advance games up to 720p on HDMI-compatible televisions through software emulation. Matthew Adler of IGN praised the console, rating it 8 out of 10.

== Upcoming ==
=== RetroN Ult ===
In June 2019, Hyperkin announced plans to release a Nintendo 64 clone system, which was shown at E3 that year. It is undecided if compatibility will be via emulation or hardware.

=== RetroN DIY ===
Announced and shown at CES 2019, it purports to be a Do-it-Yourself kit, with a Raspberry Pi Zero and a custom board which features 2 SNES controller ports with a SNES/Super Famicom cartridge slot.
