= Hyperkin =

American video game company

- Type: Private
- Industry: Video game peripheral manufacturing and distribution
- Founded: 2006
- Headquarters: Los Angeles, California
- Website: Official Website

Hyperkin is an American video game peripheral manufacturer and distributor, founded in 2006, based in Los Angeles, California. They distribute accessories for major gaming consoles, in addition to creating clone consoles that play retro games with modern resolutions and on modern devices, most notably the RetroN series of clone consoles. As with most other NES clones, Hyperkin's NES clones (excluding the Retron5 as it utilizes software emulation) suffer from imperfect sound due to a design flaw in the sound hardware.

In 2011, the company became the exclusive distributor of Dance Battle VS. In addition, they released the Remotext, a Blu-ray remote control and keypad game controller hybrid for the PlayStation 3, and a battery-expanding attachment for the Nintendo 3DS called the Powerplus. They also created the Supaboy, a handheld Super NES. In 2016 Hyperkin released the Supaboy S featuring a bigger 4.3" screen displaying in the 16:9 aspect ratio, making games look stretched. The Supaboy S also introduces an NTSC/PAL switch, improving compatibility with PAL-region games. In 2018, Hyperkin released the Supaboy SFC, which is an upgrade of the Supaboy S with buttons resembling the Super Famicom and PAL Super NES. The Supaboy SFC also has the ability to switch between stretch 16:9 and letterboxed 4:3 aspect ratios by holding down the brightness button.

In 2014, the company released the Retron 5, an Android-based console with five cartridge ports that allowed for play of five different types of retro games. The Retron 5 utilizes code violating the GPL and several non-commercial licenses. As it is an emulator, the Retron5 does not have the sound problems present in Hyperkin's other consoles.

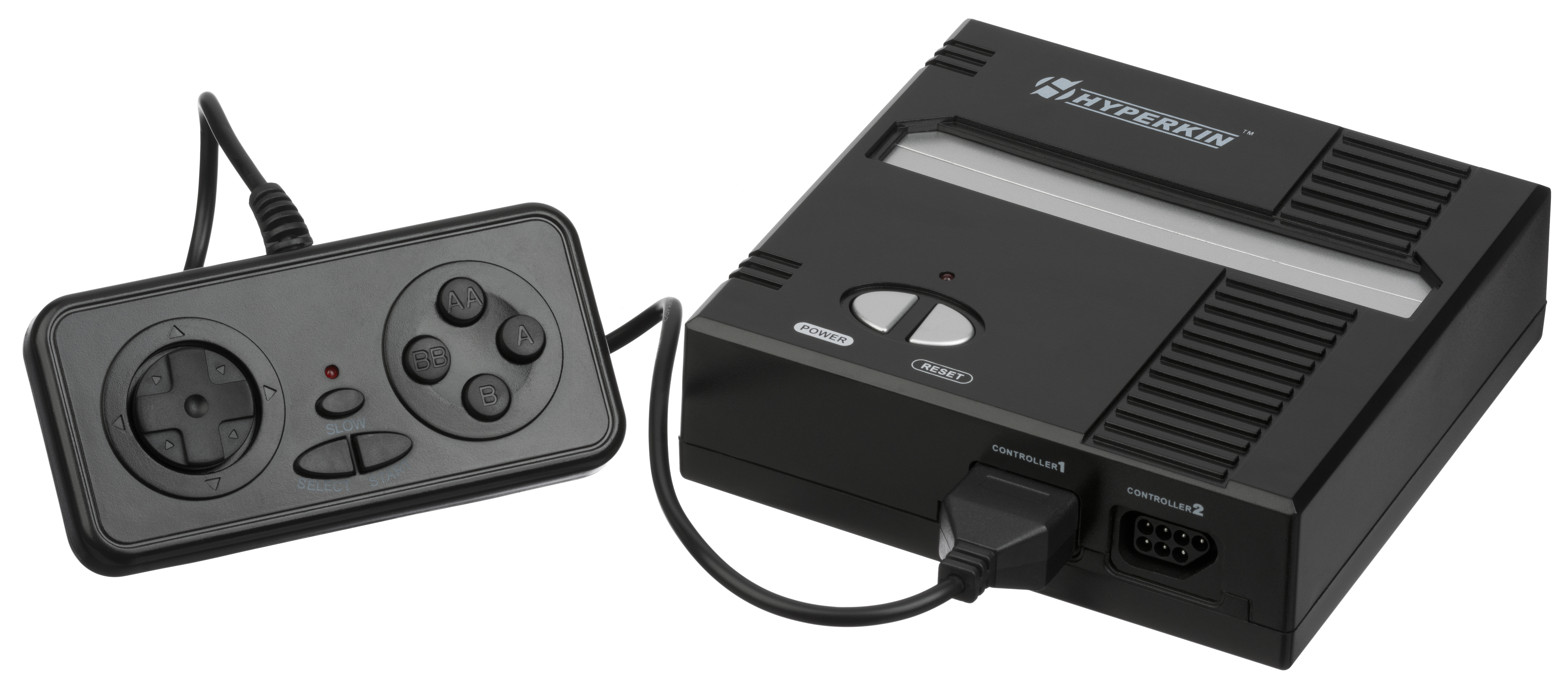
The RetroN 1, one of many Hyperkin consoles.

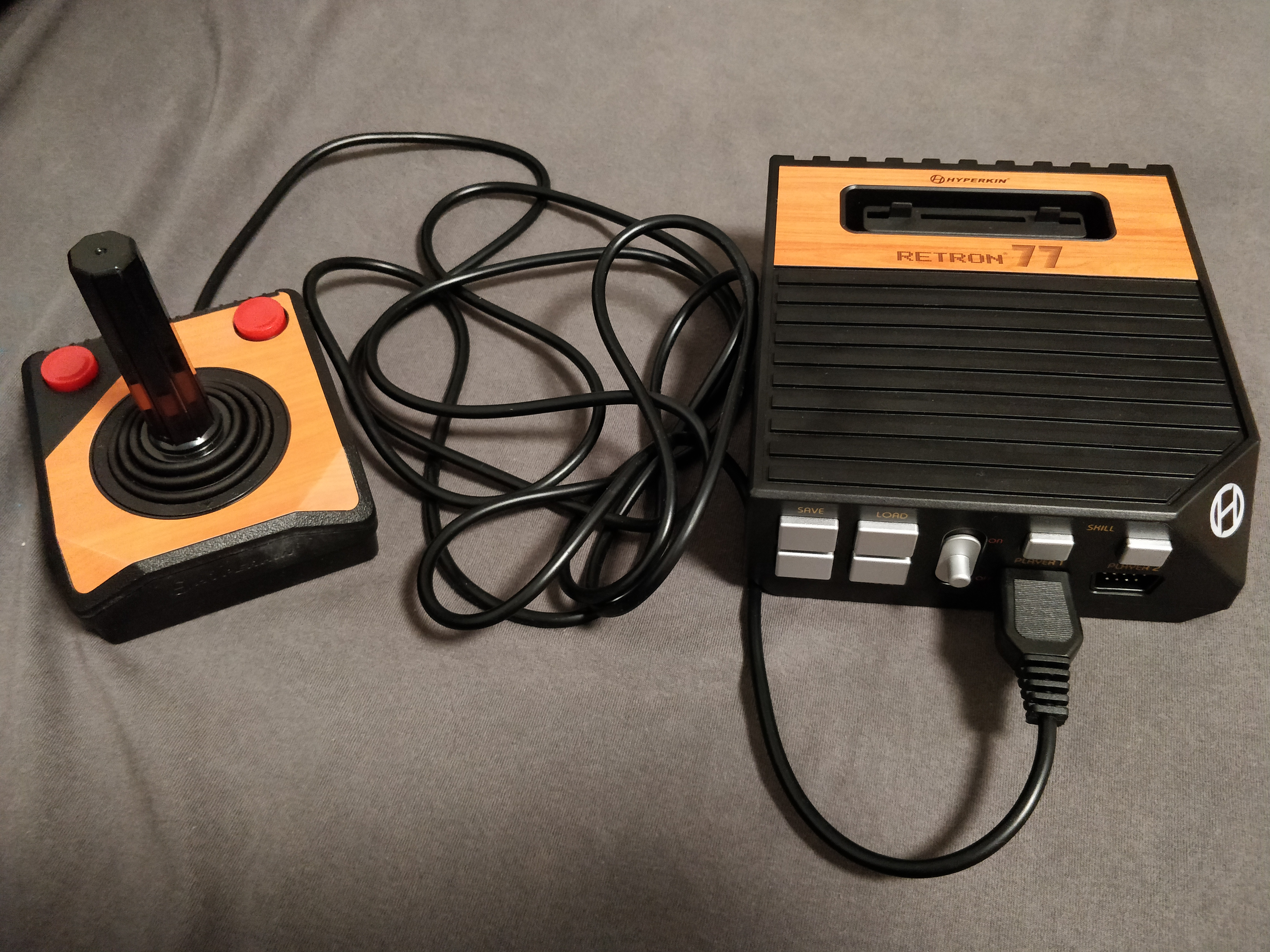
Retron 77

In 2017, the company released the Smart Boy, a smartphone add-on that allows the device to play Game Boy games. The Smart Boy gained an official license by Samsung for use on their phones. They also released the RetroN 77, an emulation-based Atari 2600 clone that can play most, if not all, of the original game cartridges in 1080p.

In 2019, at E3, Hyperkin announced they will make a console that can play Nintendo 64 cartridges in HD, and output to HDMI. The console is expected to be named the Ultra Retron. The release date is not known. It is not officially known yet whether the console uses an FPGA or emulation, however the unit demonstrated at E3 displayed a lightning bolt icon implying the console uses a Raspberry Pi single-board computer instead of an FPGA. Additionally, the demo unit was displaying graphical artifacts only present in a Nintendo 64 emulator.
