= Super Retro Trio =

The Super Retro Trio is a video game console clone manufactured by Retro-Bit. It is able to play NES, Super NES, and Genesis cartridges, and an optional adapter for the console is available which allows it to play Game Boy and Game Boy Advance games.

== Development ==
The console was announced in February 2014 and was released later that year, followed by an improved model in 2018.

== Reception ==
PC World reviewer Will Greenwald praised the console's compatibility both in the range of console games it supports and in its ability to replicate the console hardware, but did note that the console seemed "flimsy" and that it does not support HDMI or scale to higher resolutions.
