= Jakks Pacific =

American toy company

Jakks Pacific, Inc.
- Type: Public
- Traded as: Nasdaq: JAKK; Russell Microcap Index component
- Industry: Consumer products, entertainment
- Founded: January 12, 1995; 31 years ago
- Founder: Jack Friedman; Stephen Berman
- Headquarters: Santa Monica, CA, U.S.
- Key people: Stephen Berman (president and CEO)
- Products: Dolls, action figures, playsets, Handheld TV games
- Brands: Plug-&-Play TV Games
- Revenue: ▼US$571 million (2025)
- Net income: ▼US$9.87 million (2025)
- Website: jakks.com

Jakks Pacific, Inc. is an American toy manufacturer founded in January 1995. The company is best known for producing licensed action figures, playsets, dolls, plush toys, and dress-up sets. They are also well known for their line up of Plug-n-Play Television Game Consoles popularized in the 2000s.

The company was co-founded by Jack Friedman, who had previously founded the toy and video game companies LJN and THQ. Friedman presided over the company, until retiring as CEO and chairman after March 31, 2010, a month before his death on May 3, 2010.

== History ==
Jakks Pacific's logo, 1995–2015

Jack Friedman and Stephen Berman co-founded Jakks Pacific in January 1995. His first master toy license was a seven-year deal with the World Wrestling Federation (WWF) to mainly produce figurines and playsets. In July 1998, the seven-year-deal that would have expired in 2002, was extended to December 2009.

In early 2002, Jakks began working on their own interactive software with creating their own handheld TV games called Plug-&-Play TV Games, where the user plugs the device straight into the television. As of 2002, the original TV Games device from Jakks Pacific sold over 350,000 units. By 2004, the TV Games series had sold 1 million units. As of 2007, Pac-Man TV Games sold over 15 million units.

In December 2002, FUNimation Entertainment awarded Jakks Pacific with the master toy license to produce toys based on the Dragon Ball, Dragon Ball Z and Dragon Ball GT licenses.

In February 2005, Jakks Pacific was instructed to restate the financial statements for fiscal year 2003 to account for the acquisition of Toymax, Trendmasters, and P&M Products.

== Partnerships & acquisitions ==
In 1997, Jakks Pacific purchased the defunct Remco brand from Azrak-Hamway International (AHI).

Child Guidance, and Road Champions in 1997.

In June 1998, Jakks Pacific entered into a joint-license agreement with THQ to release WWF video games, to release their first title in October 1999. Under the deal, publishing would be handled by THQ, and with most of the development being handled by Yuke's. In October 2004, it emerged that the (since renamed) WWE had filed a lawsuit against Jakks Pacific, alleging that both parties had given bribes to the WWF executive Jim Bell and agent Stanley Shenker to hide 'superior' pitches from other publishers, such as Activision. The federal suit was dismissed in December 2007, the state court litigation was dismissed in August 2008 and an appeal was dismissed by the court of appeals in May 2009. In December 2009, WWE announced settlement of the litigation, without any party admitting any wrongdoing. By this point, the WWF's Bell and Shenker had both pleaded guilty to fraud elsewhere in the WWF, involving illegitimate kick-back schemes. The end of 2009 saw the end of the joint-license agreement, THQ signed a new eight-year video game license with WWE, without Jakks Pacific.

Berk, the maker of oversize foam toys, was acquired by Jakks in June 1999. Later that year, in September, Flying Colors was purchased. In November, the purchase of Funnoodle was completed.

Jakks acquired Pentech International in 2000.

Toymax International Inc. and Kidz Biz Ltd. were purchased in 2002.

The company acquired Go Fly A Kite, Color Workshop and Trendmasters in 2003; and Play Along Toys was acquired in 2004.

In 2005, Jakks signed a toy deal with Black+Decker. In December, Jakks purchased Pet Pal Line.

In 2006, the company acquired Creative Designs International.

In 2008, Jakks purchased Kids Only Toys, Tollytots, and Disguise in 2008.

In February 2006, Jakks Pacific announced it had partnerned with Metro-Goldwyn-Mayer (MGM) to make toys and playsets based on the Rocky franchise.

In June 2006, Jakks and Pokémon signed a master toy licensing deal.

In February 2008, it was announced that Jakks Pacific would sign a five-year deal with Total Nonstop Action Wrestling (TNA), to commence in 2010. The existing WWE deal would expire in December 2009.

The company announced in March 2008 that it had signed a deal with Taylor Swift and the Creative Artists Agency (CAA) to produce a licensed series of dolls. In June 2008, Jakks Pacific announced it had signed a four-year deal with Ultimate Fighting Championship (UFC) to produce action figures and licensed toys.

In 2010, the company formed Pacific Animation Partners LLC, a joint venture between that company and Dentsu Entertainment USA, Fremantle, and Topps, to launch the Monsuno property in 2012.

Moose Mountain Toymakers, based in Hong Kong, was purchased by Jakks in October 2011.

In 2012, Jakks Pacific announced the successful negotiation of licenses for The Dark Knight Rises and The Amazing Spider-Man, promoting new toy ranges at the New York and other International Toy Fairs. In July of that year, Ohio-based toy company Maui, Inc. was acquired.

In 2014, the company launched Jakks Meisheng Trading, a joint venture with Meisheng Culture and Creative Corp., to bring its toys to China. In 2016, the two created Studio JP, a joint venture to produce animation.

In September 2015, it was announced that Jakks Pacific had signed a new licensing deal with WWE, this time with Jakks making role-play sets and action figures, only for Asian-Pacific region. Jakks would also work alongside Vivid Imaginations and Headstart Toys to make Ooshies, collectible rubber pencil tips. In June of that year, the company announced it had acquired the licensing rights for Batman v Superman.

The company purchased C’est Moi, a skincare and makeup brand for kids, for $300,000 in 2016. The skincare line was closed in October 2023.

In February 2017, Jakks and Warner Bros. Consumer Products signed a deal for DC Super Hero Girls related merchandise. Later that year in July, Jakks signed a deal with Chicco to manufacture and distribute inspired merchandise for the United States and Canada.

The San Diego, California-based company Disguise, a Halloween costume and decore manufacturer, was acquired in 2018.

Disguise, Jakks’ Halloween costume division, purchased rights to PAW Patrol: The Movie in 2021.

In January 2023, Jakks Pacific signed a deal with Nintendo and Illumination to create toys for The Super Mario Bros. Movie. In October 2023, Sega and Jakks Pacific formed a deal to make toys for Sonic the Hedgehog 3.

In May 2024, Jakks Pacific and its costume division, Disguise, partnered with Dav Pilkey to make merchandise based on the Dog Man comic book series and film. Later that year, in August, Jakks announced its partnership with Epic Story Media and released its new toy line, Wild Manes, a web series Wild Manes based on the toy line was released in July. The company also announced the release of its Simpsons-themed collectibles.
