= Umtech =

American personal computer company, 1976–1979

Umtech Incorporated
- Logo of the company doing business as VideoBrain
- Trade name: VideoBrain Computer Company
- Company type: Private
- Industry: Computers
- Founded: 1976; 50 years ago in Sunnyvale, California
- Founder: Albert Yu
- Defunct: 1979
- Fate: Merged into Cha Group
- Products: VideoBrain Family Computer
- Number of employees: Over 100 (1979)

Umtech Incorporated, also known as VideoBrain Computer Company, was an early entrant in the personal computer market that developed, manufactured, and marketed the first computer, VideoBrain, sold in department stores. Although VideoBrain generated major excitement and strong orders when it was introduced at the January 1978 Consumer Electronics Show (CES), consumers did not adopt it as readily as hoped. The company halted manufacturing in the spring of 1979 and was folded into the structure of its largest financial backer, the Cha Group.

== History ==
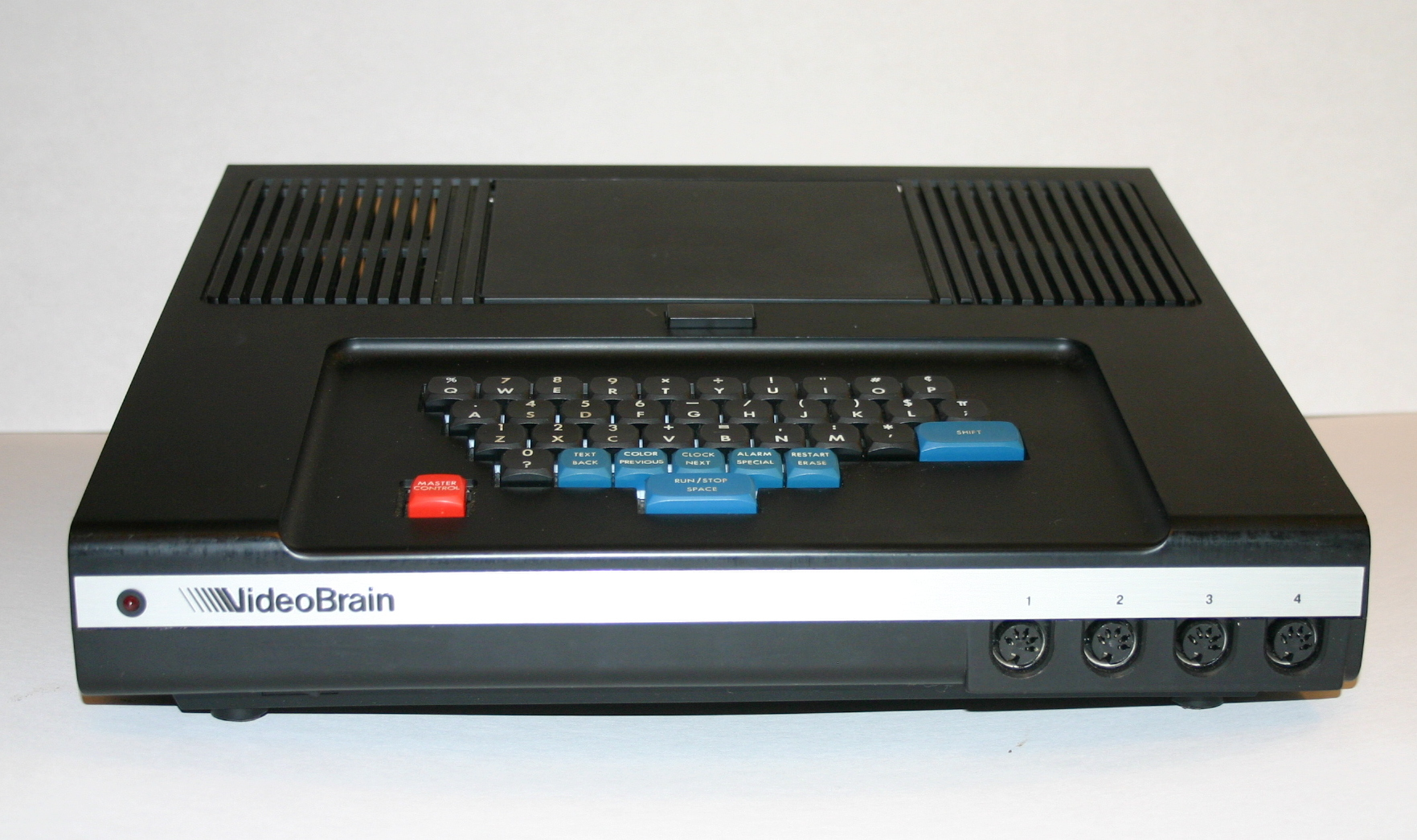
VideoBrain Computer Front View

Umtech was founded in 1976 by Dr. Albert Yu, an integrated circuit engineering manager at Intel who became Umtech’s President, and Dr. David Chung who led development of the F8 processor for Fairchild Semiconductor. It was based in Sunnyvale, California. The company was backed financially by Dr. Yu’s father-in-law, Cha Chi Ming, the principal of the Cha Group headquartered in Hong Kong. Some employees of the company later became minor shareholders through the exercise of employee stock options.

The company created the name VideoBrain for the computer it developed and then used the name VideoBrain Computer Company in marketing.

== Technology ==
=== Integrated circuits ===
The company developed two chips to facilitate displaying the computer’s output on a standard color television set. The UM1 chip controlled sixteen rectangular objects on the screen that could be manipulated in size and shape, placement on the screen, and image within the rectangle. Software could designate the color of the image and of the remaining space within the rectangle, usually the background color of the display which was also software selectable. The UM1 was in turn controlled by an F8 processor. The UM1 fed a stream of pixels into a FIFO buffer which passed them along to be converted into signals that were delivered to the RF antenna input of a television set. Because the UM1 delivered the pixels needed for every line on the raster scan of the TV, rather than using the same pixel stream for every two or more adjacent lines as in then current video games, the VideoBrain produced finer display resolution than most television sets could support. The UM1 chip (Patent #4,232,374) was designed by John Cosley and Len Chen under the direction of Dr. Chung.

A second chip, the UM2, was developed to serve as a clock for the entire system and to produce the NTSC (USA) and PAL (Europe) scanning video frames for the TV set. The PAL version of the UM2 was never manufactured or brought to market. Though a much simpler chip than the UM1, getting the UM2 into manufacturing was difficult because any flaw in timing, even once in millions of cycles, could bring the entire system down.

The masks used to create the proprietary chips were drawn by hand. The company tested its chips using its own stepper and chip tester.

=== Hardware and system design ===
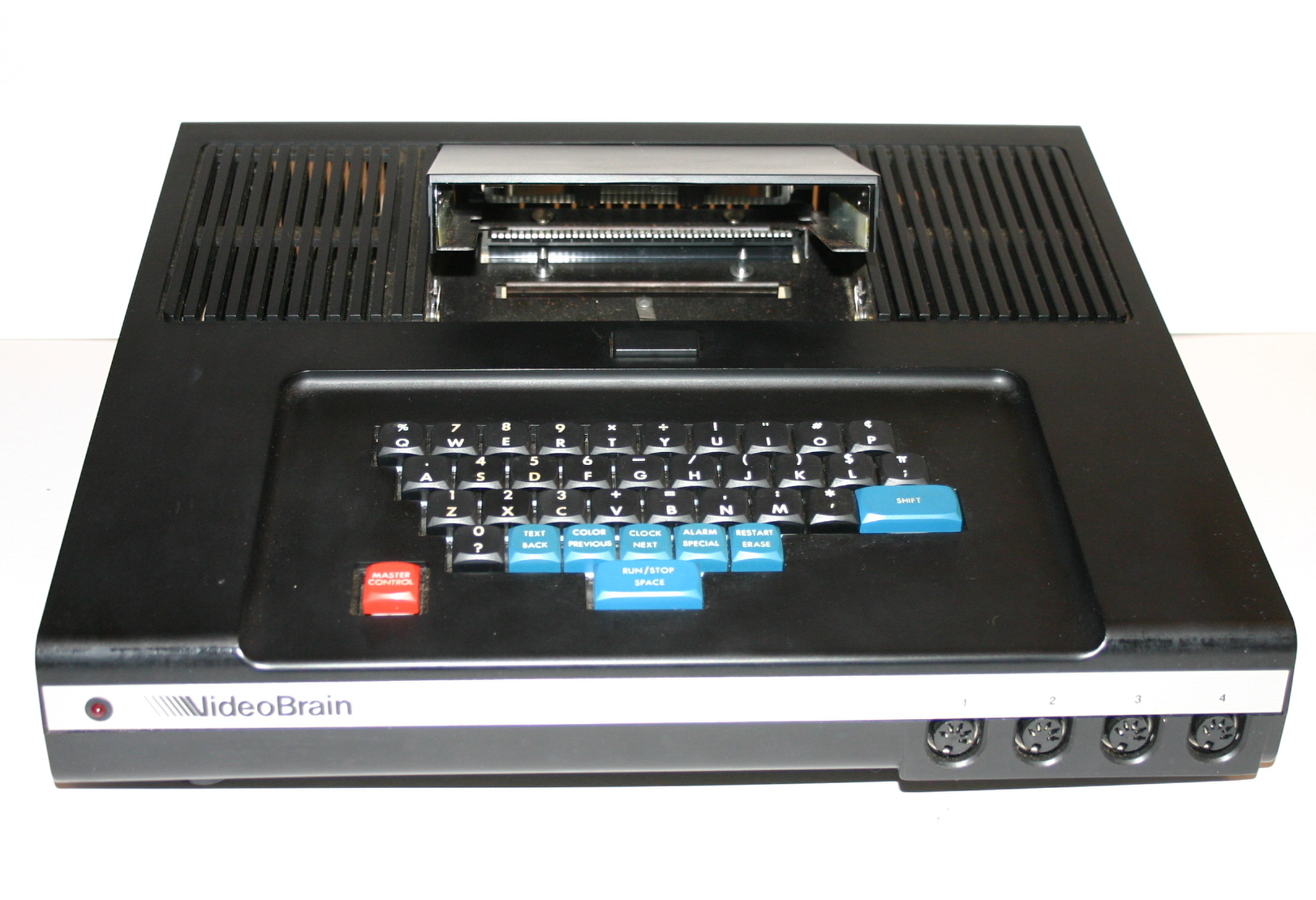
Cartridge Carrier Open

Like the later Apple MacIntosh, the VideoBrain did not allow the user to open the case and insert hardware components. Like the Commodore PET the keyboard was built into the computer. Taking a lesson from video games, VideoBrain was the first home or personal computer where software programs were stored on ROM chips and loaded into the system in cartridges. This was much easier and more reliable for consumers than loading software from cassette tapes or the notoriously fallible 5.25” diskettes.

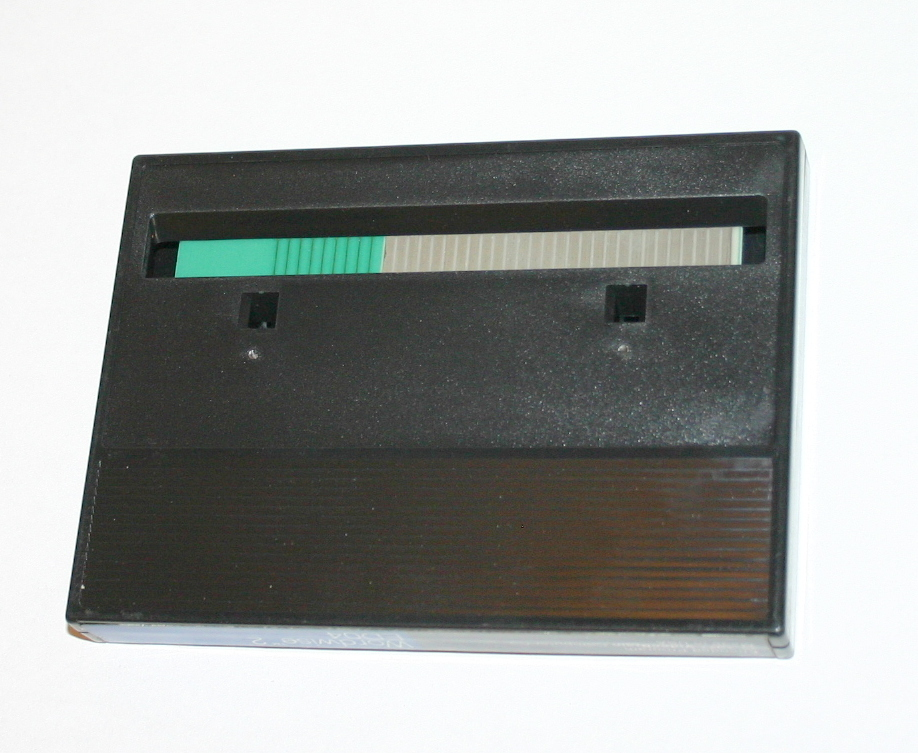
Bottom View of Cartridge

In addition to the F8 processor and the proprietary chips, the system contained 1K of RAM and 1K of resident software on ROM. Though the computer’s capabilities were very limited by today’s standards, it is impressive how much the developers were able to accomplish with this seemingly minuscule amount of memory.

VideoBrain featured a non-standard keyboard with 36 keys and a reset button labeled “Master Control”. The keys were level with each other and had very little travel when they were struck. This made typing somewhat difficult and also emphasized to anyone familiar with computers that the system’s capabilities were limited.

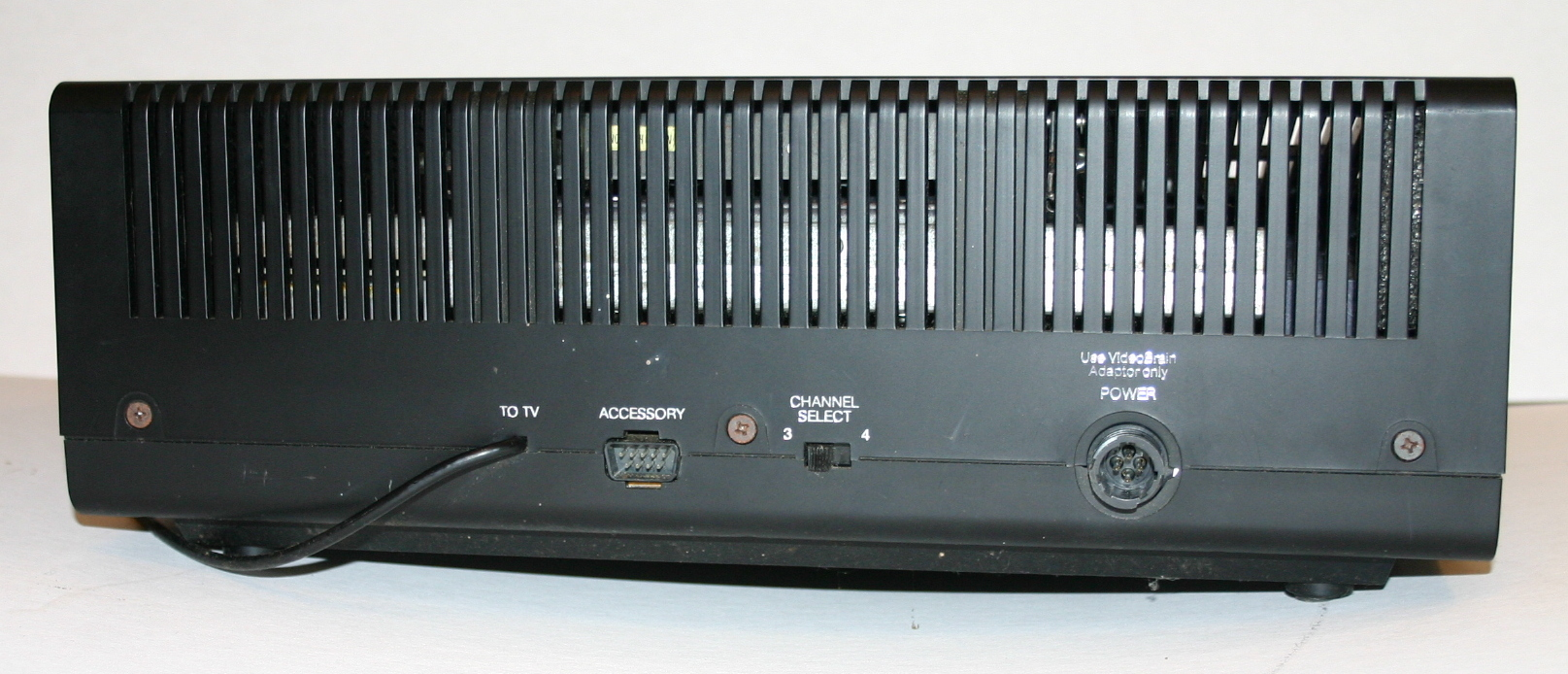
Back Panel of Computer

The system supported four plug-in joysticks and a port on the back that could connect to an extender product using proprietary signaling over an RS-232 physical interfaces. The extender product, and ROM cartridge that turned VideoBrain into a timeshare terminal, were sold in very small quantities. Other connections on the back panel were to the television display and to the external AC transformer. A switch on the back panel directed the TV signal to channel 3 or channel 4.

The motherboard was enclosed in a metal shield to meet Federal Communications Commission requirements for limiting radio frequency emissions. The external case was molded plastic, designed for low-cost high-volume manufacturing.

=== Software ===
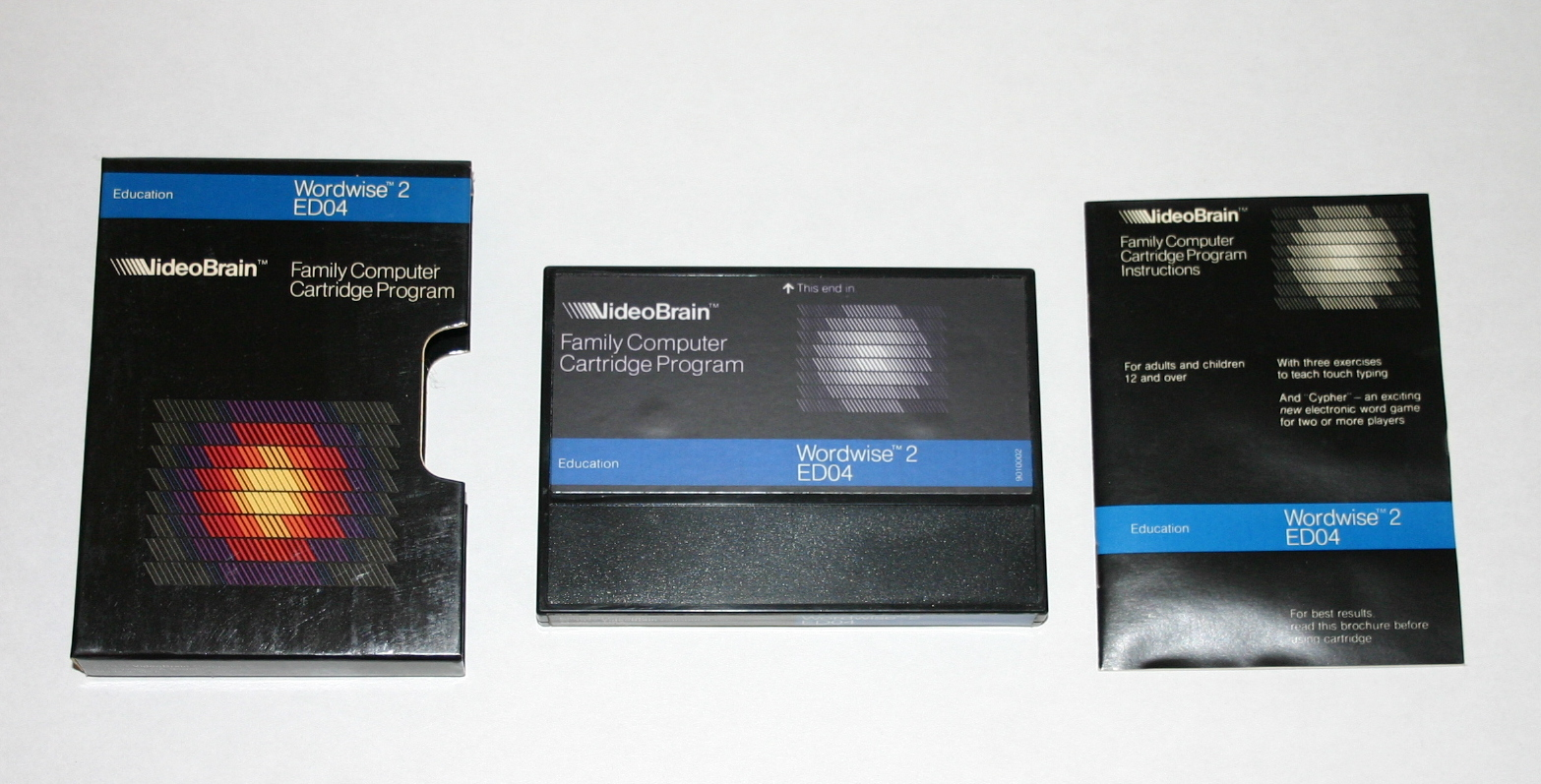
Software Cartridge with Box and Manual

The code was written in F-8 Assembly language, and then run through a translator/assembler on a Hewlett-Packard minicomputer to produce binary machine code. The resident 1K ROM contained basic start-up and operating code, images of letters and numbers, and four user-accessible programs – text, clock, alarm, and color.

Umtech developed and marketed fourteen software programs, six in the Education Series, six in the Entertainment Series, and two in the Money Management Category. The company developed but never offered for sale a cartridge with 1k of onboard RAM that made the computer programmable in a variation of the APL language, and an educational program called Old Regime that allowed users to simulate being a wealthy landowner in seventeenth century France.

A list of software programs can be found here

== Packaging, distribution, and marketing ==
The company never sold the computer by itself but always packaged it as a “system” with some software cartridges. The System 100, with three cartridges, sold for $500. The systems were initially delivered in a colorful, consumer-oriented box. The box was later changed to a larger, plainer, box to better protect the computer from shock.

The progress of marketing and sales can be seen in the following timeline:

- January 1977 – Marketing research trip to Consumer Electronics Show (CES) in Chicago
- Spring, 1977 – Umtech first meets with a manufacturer’s rep and with Interstate Electronics, an electronics distributor that becomes an important business partner

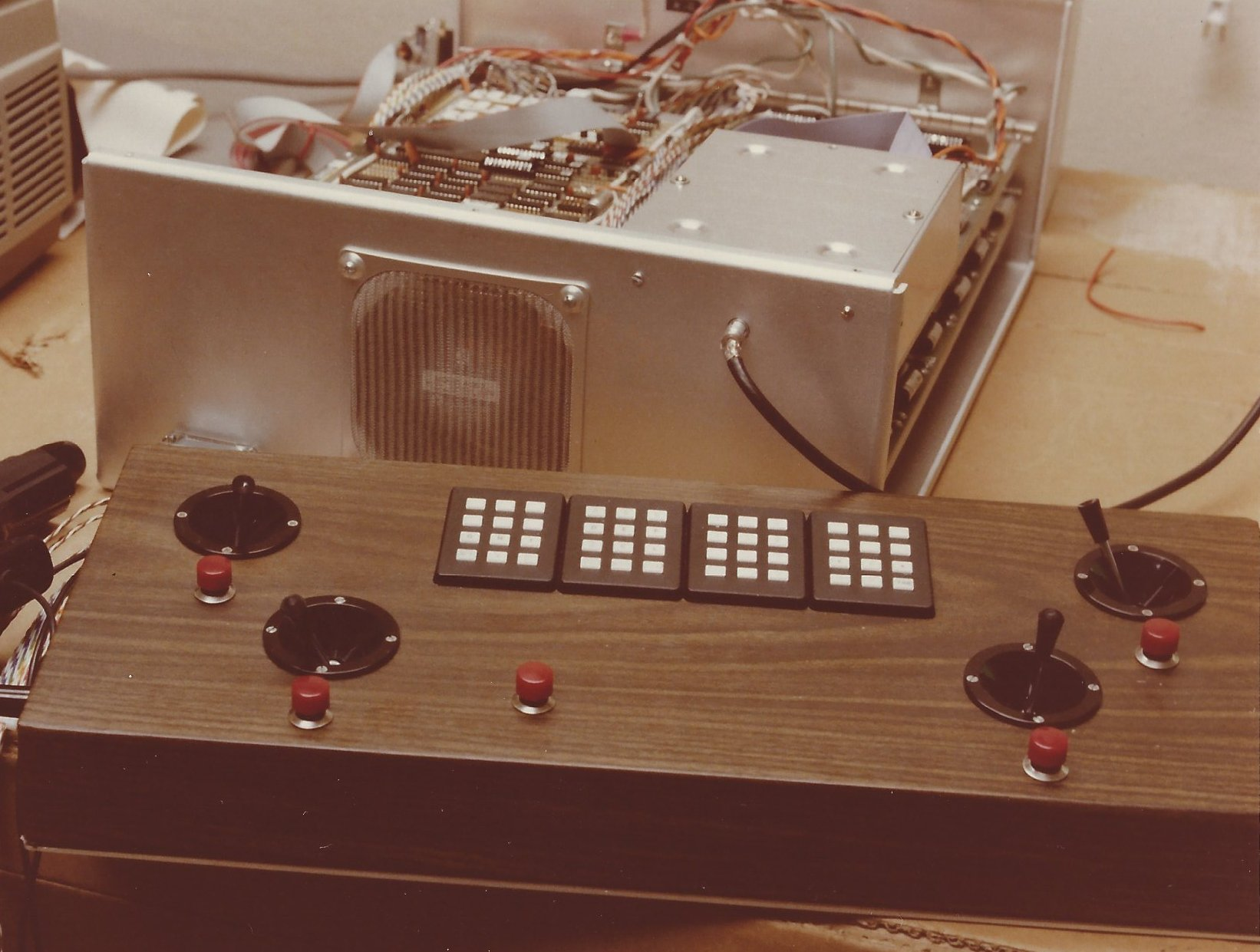
Traveling Prototype for Demonstrating Capabilities

- April 1977 – Umtech meets with a German distributor at the Hannover Messe industrial fair. Presents a mockup of the product and demonstrates software capabilities using a portable breadboard.
- June 1977 – Umtech meets with RadioShack and other retailers in a hotel suite at the CES show in Las Vegas.
- January 1978 – Umtech introduces VideoBrain to an enthusiastic response on the show floor at the winter CES show in Las Vegas. All aspects of marketing are high quality and professional – product packaging, show booth, brochures, displays, and employee presentations. The company garners more orders at the show ($2.5 million) than Apple. Orders come from Federated Department Stores (Macy’s, Bloomingdale's), Associated Dry Goods (Lord & Taylor, Robinsons, Goldwater's), Nordstrom and from many other department stores, computer stores, and electronics retailers.
- February 1978 – VideoBrain, presented by a representative of Interstate, appears on The Today Show with Jane Pauley. The computer is introduced at retail with a special promotion in a dedicated room at Macy's San Francisco. Macy's later reports that it was the biggest sales day in the electronics department in the history of Macy's.
- March 1978 – VideoBrain begins shipping but many department stores have cancelled their orders due to the absence of shipments since January.
- June 1978 – VideoBrain appears again in a booth at the CES show.
- January 1979 – VideoBrain does not appear on the floor at CES. Some manufacturer’s reps do not even pick up their commission checks from the Umtech hotel suite.

Umtech was introduced to Interstate Electronics, a distributor of consumer electronics located in Chicago, Illinois, and to a major distributor of consumer electronics in Germany by a Hong Kong businessman, Raymond Koo of Raitronics, who sold other products to these companies. Umtech also sold directly to some computer stores, like Computerland, and through manufacturer’s representatives. The rep that may have achieved the most success sold VideoBrain to military PX’s.

Umtech’s first advertising agency was Regis McKenna in Palo Alto, which also handled advertising for Intel and Apple. After the 1978 CES show, Apple insisted that the agency resign the Umtech account, which it did. Umtech then hired Wilton, Coombs & Colnett of San Francisco. To pull the product through retailers, Umtech advertised the product in popular and computer-oriented magazines. VideoBrain's first position as a "family computer" was changed to "home computer" during 1978. In both cases the suggestion of multiple users within a household sought to justify the price of the product.

== Facilities and manufacturing ==
The company began research and development in 1976 in David Chung’s living room in Palo Alto, California then moved in October to a small space on Sobrante Way in Sunnyvale. In 1977 the company moved to larger facilities on Wolfe Road in Sunnyvale and later added adjoining space in the same building. Here the company began low volume manufacturing. In 1978 Umtech moved to larger space on Patrick Henry Drive in Santa Clara and set up a volume manufacturing facility. When the company cut back its operations and moved to a small space in Palo Alto, it very profitably sub-leased the Patrick Henry facility to ROLM.

== Employees ==
At one point in 1979 Umtech grew to over 100 employees. Key managers and personnel included the following:

- Dr. Albert Yu - President
- David Chung - Vice President of Engineering and Marketing
- John Cosley – Chief Chip, Hardware, and System Engineer
- Len Chen – Chip Design Engineer
- Bob Frankovich – Director of Design Automation
- Niall Shapero – Senior Software Engineer
- Pavel Stoffel – Senior Software Engineer
- Mike Hall - Senior Software Engineer
- Bruce Mackay – Director of Manufacturing
- Bob Samuel - Manufacturing Engineer
- Ed Alemany - Customer Service Manager
- Richard Melmon – Director of Marketing
- Darhsiung (Dash) Chang – Product Manager
- Ted Haynes – Marketing Manager and Product Manager

== Umtech’s place in personal computer history ==
VideoBrain was a visionary attempt to skip years ahead in personal computers - before consumers were ready for it and before technology was prepared to support the vision. Although the public was largely oblivious to microcomputers in the late seventies, there were business people who believed passionately that personal computers would be an enormous market with tremendous impact. They were right in the long run but they were ahead of their time.

VideoBrain was the first personal computer to make loading and running software easy and reliable. In an era when floppy disks were uncommon and expensive, VideoBrain loaded software via ROM cartridges. VideoBrain was the first personal computer to be packaged and sold through department stores as a consumer product. Unfortunately the idea of buying and using a computer (or even touching it in the store) was intimidating to most consumers. To those familiar with computers, VideoBrain did not offer enough capability and flexibility to be useful. It could not be user programmed, the keyboard was limited, and the 1K of RAM could not be expanded. On the other hand, VideoBrain was too expensive to compete with video games.

While consumer channels regrouped after VideoBrain, personal computer manufacturers turned their attention from hobbyists to business. It seems the Apple Macintosh capitalized on Umtech’s experience a few years later when it came out as a system where the user was not expected to open the case to add or delete hardware. With glamorous marketing, Apple made consumers comfortable that, as intended for VideoBrain, they could bring a computer home, plug it in, and use it easily.
