= VideoBrain Family Computer =

Defunct home computer model

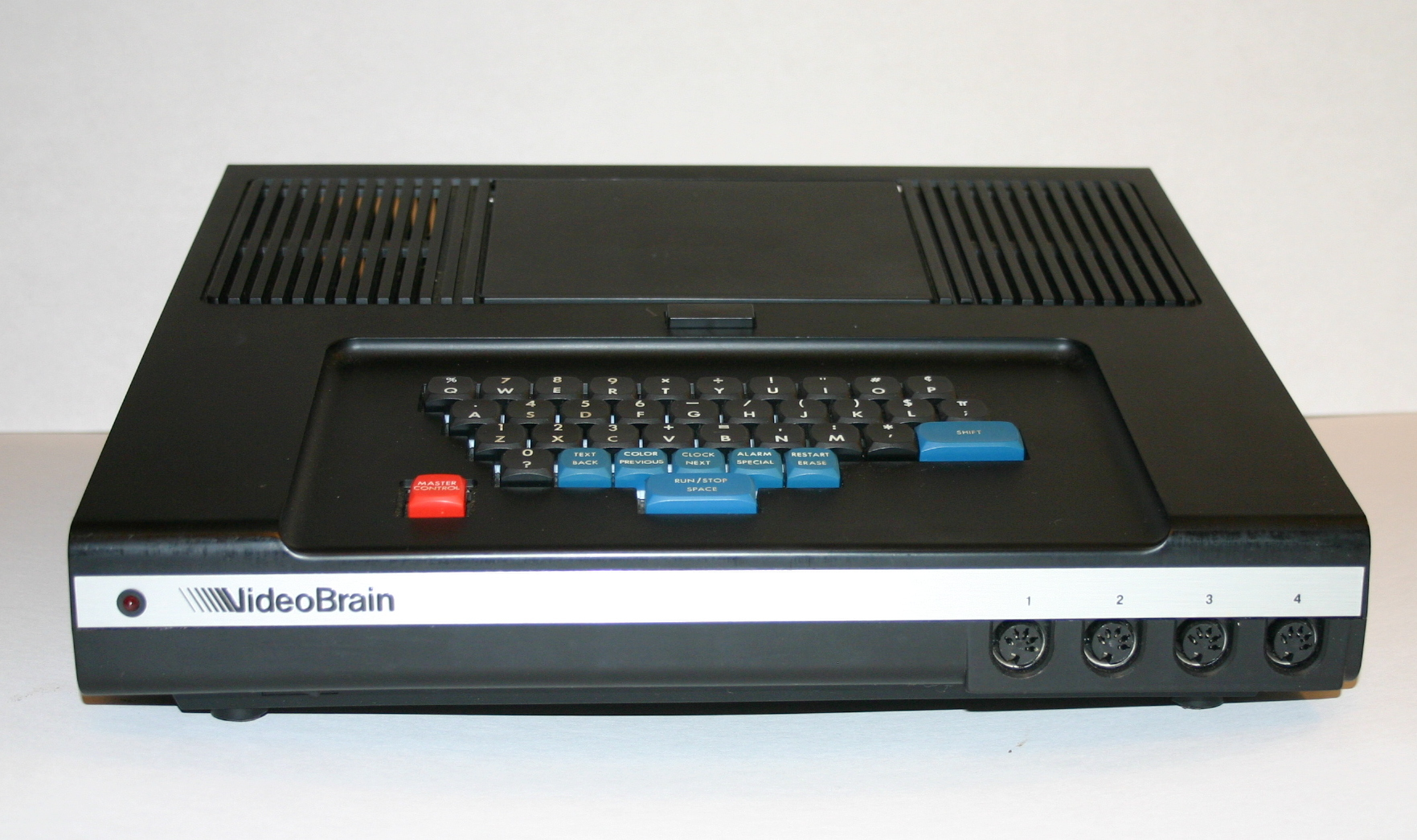
- A front view of the VideoBrain computer
- Manufacturer: Umtech Incorporated
- Type: Home computer
- Released: 1977; 49 years ago
- CPU: Fairchild F8
- Memory: 1 kilobytes RAM
- Removable storage: Cartridges
- Display: RF connector to TV, 384 x 336 graphics, 128 x 56 semigraphic, 16 colors
- Graphics: UV-201, UV-202
- Input: 36-key keyboard
- Controller input: Joysticks

The VideoBrain Family Computer (model 101) is an 8-bit home computer manufactured by Umtech Incorporated, starting in 1977. It is based on the Fairchild Semiconductor F8 CPU. It was not a large commercial success and was discontinued from the market less than three years after its initial release. Some of its lack of success has been attributed to the decision to substitute the APL/S programming language over the then-standard BASIC. Due to the high cost of RAM memory, it only contained 1 KB. It had a full-travel keyboard, unlike some early home computers that featured membrane keypads (and earlier kit machines that used switches), but with a very non-standard layout. It was designed by David Chung and Albert Yu.

== History ==
The VideoBrain Family Computer was designed and produced by Umtech Inc., doing business as the VideoBrain Computer Company of California in 1977. It was not widely available, although Macy's department store briefly carried the computer on its shelves. It was sold in various configurations, and the price ranged from $500 to $1100 depending on the accessories chosen. New software for the VideoBrain was available on cartridge, which was a first for home computer systems (Later price reductions brought costs down to $300 for the computer by itself, and $350–900 for the packaged deals).

Available software ranged in price from $20 to $40 for video games and educational software, and $70 to $150 for productivity tools.

== Design ==
Boxes of Tennis and Pinball cartridges for VideoBrain Family Computer

The VideoBrain Family Computer was built around the F8 processor from Fairchild Semiconductor, and featured 1KB of RAM and a 4KB ROM. It was able to output 384 x 336 graphics and 128 x 56 semigraphic characters in 16 colors, (based on UV-201 and UV-202 proprietary chips) and sound to a connected television set through an RF connector. By far its most striking feature was the 36-key keyboard - though the keyboard of the VideoBrain was poorly designed and difficult to use, keyboards were not available on any of the more common video game consoles of the time. Some popular kit-based computers also typically lacked a keyboard, opting for toggle switches instead. The system also features four joystick ports, a cartridge connector, and an expansion port.

The system included four built-in software titles, available if the unit is powered on without a cartridge inserted - a simple text editor, a clock, a countdown timer, and a Color Bar generator.

Two additional hardware modules were marketed that would extend the capabilities of the VideoBrain. The Expander 1 was an interface to various I/O devices. It allowed users to connect a cassette tape recorder for saving or loading data, and included two RS-232 ports for attaching a printer and the Expander 2. The Expander 2 was a 300 baud acoustic modem used by a single program (Timeshare) that allowed the VideoBrain to act as a terminal when dialed into a compatible mainframe computer.

Additional software was sold on cartridges measuring approximately the size of a Betamax tape. The cartridge interface was unique: unlike most video game systems, VideoBrain cartridges had an exposed strip of conductive traces that simply lie flush against a set of pins on the computer itself. Cartridges could contain up to 12KiB of data.

Patent 4232374 titled "Segment Ordering for Television Receiver Control Unit" describes the VideoBrain display hardware.

== Images ==
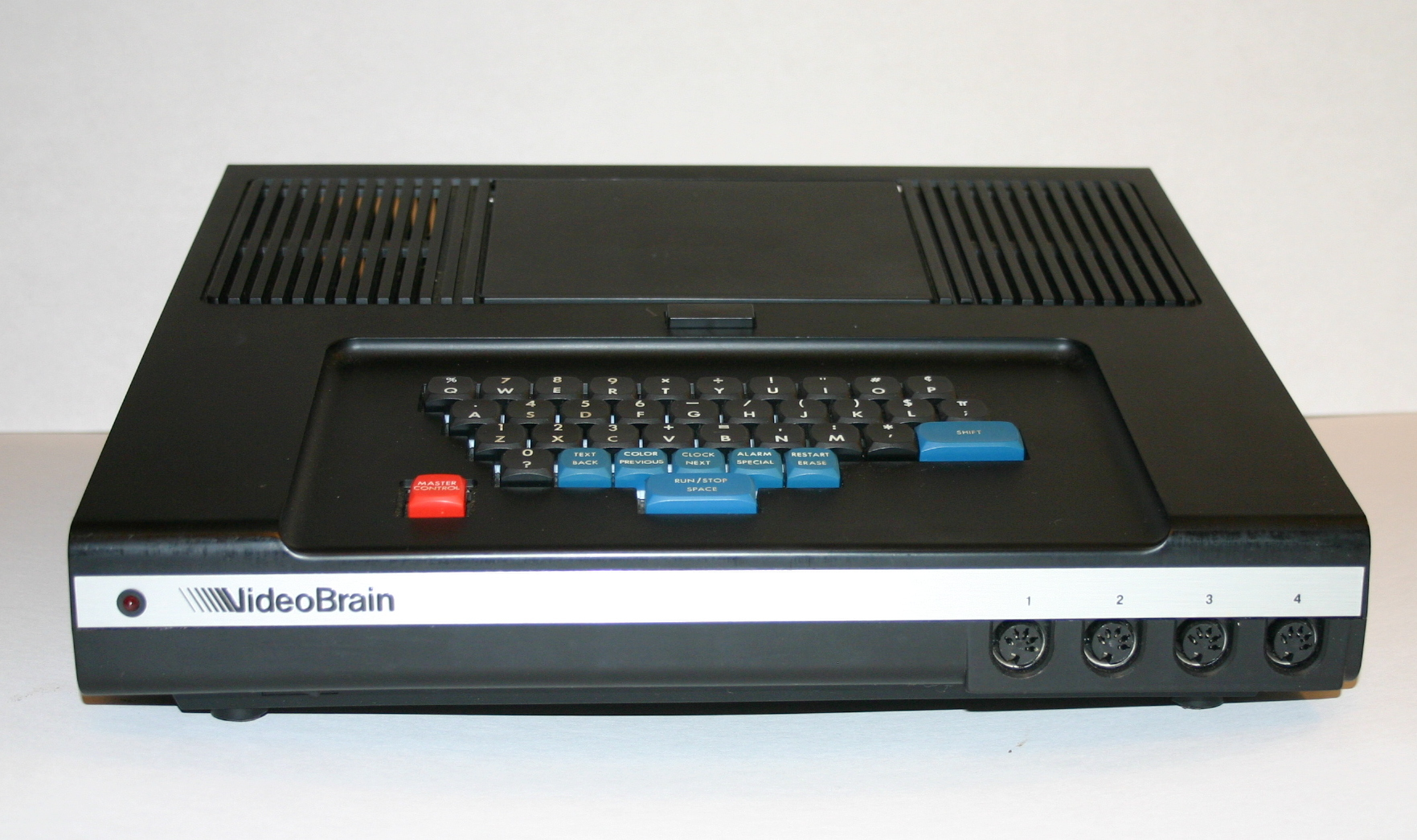
VideoBrain Family Computer - Front View

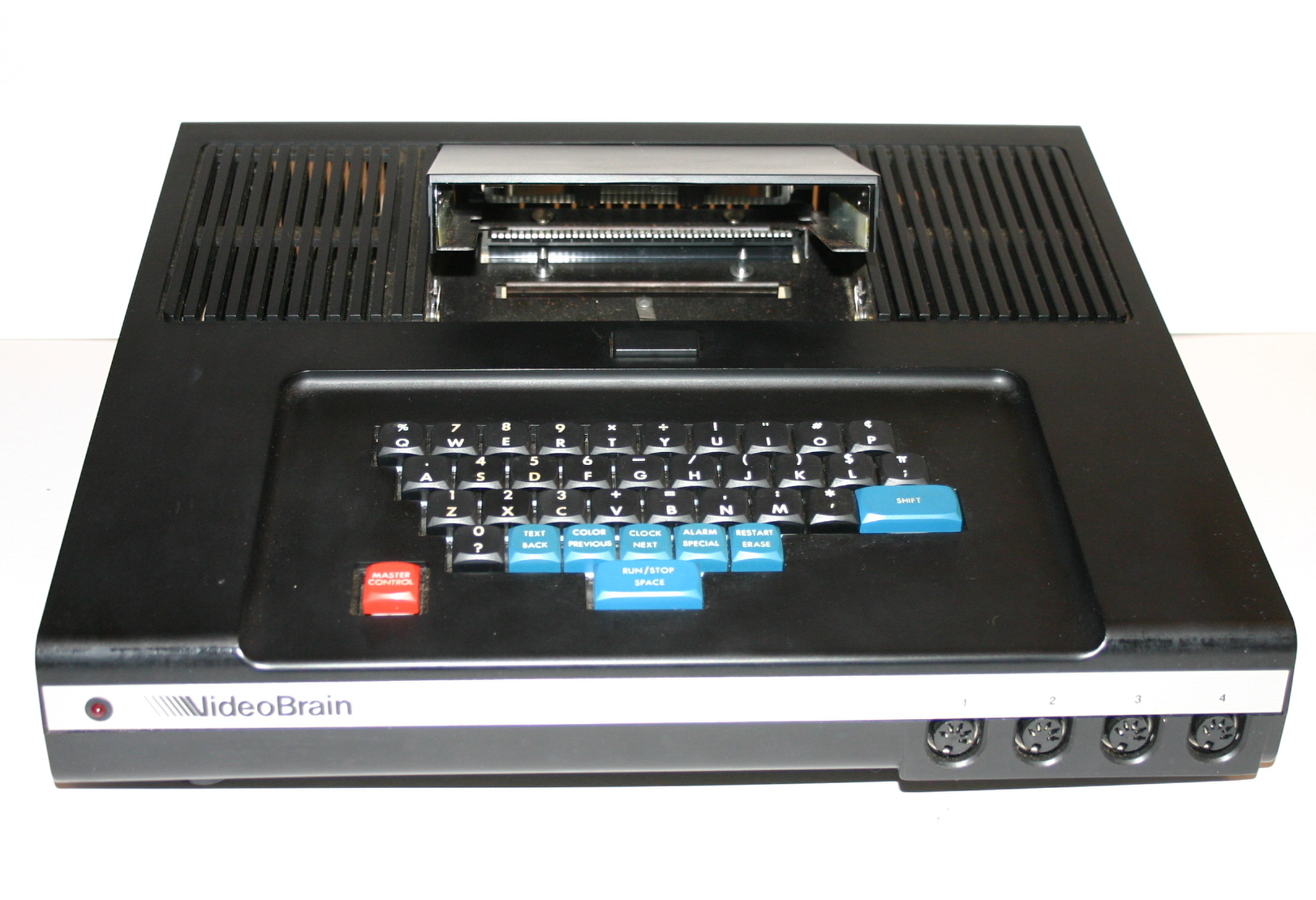
VideoBrain Computer with Cartridge Carrier Open

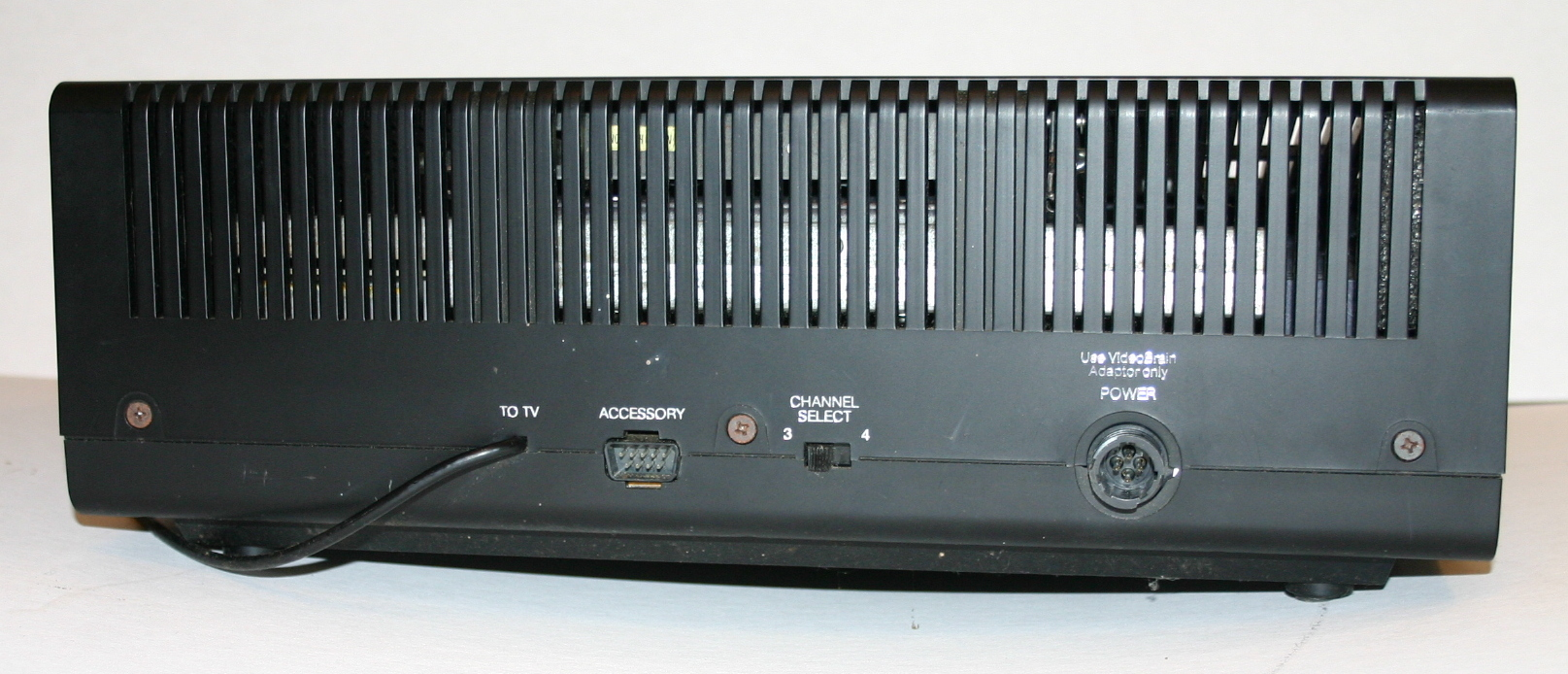
VideoBrain Home Computer Back Panel

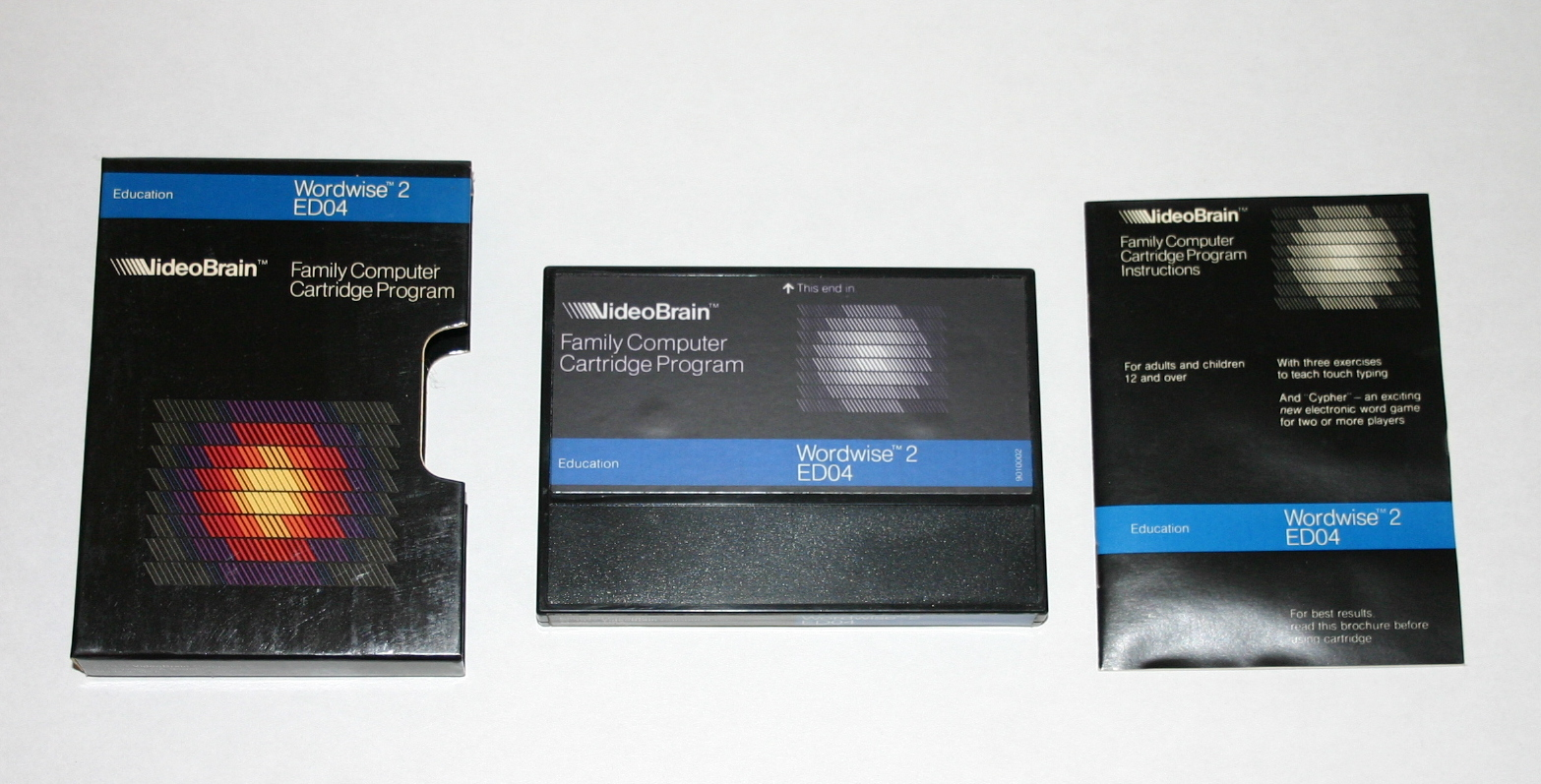
VideoBrain Cartridge with Box and Manual

"VideoBrain: Screen Captures" at HCVGM

== Software ==
Because the VideoBrain computer was discontinued so quickly, fewer than 25 software titles were ever marketed for the system. The library comprises a handful of games, educational titles, and productivity software.

=== Released Titles ===
VideoBrain Family Computer titles
Title	Model	Description	Cite
APL/S: The Computational Language	APL/S	APL/S - the only programming language available for the VideoBrain. The tape connections of the Expander 1 can be used to load and save programs.	
Timeshare	CM01	The only program to use the Expander 2. This gives the user access the data banks of other computers with which the user is doing business, in effect transforming the VideoBrain into a timeshare terminal.	
Music Teacher 1	ED01	This program converts the keyboard into a piano keyboard, teaching users how to sight-read, compose, and play music in a 4-octave range. Music that the user composes can be played back via the VideoBrain using the television's speakers. Two pre-encoded songs come built-in on the cartridge: "Happy Birthday" and "Row, Row, Row Your Boat".	
Math Tutor 1	ED02	This program teaches users addition, subtraction, multiplication, and division. There are four skill levels, and the option for a third party to create a math problem for the user to solve.	
Wordwise 1	ED03	This program functions as a four-player educational game. Each player is given a random assortment of ten letters which must be organized into words. At the end of each round, points are awarded for words formed, and a winner is selected. The program features three skill levels that can be assigned to each player individually.	
Wordwise 2	ED04	The program is intended to familiarize users with the VideoBrain keyboard. Users are subjected to a number of touch-typing exercises and are presented with a final words per minute count. An educational word game is also available on the same cartridge.	
VideoArtist	ED05	This program allows users to create original designs in 16 digital colors, add special effects and animated motion.	
Lemonade Stand	ED06	This program functions as an educational business simulation game. Users operate a virtual lemonade stand where decisions like how much lemonade to produce, how much to charge, and how much to spend on advertising must be weighed against a variety of market factors including market competition and the vagaries of the weather.	
Gladiator	EN01	This video game cartridge provides players with three basic games. In Ancient Gladiator, players use bow and arrow to fight and defend against hungry lions and other players. In Modern Gladiator, players must run or pass to two different receivers to score points. And in Future Gladiator, players control laser-firing spaceships in an interstellar setting. The games can be played in a multiplayer format or versus the computer. Player-set variables allow for as many as 381 variations in gameplay.	
Pinball	EN02	This video game cartridge simulates a pinball machine. Using two joysticks (one for each flipper), players take turns trying to score as many points as possible with the five balls they start with. Points are awarded for sending the ball into the "thumper-bumpers".	
Tennis	EN03	This video game cartridge simulates the game of Tennis. There are four points per game, and six games per set. Player-set variables including curve balls, net rushing, handicapping, and varying skill and speed settings allow for as many as 96 variations in gameplay. Pre-defined game modes such as "Bounce-Back" (wherein players must bounce the ball off of the net and back to themselves once before hitting the ball over the net) are also available.	
Checkers	EN04	This video game cartridge simulates the standard game of Checkers. The game can be played versus other players or versus the computer with four different skill settings: Defensive, Aggressive, Super-Intelligent, and Not Quite Championship Caliber.	
Blackjack	EN05	This video game cartridge simulates the standard game of Blackjack. One or several players play against the computer which acts as the house. Each player starts with $500 and can bet up to $250 per game. Winning rewards players with a song and 1.5 times the bet.	
Vice Versa	EN06	This video game cartridge simulates the game of Reversi.	
Demonstration	ST01	This cartridge was intended for store displays as a way to show off the VideoBrain's capabilities.	
Financier	VB-81	This cartridge shipped with the VideoBrain, and could be used to solve financial equations. It functions as an expanded calculator with twelve built-in formulae for calculating such things as mortgage cost, accumulated principal and interest, compound interest, and depreciation among others.	
Money Minder (Money Manager)	VB-1000	This cartridge acts as personal accounting software, allowing the creation of detailed personal financial information that could be saved on audiocassette tapes via the VideoBrain's Expander 1 port.	

=== Other Titles, Release Status Mostly Unknown ===
VideoBrain Family Computer titles
Title	Model	Description	Cite
Musicianship 1	ED07	Planned sequel to Music Teacher 1. renamed to Musicianship 1. Unreleased, Prototype cartriages are reported to exist.	
Number Cross	ED08		
Historical Simulation - France In The Old Regime	ED09	Unreleased, Reached Prototype stage. Image of program exists within a VideoBrain advert, although is unverified.	
Challenge Racer	EN07		
Music Programmer	EN08		
Programmable Football	EN09		
Computer Life	EN10		
The Programmable [BASIC programming language]	VB-59		
Budget System	VB-1100	Rumored to have been in development. Likely similar to Money Minder.	
Information Manager	VB-1200	One prototype cart found 2015. There are no known manuals.	

== Reception ==
The VideoBrain largely failed to achieve commercial viability for a number of reasons. Poor design decisions hindered user acceptance; for example, the VideoBrain's confusing and user-unfriendly keyboard made even simple text entry a tedious process. Moreover, the computer did not offer the then-popular programming language BASIC, forcing users to instead adopt APL/S - a far more obscure and difficult programming language. Finally, the VideoBrain software library had trouble reaching a key audience. Most available software was aimed at productivity or educational markets, and lacked any variety of entertainment titles.

Perhaps the largest contributor to the VideoBrain's failure was simply a lack of proper marketing and hardware availability. Public understanding of computers in 1977 was significantly lower than it is today, and many potential consumers simply did not understand the benefits of owning a home computer. Additionally, the VideoBrain was mainly sold through mail-order outfits, and only made a brief retail showing at Macy's Department Stores. (By contrast, video game consoles at the time were easily available in a number of department and toy chains, allowing them to far outsell the VideoBrain Computer System).

Albert Yu said, in a 2005 interview, that he had invited Andy Grove to look over the system and he was skeptical – wondering who would want to buy a computer for the home. Yu also said Grove was skeptical about the Apple II as well but Yu felt that the Apple was successful because it targeted a market (computer enthusiasts) that was easier to sell to. The Apple was also quite a bit more powerful and more expensive. It was an open system, with many expansion slots and fully documented software and hardware – to target the enthusiast community. Although it lacked lowercase, its keyboard was both full-travel and of a normal layout. The VideoBrain, by contrast, was a much more closed design targeting home users with more simplicity and low cost. Even the keyboard was simplified, in terms of the number of keys. Apple created closed systems designed around simplicity later, such as the original Macintosh (which eschewed slots, hard disk support, and the numeric keypad) and the much later iMac (which eschewed slots and the floppy disk).

== See also ==
- Fairchild Channel F, a video game console built on the same F8 CPU as the VideoBrain.
- Exidy Sorcerer, a competing home computer system at the time
- Interact Home Computer, another competing home computer system
