= Puzzle Panic =

1984 video game

- Publisher: Epyx
- Designers: Ken Uston; Bob Polin; Ron Karr
- Platforms: Atari 8-bit, Commodore 64, MSX
- Release: 1984
- Genre: Puzzle

Puzzle Panic, also known as Ken Uston's Puzzle Panic, is a puzzle video game created by blackjack strategist Ken Uston, Bob Polin (designer of Blue Max), and Ron Karr. It was published by Epyx in 1984 for the Atari 8-bit computers and Commodore 64.

== Gameplay ==
Gameplay screenshot (Atari 8-bit)

The player guides Benny, a light bulb, through a series of 11 puzzles, each with varying difficulty settings (a total of over 40 levels). At the completion of each level, there are a few available exits, each bearing an obscure symbol, which take Benny forward or back in the game (or possibly to repeat the level). The final level, the "Metasequence," is a cryptic puzzle with a non-explicit objective. Its original purpose was part of a contest: those who solved it correctly by the August 13, 1984 deadline could enter in a drawing to win a weekend at an Atlantic City casino with co-creator Ken Uston.

== Development ==
A pre-release version of the game was called PuzzleMania.

== Reception ==
Steve Panak wrote in ANALOG Computing, "Puzzle Panic is so radically different, so unlike anything else you've ever set your cathode-raybloodshot eyes on, that there's no readily memorable program to compare it with," and called the game "addictive." He disliked the brief window for winning the contest; it had already expired by the time he played.

Fred Pinho wrote in Antic:

Puzzle Panic is a nice blend of puzzle solving, strategy and arcade action. The puzzles are nowhere as frustrating as the typical adventure game. Neither are the arcade segments as demanding as the typical shoot-em-up. For those not gifted with the joystick touch (the majority of us), this game will give a sense of accomplishment since every screen is conquerable.
