= Ken Uston's Guide to Buying and Beating the Home Video Games =

1982 book by Ken Uston

- Author: Ken Uston
- Language: English
- Subject: Video Games
- Genre: Entertainment
- Publisher: Signet
- Publication date: May 1982
- Pages: 676

Ken Uston's Guide to Buying and Beating the Home Video Games was published in May 1982. The book, published by Signet in New York, was a brief strategy guide for many console games in existence at the time. The book was divided into chapters by console type or manufacturer, and each chapter had an article on each game title available for that console. The book was published in paperback, with 676 pages and illustrated throughout with black and white line drawings.

Ken Uston was a blackjack player, and at the time this book was published, had already had six books in print. Two of his previous books included Mastering Pac-Man (1981) and Score! Beating The Top 16 Video Games in 1982, dealing with standalone arcade games, which also had a "short intro to the Atari VCS, Intellivision, Odyssey2 home systems and some Coleco and Entex table-top games."

The book was intended as both a guide to selecting a video game console from a growing market of then-expensive entertainment systems, and as a brief guide to gameplay of each game, however not necessarily for beating them. Some of the systems have enjoyed a resurgence in the 21st century (Intellivision, for example), giving the book a slight degree of longevity in its original purpose, and the book remains a useful capsule history of available games and systems in 1982.

== Chapter titles ==
- Home Video Game Systems - a brief description of each system.
- A comparison of the systems and games.
- Atari 2600
- Intellivision
- Magnavox Odyssey²
- Activision
- Astrocade, The Professional Arcade
- Fairchild Channel F
- Apollo
- Imagic

Each game article (over 200 in number) was divided into sections (some sections were combined or omitted depending on the article):

- Evaluation
- Basic Objective
- Scenario
- The Board
- Controls
- Facts You Should Know
- Strategies

== Reviews ==
- Games

== See also ==
Jeff Rovin's The Complete Guide to Conquering Video Games and his "How to Win at" video game book series.
