= Ken Uston =

American blackjack player, strategist and author

Kenneth Senzo Usui (Ken Uston)
- Born: Kenneth Senzo Usui; January 12, 1935; New York City, US
- Died: September 19, 1987 (aged 52); Paris, France
- Occupations: Professional gambler, writer
- Spouse: Betty
- Children: 3

Ken Uston (January 12, 1935 – September 19, 1987) was an American blackjack player, strategist and author, credited with popularizing the concept of team play at blackjack. During the early to mid-1970s he gained widespread notoriety for perfecting techniques to do team card counting in numerous casinos worldwide, earning millions of dollars from the casinos, with bets as high as $12,000 on a single hand.

He was banned from casinos around the world and would adopt various costumes in order to conceal his identity and still be able to play. He filed a high-profile lawsuit against these casinos and successfully received a ruling from the New Jersey courts that absent a valid New Jersey Casino Commission regulation excluding card counters, casinos could not ban someone simply for counting cards at blackjack. In response, many casinos changed their systems, increasing the number of decks in games or changing rules to increase the house edge.

In the early 1980s, Uston authored several popular books on video games and personal computers. He was the subject of a 1981 segment on 60 Minutes and in 2005, he was the subject of the History Channel documentary, "The Blackjack Man".

== History ==
Uston was born Kenneth Senzo Usui in New York City, the oldest of three children born to Elsie Lubitz, a native of Austria and Senzo Usui, a Japanese immigrant and businessman. At the age of 16, Uston was accepted to and henceforth began attending Yale University, where he was a member of Phi Beta Kappa. Shortly after graduating from Yale, he earned an MBA from Harvard University. He became district manager of the Southern New England Telephone Co., then a senior management consultant with Cresap, McCormick & Paget in San Francisco, where he relocated with his wife and two daughters. After several years in consulting, he became corporate planning manager for American Cement in Los Angeles before returning to San Francisco where he became a Senior Vice-president at the Pacific Stock Exchange. On weekends, beginning in his years at Cresap, he read Thorp's 1964 book Beat the Dealer and began to spend time in the casinos, becoming what the Cleveland Plain Dealer called "a genius card-counter". Uston was also a talented musician, proficient on the bass as well as the piano. He was frequently asked to play in several San Francisco jazz clubs.

=== Blackjack ===
In a 1983 Blackjack Forum interview, Uston related that he became fascinated by blackjack and its inherent strategies after meeting professional gambler Al Francesco in a poker game. Francesco had recently launched the first "big player" type of blackjack card counting team, and he recruited Uston to be one of his main team players. Their system was that members of the team would play at different tables around a casino, counting cards. When a count became extremely positive, they would flag the "big player" member of the team who would come in and place large bets. This technique would prevent the increased bet spread from being noticed by the pit bosses. On his first five-day run, the team won $44,100, of which Uston's share was $2,100. After two months of being a counter, Uston was promoted to "Big Player".

Uston co-authored a book entitled The Big Player (1977) with Roger Rapoport in which he shared credit for many of his card-counting successes with his fellow team members, including noted Blackjack master-strategist Bill Erb.

In 1978, the year legal gambling began in Atlantic City, New Jersey, Uston moved to the area and formed a profitable blackjack team of his own (discussed at length in a 2005 Blackjack Forum interview with team member Darryl Purpose). As with most other casinos around the globe, Uston was soon barred from playing at those locations within Atlantic City as well. After he was barred in January 1979 by Resorts International, he filed a lawsuit, claiming that casinos did not have the right to bar skilled players. In Uston v. Resorts International Hotel Inc., 445 A.2d 370 (N.J. 1982), the New Jersey Supreme Court ruled that Atlantic City casinos did not have the authority to decide whether card counters could be barred absent a valid New Jersey Casino Commission regulation excluding card counters. To date, New Jersey casinos—by statute—are not allowed to bar them. In response to Uston's legal victory, Atlantic City casinos began adding decks, moving up shuffle points, and taking other measures to decrease a skilled player's potential advantage.

After his numerous casino barrings—now on his own and without a team—Uston adopted a wide variety of physical disguises in order to continue to play blackjack. He was also known for his aggressive approach along with his flamboyant playing style. In an article in Blackjack Forum, Arnold Snyder describes playing with Ken Uston at Circus Circus Las Vegas near the end of Uston's life. He states that Uston was disguised as a worker from Hoover Dam and got away with spreading his bets from table minimum to table maximum on a single-deck game. Since this took place at a time when card counting was well understood by casino executives and managers, and since the primary clue by which casinos detect card counting is a card counter's "bet spread" pattern, most card counters would also consider Uston a genius of disguise, and/or "card counting camouflage".

After The Big Player, Uston wrote Million Dollar Blackjack (1981). This book includes details about professional gamblers' techniques for gaining an advantage at the game. Uston also authored a companion piece, Ken Uston on Blackjack.

=== Video games and computers ===
In an interview published in Video Games, Uston revealed he got hooked on the games Pong and then Breakout. In 1979 Space Invaders became his video game of choice and, after his blackjack team made $350,000 in Atlantic City, they rented a house in California and bought a Space Invaders machine. The game appealed to him in part because of the trick of counting one's shots to get the maximum number of points for the spaceship at the top of the screen.

In 1981, Uston began frequenting the Easy Street Pub near the Playboy Casino in Atlantic City. It was there he began a competition with some other regulars for having the high score on the bar's Pac-Man arcade game. He realized the game had patterns and, in order to gain an advantage, he began experimenting and writing them down on diagrams of the maze he had created, but he was unable to go beyond a certain level. On a trip back to San Francisco, he came across two Chinese-American boys by the names of "Tommy" and "Raymond" who taught him how to go further in the game. People had been telling Uston he should write a book about Pac-Man, but he had felt he didn't have enough knowledge. After receiving lessons from the two boys, Uston decided to go ahead with the book, titled Mastering Pac-Man, and wrote it in four days. It appeared in the New York Times Best Seller list.

Uston wrote several more books about video games and home computers during the 1980s. He also licensed his name to Coleco for the ColecoVision game Ken Uston's Blackjack/Poker. In 1983, Screenplay published software titled Ken Uston's Profe$$ional Blackjack for the Apple II, Atari 8-bit computers, Commodore 64, and IBM PC to assist in the learning and practice of Uston's relatively complex, yet highly accurate card-counting techniques.

He was also credited with the idea for the 1984 game Puzzle Panic.

== Personal life ==
Uston was married three times; all of his marriages ended in divorce. He had three children.

On the morning of September 19, 1987, Uston, age 52, was found dead in his rented apartment in Paris. The cause of death was listed as heart failure.

== Bibliography ==
=== Blackjack ===
- The Big Player, 1977 (ISBN 0-03-016921-6)
- One Third of a Shoe
- Million Dollar Blackjack, 1981, Carol Publishing Group. (ISBN 0-89746-068-5)
- Ken Uston on Blackjack (ISBN 0-942637-56-9)

=== Video games ===
- Mastering Pac-Man, 1981 (ISBN 0-451-11899-5)
- Ken Uston's Guide to Buying and Beating the Home Video Games, 1982 (ISBN 0-451-11901-0)
- Ken Uston's Home Video '83, 1982 (ISBN 0-451-12010-8)
- Score! Beating the Top 16 Video Games, 1982 (ISBN 0-451-11813-8)

=== Computers ===
- Ken Uston's Guide to Home Computers, 1983 (ISBN 0-451-12597-5)
- Ken Uston's Illustrated Guide to the Adam, 1984 (ISBN 0-13-514647-X)
- Ken Uston's Illustrated Guide to the Apple IIe, 1984 (ISBN 0-13-514688-7)
- Ken Uston's Illustrated Guide to the Commodore 64, 1984 (ISBN 0-13-514621-6)
- Ken Uston's Illustrated Guide to the Compaq, 1984 (ISBN 0-13-514696-8)
- Ken Uston's Illustrated Guide to the IBM PC, 1984 (ISBN 0-13-514704-2)
- Ken Uston's Illustrated Guide to the Kaypro, 1984 (ISBN 0-13-514795-6)
- Ken Uston's Illustrated Guide to the Macintosh, 1984 (ISBN 0-13-514829-4)
- Ken Uston's Illustrated Guide to Today's Most Popular Computers, 1984 (ISBN 0-317-13333-0)
- Ken Uston's Illustrated Guide to the IBM PCjr, 1985 (ISBN 0-13-514720-4)
