= TV Boy =

Dedicated console and clone of the Atari 2600

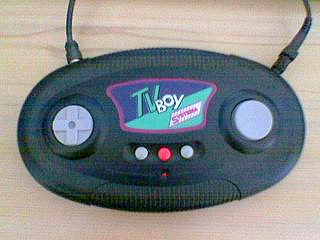
- TV Boy with power and TV leads attached
- Manufacturer: Akor
- Type: Home video game console
- Generation: Second generation
- Released: 1992
- CPU: MOS 6507 @ 1.19 MHz
- Memory: 128 bytes
- Storage: 512KB ROM with 127 games
- Display: 160x200, 128 Colors
- Controller input: Combination joystick/paddle controller
- Related: Atari 2600

The TV Boy, and its successors TV Boy II, Super TV Boy and TV Boy 3, are handheld TV games sold by many different companies, including Systema, Akor, and NICS, based upon an unlicensed clone of Atari 2600 hardware. They were released around 1992 and three years later, an improved version of the TV Boy 2, the Super TV Boy, was also made by Akor. TV Boy 3 was released in the style of a PlayStation controller and were widely available across Europe. In the UK, they were most visibly available through Argos.

Users can play any one of 127 built-in games. In the UK, they were marketed with 126 games included, while the Super TV Boy has 127.

== Hardware ==
Resembling a large handheld pad, the systems plug into a TV and operate on either three or four AA batteries depending on model or a 6V power supply (3.5mm plug, tip positive). The TV Boy, TV Boy 2 and Super TV boy connect via the RF television antenna input whereas the TV Boy 3 (and some TV Boy II models) have a composite video and audio line out via RCA and SCART plug.

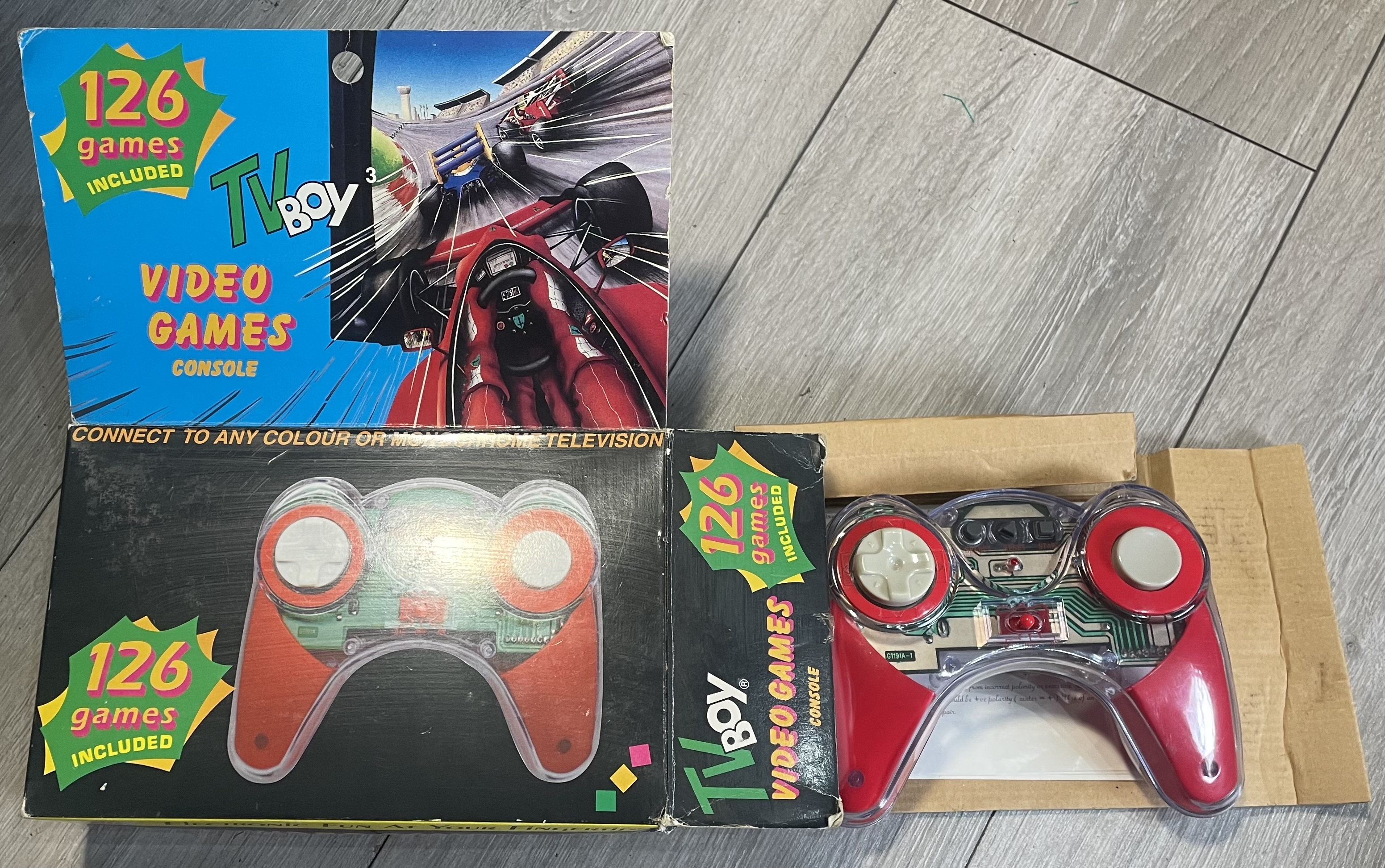
TV Boy 3

A key difference between a TV Boy and later models is that the former has two 9-pin Atari-type joystick connectors for the optional use of external joysticks. This is true for the Systema and NICS TV Boys, but not for the Akor version, which does not have such external ports at all. As the TV Boy II, Super and TV Boy 3 have no capacity for external joysticks, only a single player may play using a built-in pad. Some versions of the TV Boy, but not all, have a jumper labeled NTSC/PAL on its motherboard. There is no cartridge slot for additional games.

== Games ==
The system contains a single 512KB ROM, housing 128 programs. One is the program that enables the others to be selected so only 127 games are included. None of them use any sort of paged ROM scheme.

All 127 are original Atari 2600 games by companies such as Atari, Activision, and Mattel, hacked to remove copyright notices and other assets demonstrating ownership. The colored bars to the left of the A in the Activision logo remain in some games but the company name is excised. False and ambiguous names – such as Mad Kong (Donkey Kong) and The Flying Man (Superman) – are printed on the packing box and in the instruction manual.

For the UK versions, one game originally included with the TV Boy was removed from later models: game #91: Protection (Defender). No replacement game takes its place (it was left non-operational, listing it as 'Factory Test Game' on the packaging) making them 126-game handheld consoles. This space was filled in the Super TV Boy with Winter Adventure (Mountain Man). Also, three games were exchanged in the UK: Maze Town (Maze Craze) with Full Attack, Football (Pele's Soccer) with Besieged (Z-Tack), and Duel (Outlaw) with Laser Attack (Laser Blast).

Some of the games slightly alter the graphics of the originals. All play with altered colors — for example, Pitfall! (retitled as Forest Walk) is set in a blue forest — because the game ROMs are NTSC versions played on a PAL console.

=== List of included games ===
The following is a complete list of the Atari 2600 games modified for inclusion in the TV Boy, according to the game number on that device, with the original game name listed beside:

1. Desert Strike – Chopper Command (Activision) – 1982 (001)
2. River Raid – River Raid (Activision) – 1982 (002)
3. Pacmania – Pac-Man (Atari) – 1981 (003)
4. Wolf Fight – Pooyan (Konami) – 1983 (004)
5. Star Force – Earth Dies Screaming (20th Century Fox) – 1983 (005)
6. Asteroid – Mission 3000 A.D. (Puzzy/Bit) – previously PAL only – 1983 (006)
7. Space 2010 – Demon Attack (Imagic) – 1982 (007)
8. Invasion – Space Invaders (Atari) – Original release 1978 ported in 1980 (008)
9. Motocross – Motocross (Suntek) – Year unknown (009)
10. The Frogs – Frogs and Flies (M Network) – 1982 (010)
11. Helicopter Squad – Time Warp (Funvision) – 1982 (011)
12. The Birds – Curtiss (Suntek) – Year unknown (012)
13. The Jungle – Mr. Postman (Puzzy/Bit) – 1983 (013)
14. Submarine – Katastrophen-Einsatz – (Quelle) the German version of M*A*S*H (014)
15. Pacmania (2) – Jawbreaker (Tigervision) – 1982 (015)
16. River Crossing – Frogger (Parker Bros.) – 1983 (016)
17. Tank Battle – Thunderground (Sega) – 1983 (017)
18. Fire! – Fire Fighter (Imagic) – 1982 (018)
19. Forest Walk – Pitfall! (Activision) – 1982 (019)
20. The Sharks – Seaquest (Activision) – 1983 (020)
21. Pin Ball – Video Pinball (Atari) – 1980 (021)
22. Sea Hunter – Sub-Scan (Sega) – 1983 (022)
23. Dragon Treasure – Dragonfire (Imagic) – 1982 (023)
24. The Dentist – Plaque Attack (Activision) – 1983 (024)
25. Mad Kong – Donkey Kong (Coleco) – 1982 (025)
26. The Gardener – Gopher (US Games) – does not appear on the TV Boy – 1982 (026)
27. Forest Battle – Nuts (Technovision) – previously PAL only – 1983 (027)
28. Space Conquest – Flash Gordon (20th Century Fox) – 1983 (028)
29. F1 Race – Enduro (Activision) – 1983 (029)
30. Treasure – Criminal Pursuit (ZiMAG/Vidco/Emag) – Year unknown (030)
31. Symbols – I.Q. Memory Teaser (Suntek) – 1983 (031)
32. The Hen House – Farmyard Fun (Suntek) – previously PAL only – Year unknown (032)
33. Rescue – Zoo Fun (Suntek) – 1983 (033)
34. Duck Pass – Challenge (Funvision) – 1980 (034)
35. Thief! – Keystone Kapers (Activision) – 1983 (035)
36. Bowling – Bowling (Atari) – 1979 (036)
37. Brick Wall – Circus Atari (Atari) – 1980 (037)
38. Rodeo – Stampede (Activision) – 1981 (038)
39. Space Battle – M.A.D. (US Games) – 1982 (039)
40. Parachute – Parachute (Suntek) – 1983 (040)
41. Monsters – Berzerk (Atari) – 1982 (041)
42. Lost Ships – Worm War I (Sirius-Fox) – 1982 (042)
43. The Maze – Dodge 'Em (Atari) – 1980 (043)
44. Around The World – Bobby Is Going Home (Puzzy/Bit) – previously PAL only – 1983 (044)
45. The Ladder – Master Builder (Spectravision) – 1983 (045)
46. Rambler – Walker (A.K.A. Clown Down Town) (Suntek) – 1983 {046}
47. Space Defence – UFO Patrol (Suntek) – 1983 (047)
48. Evil Fighter – Immies & Aggies (A.K.A. Spectracube Invasion) (ZiMAG/Vidco/Emag) – 1983 (048)
49. Flying saucers – Great Escape (Bomb) – 1983 (049)
50. Town Attack – Z-Tack (Bomb) – 1983 (050)
51. Fire Dragon – Dragon Defender (Suntek) – 1983 (051)
52. Chinese Plates – Dancing Plate (Puzzy/Bit) – 1983 (052)
53. Rivercross – Frostbite (Activision) – 1983 (053)
54. Base Defenses – Commando Raid (U.S. Games) – 1982 (054)
55. Wolf! – Oink! (Activision) – 1983 (055)
56. The Mouse – Snail Against Squirrel (Puzzy/Bit) – previously PAL only – 1983 (056)
57. Maze Town – King Kong (Tigervision) – 1982 (057)
58. Ice Polo – Ice Hockey (Activision) – 1981 (058)
59. Tennis – Tennis (Activision) – 1981 (059)
60. Sea War – Sea Monster (Puzzy/Bit) – 1982 (060)
61. Volley Ball – Realsports Volleyball (Atari) – 1982 (061)
62. Evil Attack – Spider Fighter (Activision) – 1983 (062)
63. Rocket – Missile Control (Video Gems) (Atari) – previously PAL only – 1983 (063)
64. Besieged – Wall-Defender (Bomb) – does not appear on the TV Boy – 1983 (064)
65. The Spider – Amidar (Parker Bros.) – 1982 (065)
66. Fly in the Sky – Barnstorming (Activision) – 1982 (066)
67. Car Race – Grand Prix (Activision) – 1982 (067)
68. The Flying Man – Superman (Atari) – 1979 (068)
69. Robot Attack – Space Robot (Dimax) – previously PAL only – 1983 (069)
70. Robot City – Lock 'n' Chase (M Network) – 1982 (070)
71. The Ghosts – Venture (Coleco) – 1982 (071)
72. Space Ship – Cosmic Ark (Imagic) – 1982 (072)
73. Tank Action – Strategy X (Konami) – 1983 (073)
74. Laser Ship – Cross Force (Spectravision) – 1982 (074)
75. One Against all – Planet Patrol (Spectravision) – 1982 (075)
76. Golf – Golf (Atari) – 1980 (076)
77. Robot Strike – Star Wars: The Empire Strikes Back (Parker Bros.) – 1982 (077)
78. Street Battle – Dark Cavern (M Network) – 1982 (078)
79. Tunnel – Pharaoh's Curse (TechnoVision) – 1983 (079)
80. Operation Thunderstorm – Turmoil (20th Century Fox) – 1982 (080)
81. Sky Squadron – Tac-Scan (Sega) – 1983 (081)
82. Spiderman – Spider-Man (Parker Bros.) – 1982 (082)
83. Maze Craze – Bank Heist (20th Century Fox) – 1983 (083)
84. Earth 2010 – Space Cavern (Apollo) – 1981 (084)
85. The Shield – SpaceMaster X-7 (20th Century Fox) – 1983 (085) (?)
86. Sea Warp – Atlantis (Imagic) – 1982 (086)
87. Holy Ghost – Open, Sesame! (Puzzy/Bit) – 1982 (087)
88. Funfair Rifle Range – Carnival (Coleco) – 1982 (088)
89. Laser Tank – Threshold (Tigervision) – 1982 (089)
90. Luke and the Monsters – Fast Eddie (20th Century Fox) – graphics altered from original – 1982 (090)
91. Protection – Defender (Atari) – 1981 (091)
92. Tic-Tac-Toe – 3-D Tic-Tac-Toe (Atari) – 1980 (092)
93. UFO Ship – Assault (Bomb) – 1983 (093)
94. Birds of Prey – Condor Attack (Ultravision) – 1982 (094)
95. Deep-Sea Fishing – Name This Game (US Games) – 1982 (095)
96. Spider King – Pac-Kong (Funvision) – previously PAL only (096)
97. The Crabs – Crackpots (Activision) – 1983 (097)
98. Billiard – Trick Shot (Imagic) – 1982 (098)
99. Moon Driver – Gas Hog (Spectravision) – 1983 (099)
100. Tank Battle in The Streets – Phantom Tank (Puzzy/Bit) – 1982 (100)
101. Squash – Racquetball (Apollo) – 1981 (101)
102. Tunnel Battle – Laser Gates (Imagic) – 1983 (102)
103. Space Exploration – Cosmic Creeps (Telesys) – 1982 (103)
104. King Building – Robin Hood or Save Our Ship (Technovision) – previously PAL only – 1983 (104)
105. Galaxy 2 – Challenge of NEXAR (Spectravision) – 1982 (105)
106. Tom's Adventure – Panda Chase (Home Vision) – 1983 (106)
107. Moto Kid – Mega Force (20th Century Fox) – 1982 (107)
108. Karate – Karate (Ultravision) – 1982 (108)
109. Sky Destroyer – Missile Command (Atari) – 1981 (109)
110. Fighter Pilot – Air Raiders (M Network) – 1982 (110)
111. Pacific War – Seahawk (Sancho / Tang's Electronic Co.) – 1982 (111)
112. Robot Alert! – Hey! Stop! (Suntek) (112)
113. The Vulture – Tuby Bird (Suntek) (113)
114. Submarine Fishing – Bi! Bi! (Rainbow Vision) (114)
115. River Fishing – Fishing Derby (Activision) – 1980 (115)
116. Traffic – Freeway (Activision) – 1981 (116)
117. UFO Attack – Space Jockey (U.S. Games) – 1982 (117)
118. Game of Draughts – Checkers (Activision) – 1980 (118)
119. Duel – Outlaw (Atari) – 1978 (119)
120. Ottello – Othello (Atari) – 1980 (120)
121. Sidereal attack – Cosmic Swarm (CommaVid) – 1982 (121)
122. Ski – Skiing (Activision) – 1980 (122)
123. Invaders – Astro War (Dimax) – previously PAL only – Year unknown (123)
124. The Trap – Gangster Alley (Spectravision) – 1982 (124)
125. Elevator – Infiltrate (Apollo) – 1981 (125)
126. Hamburger – Fast Food (Telesys) – 1982 (126)
127. Invader – Megamania (Activision) – 1982 (127)
