= Bloede =

Bloede could be:

- Karl August Blöede (14 August 1773-28 August 1820; grandfather of Gertrude and Victor G. Blöede, I), scholar, educator, mineralogist & chemist, and author. Name sake of Blödite
- Marie Blöede (writer) (1821-1870; daughter-in-law of Karl August)
- Gertrude Blöede (poet) (1845-1905; daughter of Marie)
- Victor Gustav Blöede, I. (chemist) (1849-1937; son of Marie)
- Victor Gustav Blöede, III. (advertising) (1920-1999; grandson of the chemist Victor)
- Bloede's Dam, named after the chemist
