= Home Vision =

Belgian video game brand

Home Vision was a Belgian brand used by the company VDI for the distribution of Atari 2600 video games created by the Taiwan-based company Gem International Corporation. Several games with the Home Vision brand were released later by other companies like ITT Family Games (from Germany) or Rainbow Vision (from Taiwan.) VDI also manufactured its own video game system and a personal computer and released them with the Home Vision label.

== Game library ==
This is an incomplete list of games released by Home Vision:

- Asteroid Fire (also released by Bomb as Great Escape)
- Base Attack (also released by Bomb as Z-Tack)
- Chase Robber
- Col 'N' (also known variously as Alien's Return, Go Go Home, E.T. Go Home, and more)
- Cosmic War (also released by Bit Corp. as Space Tunnel)
- Dragon Power
- Frisco
- IQ-180
- Lilly Adventure (similar to Bobby Is Going Home by Bit Corp.)
- Magic Carpet
- Panda Chase
- Parachute
- Plate Mania (also released by Bit Corp. as Dancing Plate)
- Racing Car
- Robot Fight (also released by Dimax)
- Sky Alien (also released by Bomb as Assault)
- Tanks War (as released by Bit Corp. as Phantom Tank)
- Teddy Apple (also released by Bit Corp. as Open Sesame)
- Topy
- Treasure Discovery
- Tennis (hacked version of Activision's Tennis)
- Wall Break (also released by Bomb as Wall-Defender)
- War 2000 (also released by Dimax as Astrowar)
