= Victor Gustav Bloede =

Victor Gustav Bloede may refer to:

- Victor Gustav Bloede (chemist) (1849–1937), German-American chemist, manufacturer and businessman
- Victor Gustav Bloede (advertising) (1920–1999), American advertising executive
