= Lockjaw =

Lockjaw can refer to:

== Medical conditions and diseases ==
- Trismus, a pathological condition in which the mouth is held shut by sustained spasm of the masseter (jaw) muscle, often observed in cases of tetanus
- Tetanus, an infectious disease of the central nervous system
- Temporomandibular joint dysfunction or TMD, often erroneously called TMJ

== Music ==
- Eddie "Lockjaw" Davis, American jazz saxophonist
- Lockjaw (band), an English punk band from the 1970s
- Lockjaw (album), a 1995 album by Dance Hall Crashers
- Lockjaw (EP), a 2013 EP by Flume and Chet Faker
- "Lockjaw" (song), a 2016 song by American hip hop artist French Montana and Kodak Black
- "Lockjaw", a track which features American rapper Trunks and appears on the King Geedorah album Take Me to Your Leader
- "Lockjaw", a track from the album Mack Daddy by Sir Mix-a-Lot

== Other uses ==
- Lockjaw (character), a character from Marvel Comics' Inhumans
- Locust Valley Lockjaw, an upper-class American accent
- Steven J. Lockjaw, a character from One Battle After Another
- Lochjaw, a 1982 video game by Games by Apollo later renamed to Shark Attack
