= Hauptfriedhof Mainz =

Cemetery in Mainz, Germany

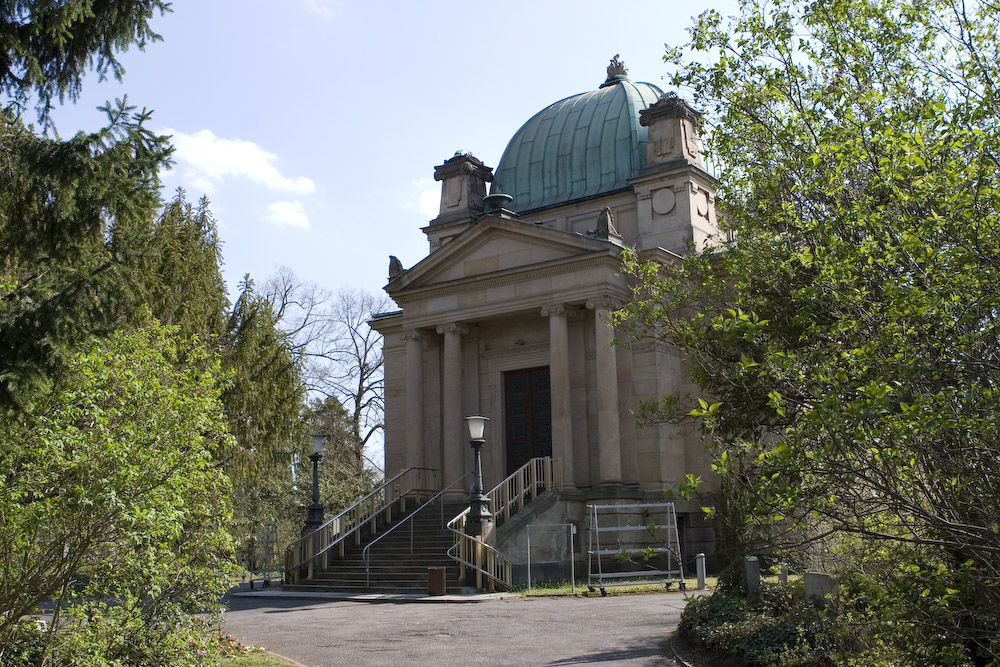
- Crematory
- Interactive map of Hauptfriedhof Mainz

Details
- Established: 1803; 223 years ago
- Location: Mainz
- Country: Germany
- Coordinates: 49°59′42″N 8°15′00″E
- Type: Public
- Size: 22 ha (54 acres)

The Hauptfriedhof is the main cemetery of Mainz, the capital of Rhineland-Palatinate, Germany. It was established in 1803 when Mainz was under French administration. It became the model for the Cimetière du Père-Lachaise in Paris. It is the burial place of prominent persons, also the Deutscher Ehrenhof honorary graves. The cemetery is a cultural heritage site and prominent urban green space.

== History ==
When Mainz was under French administration, cemeteries became rare due to the closing of church institutions. A new Christian cemetery was established in 1803 when Jeanbon St. André was the French préfet of the department of Mont-Tonnerre (Donnersberg).

Initiated by the mayor, Franz Konrad Macké, it was placed in the Zahlbach valley on former monastery grounds in 1803. It had been a burial site in Roman times. Later, some bishops of Mainz were buried there including Aureus of Mainz. The cemetery became the model for the Cimetière du Père-Lachaise in Paris.

The Hauptfriedhof was first a square ground of about eleven morgen that was expanded several times. It has now an area of 22 hektar, roughly in 75 "fields" in the central part, 14 in the urn grove across Saarstraße. The paths form a grid, with the main paths lined by trees. The cemetery contains old trees and other plants, and is regarded as quality urban green space of Mainz.

== Monuments ==
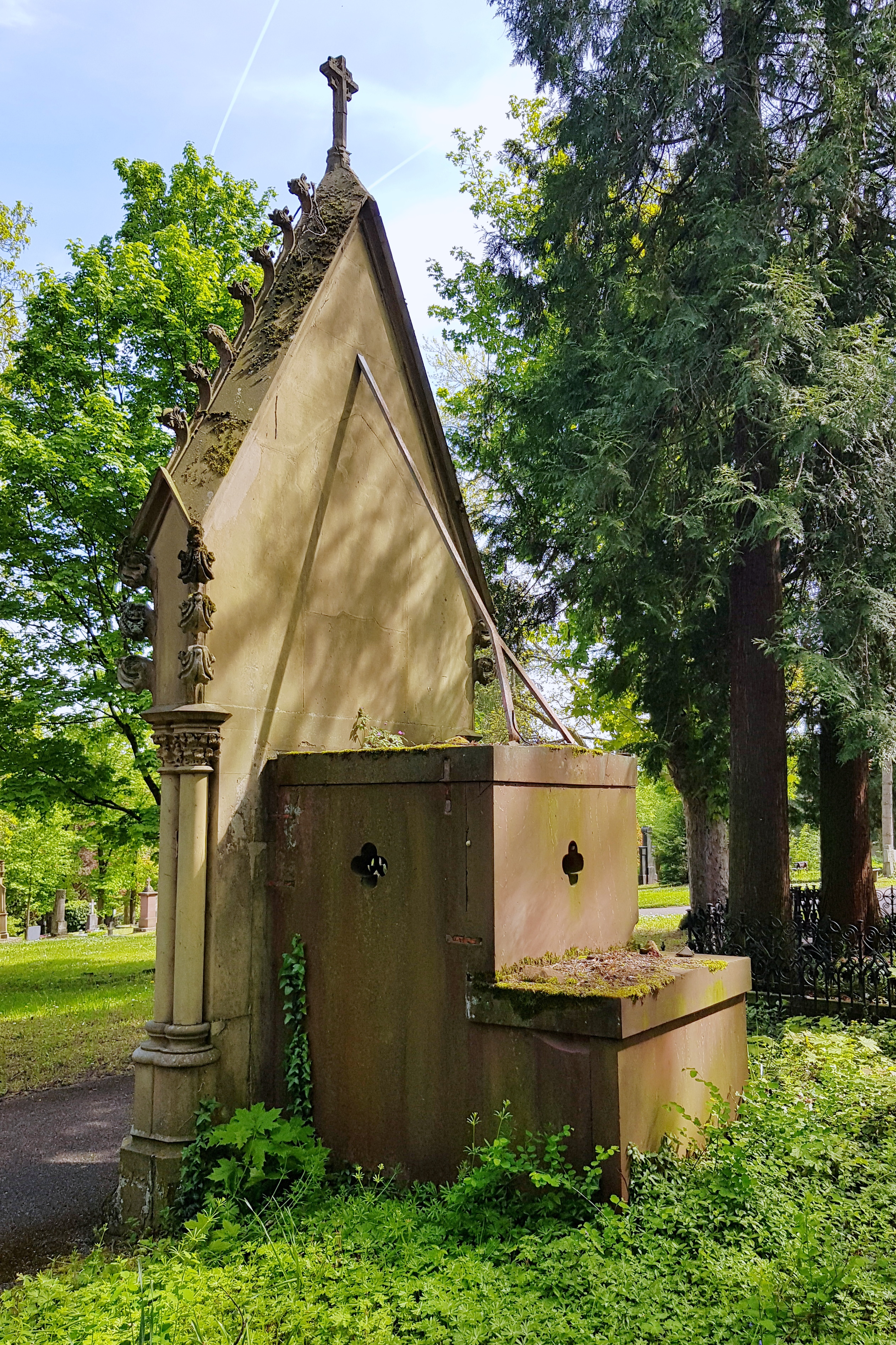
Portal grave near the old crematory

The Hauptfriedhof contains historic graves and monuments, interesting for historians and art historians. There are graves for single people, families, and also groups, including victims of wars, French soldiers, and Deutscher Ehrenhof honorary graves. The cemetery features two Gruftenstraßen (grave roads) with high monuments of important Mainzer families. The oldest gravestone dates to 1805. 230 gravestones and monuments are listed historic monuments.

=== Graves of notable people ===
The Hauptfriedhof holds the graves of important Main personalities: scientists, industrialists, musicians, writers, politicians and people of the Mainz carnival.

Burials include:

- Bernhard Adelung (1876–1943), politician (SPD), mayor of Mainz and minister-president of Volksstaat Hesse
- Jeanbon St. André (1749–1813), French préfet
- Peter Cornelius (1824–1874), composer
- Eduard David (1863–1930), jurist
- Eduard Duller (1809–1853), poet, writer, preacher
- Jockel Fuchs (1919–2002), mayor 1965 to 1987
- Paul Haenlein (1835–1905), engineer
- Ida Hahn-Hahn (1805–1880), writer, poet, founder of an order
- Adam Henkell (1801–1866), sekt producer (Henkell & Co.)
- Karl Holzamer (1906–2007), philosoph, founding Intendant of ZDF
- Friedrich Kellner (1885–1970), historian
- Eduard Kreyßig (1830–1897), building master for the city
- Christian Adalbert Kupferberg (1824–1876), merchant, founder of Kupferberg-Sektkellerei
- Joseph Laské (1816–1865), building master for cathedral and city
- Adam Franz Lennig (1803–1866), theologian at the Main Cathedral, Cathedral dean from 1852
- Ludwig Lindenschmit der Ältere (1809–1893), bedeutender Prähistoriker. Gründer des heutigen Römisch-Germanischen Zentralmuseums (RGZM)
- Karl von Loehr (1875–1958), deutscher Architekt-->
- Franz Konrad Macké (1756–1844), Mainz Maire 1793 and 1800–14, mayor 1831–34
- Franz Schott (1811–1874), mayor 1865 to 1871, music publisher
- Fritz Straßmann (1902–1980), chemist, one of the pioneers of nuclear fission
- Philipp Veit (1793–1877), painter
- Carl Weiser (1811–1865), co-founder of Mainzer Carneval-Verein, first Branddirektor
- Kathinka Zitz-Halein (1801–1877), writer

== Gallery ==
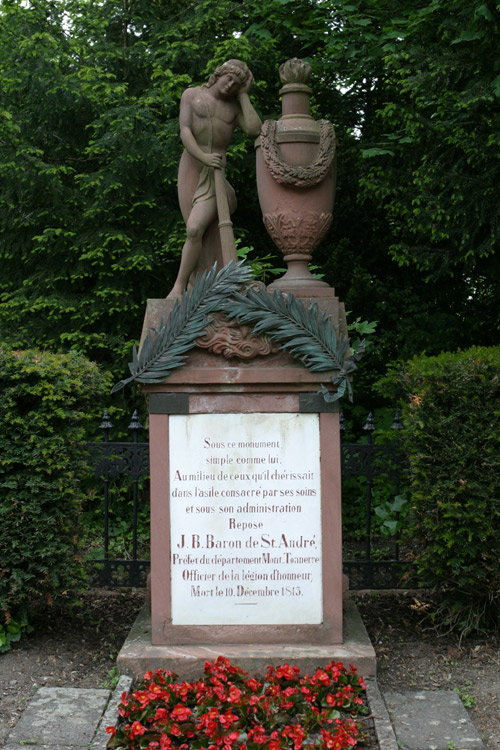
Jeanbon St. André

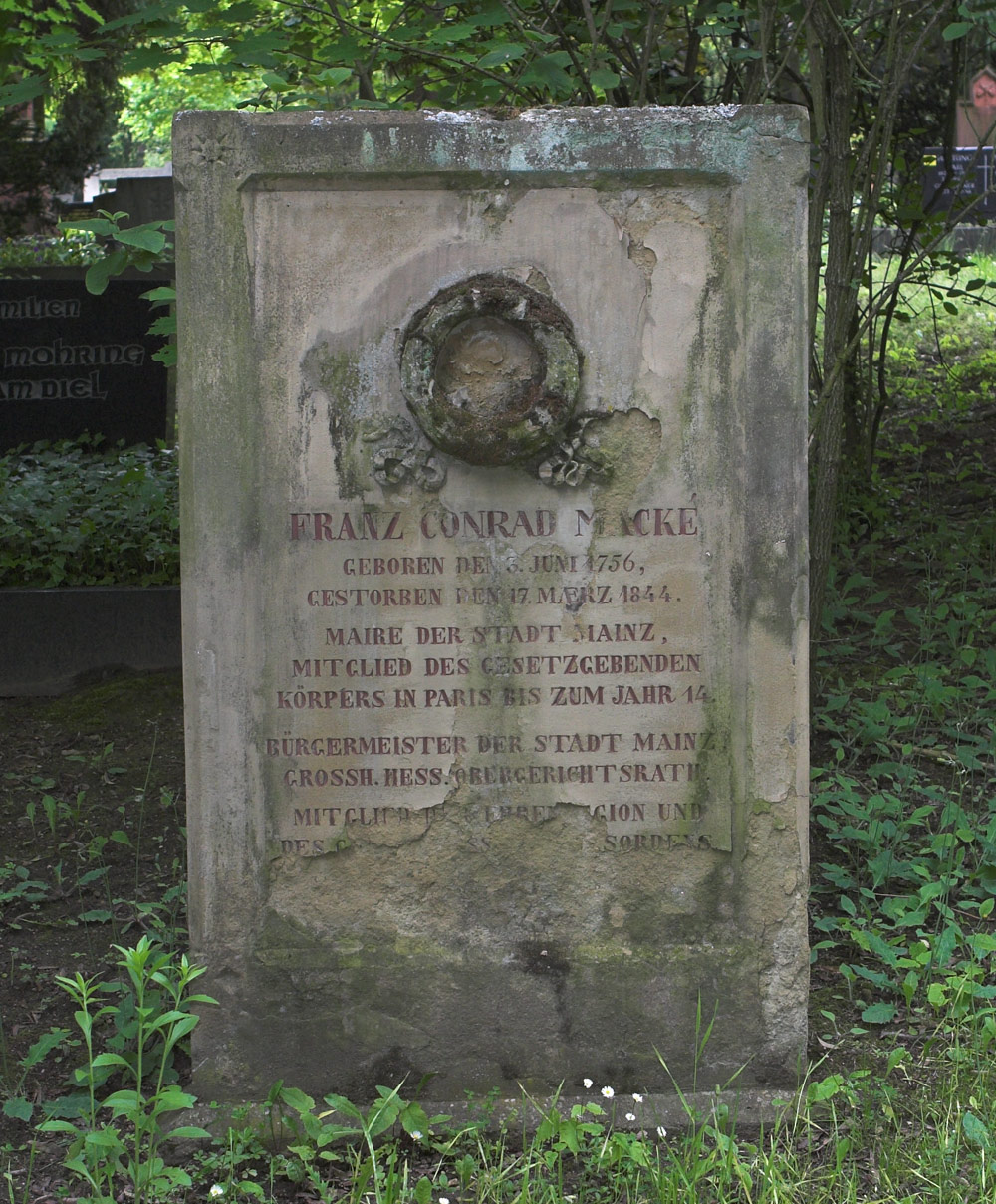
Franz Conrad Macké

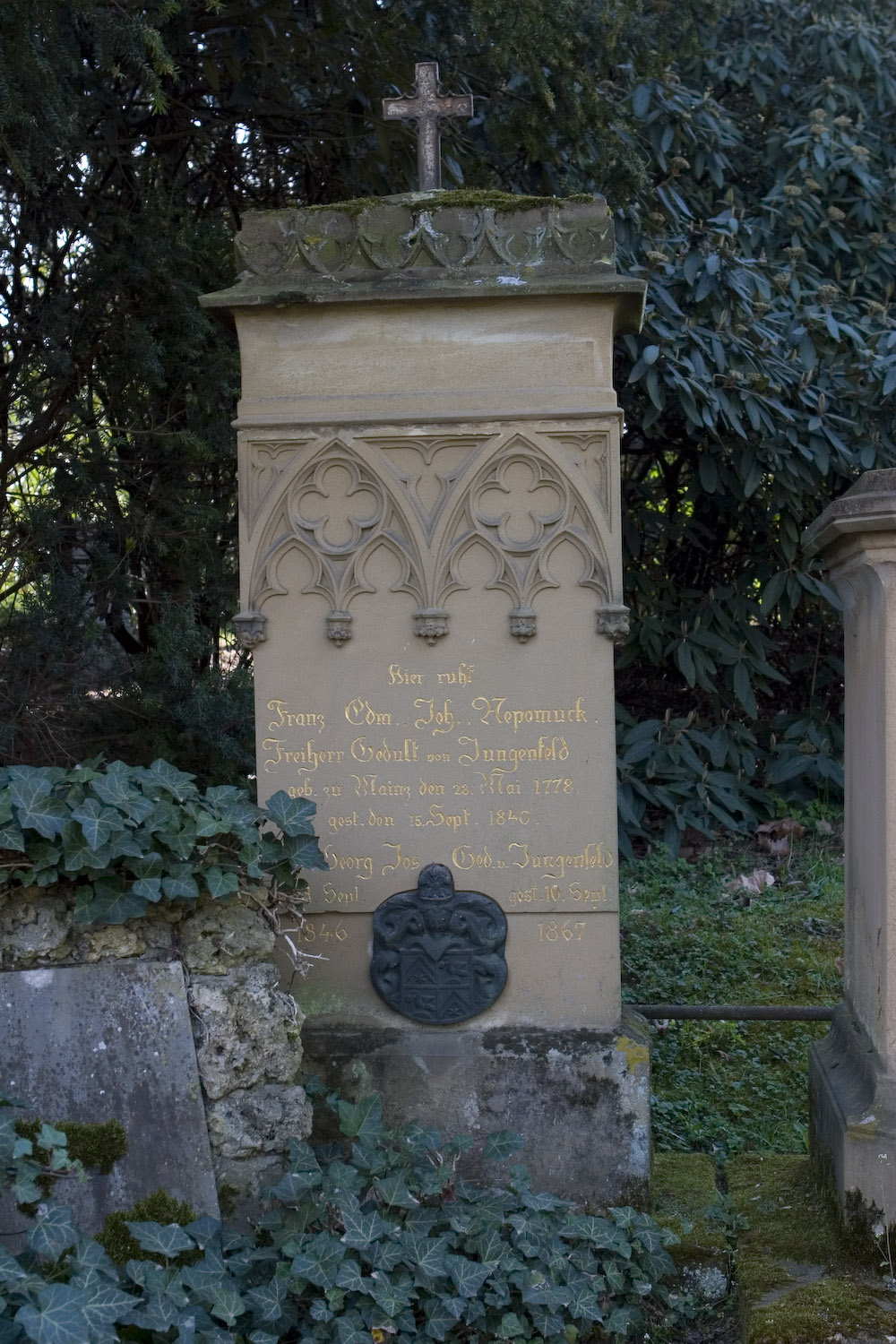
Franz Freiherr Gedult von Jungenfeld

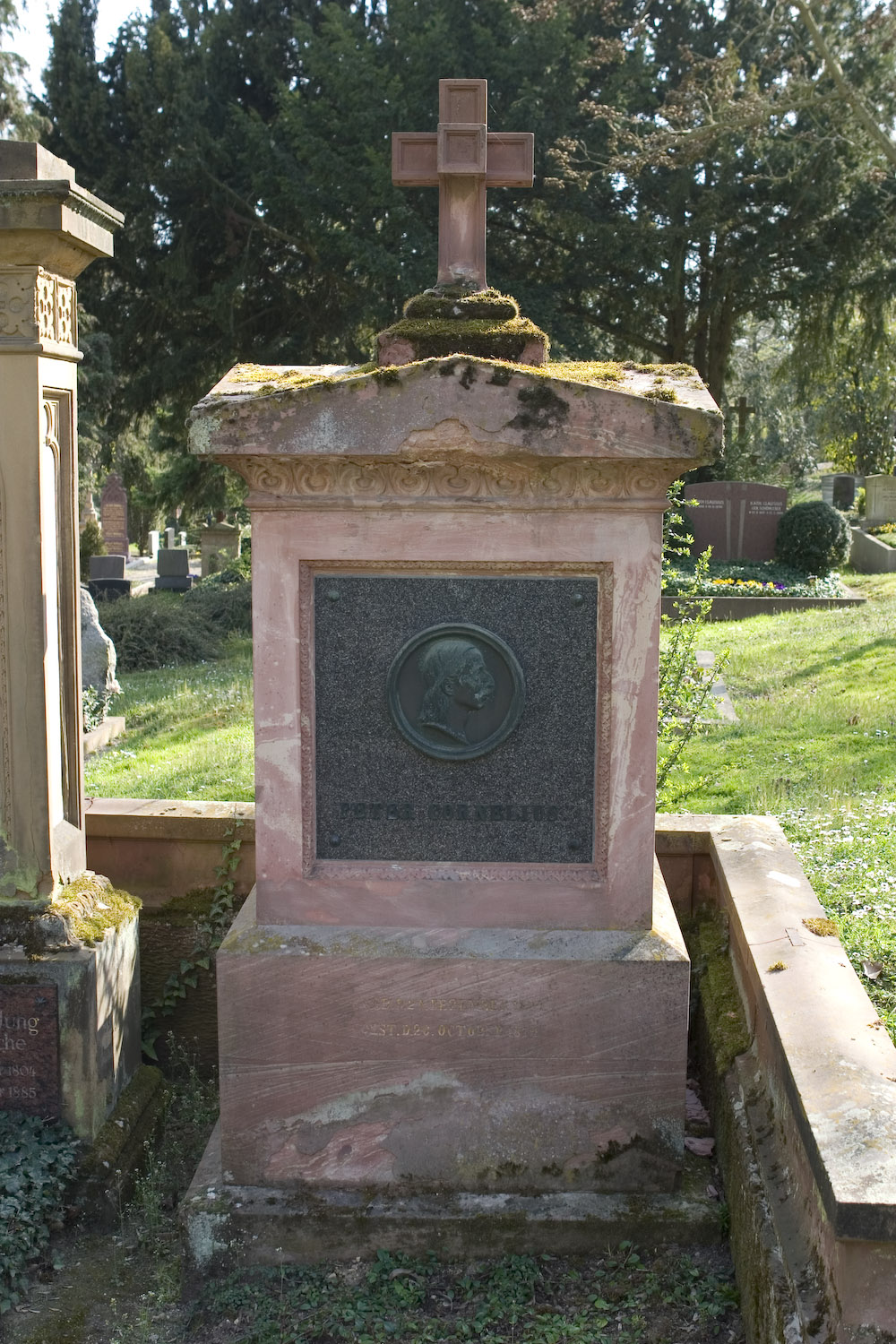
Peter Cornelius

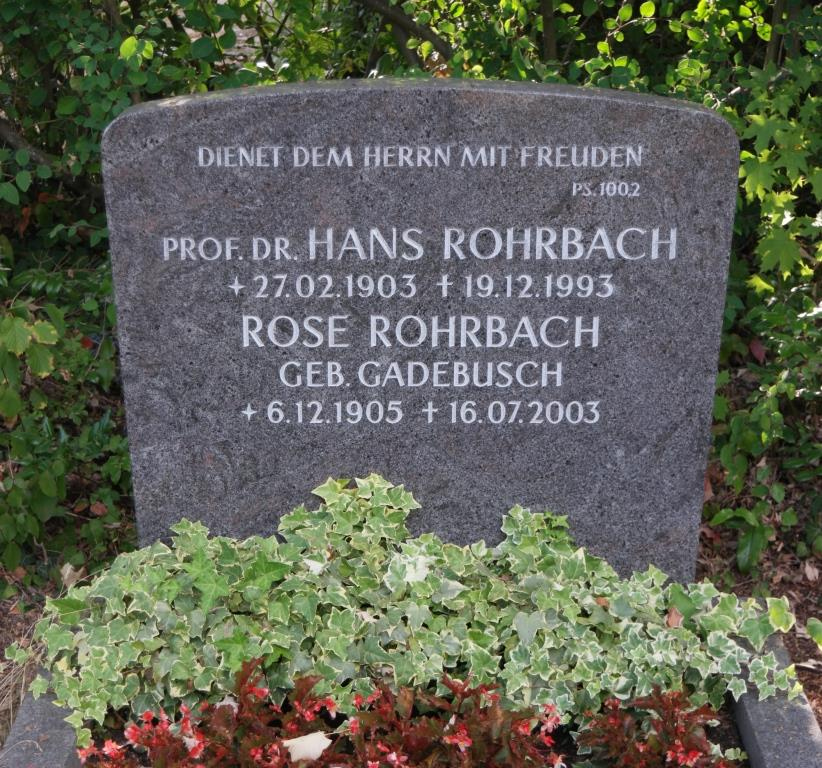
Hans Rohrbach
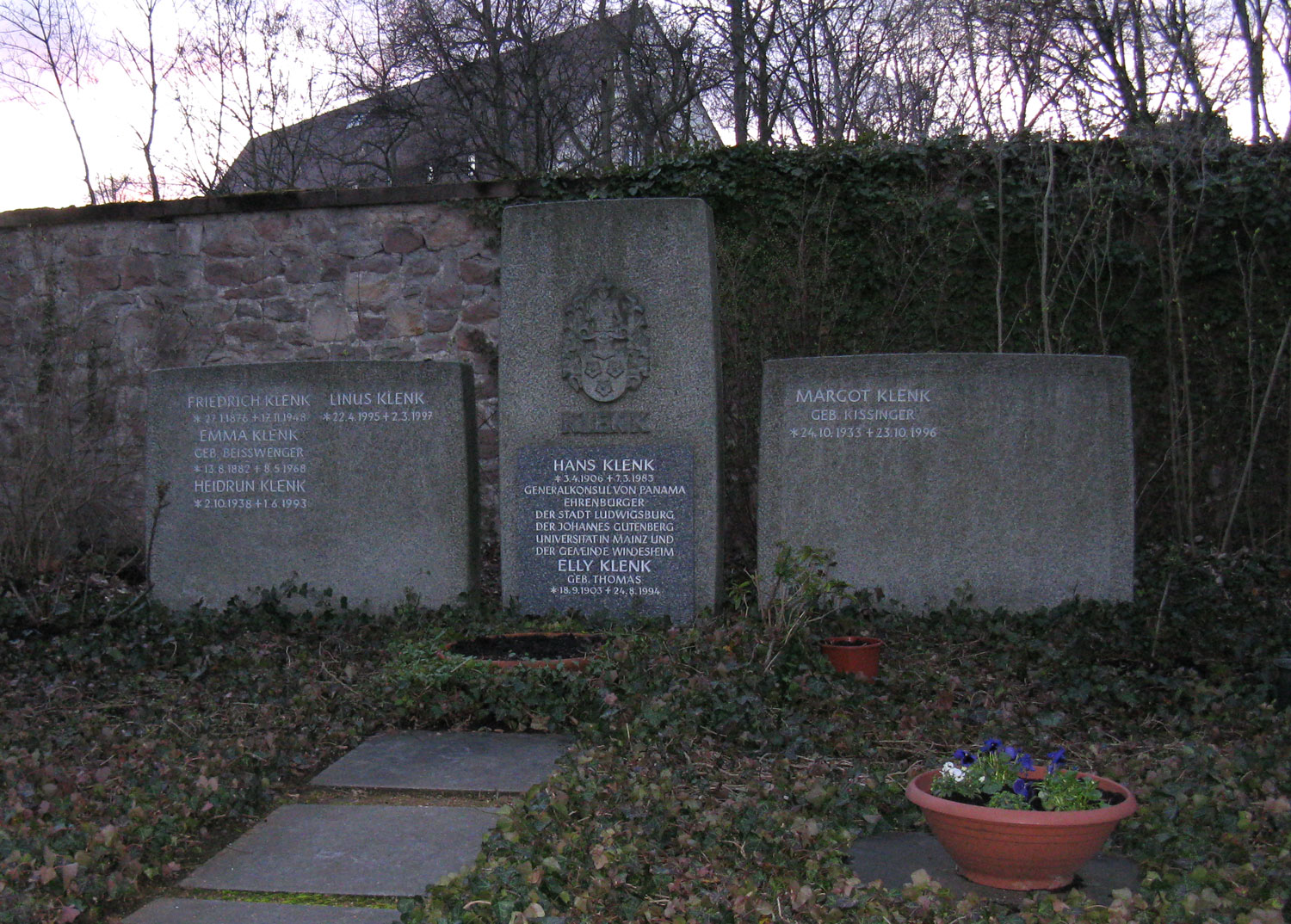
Hans Klenk

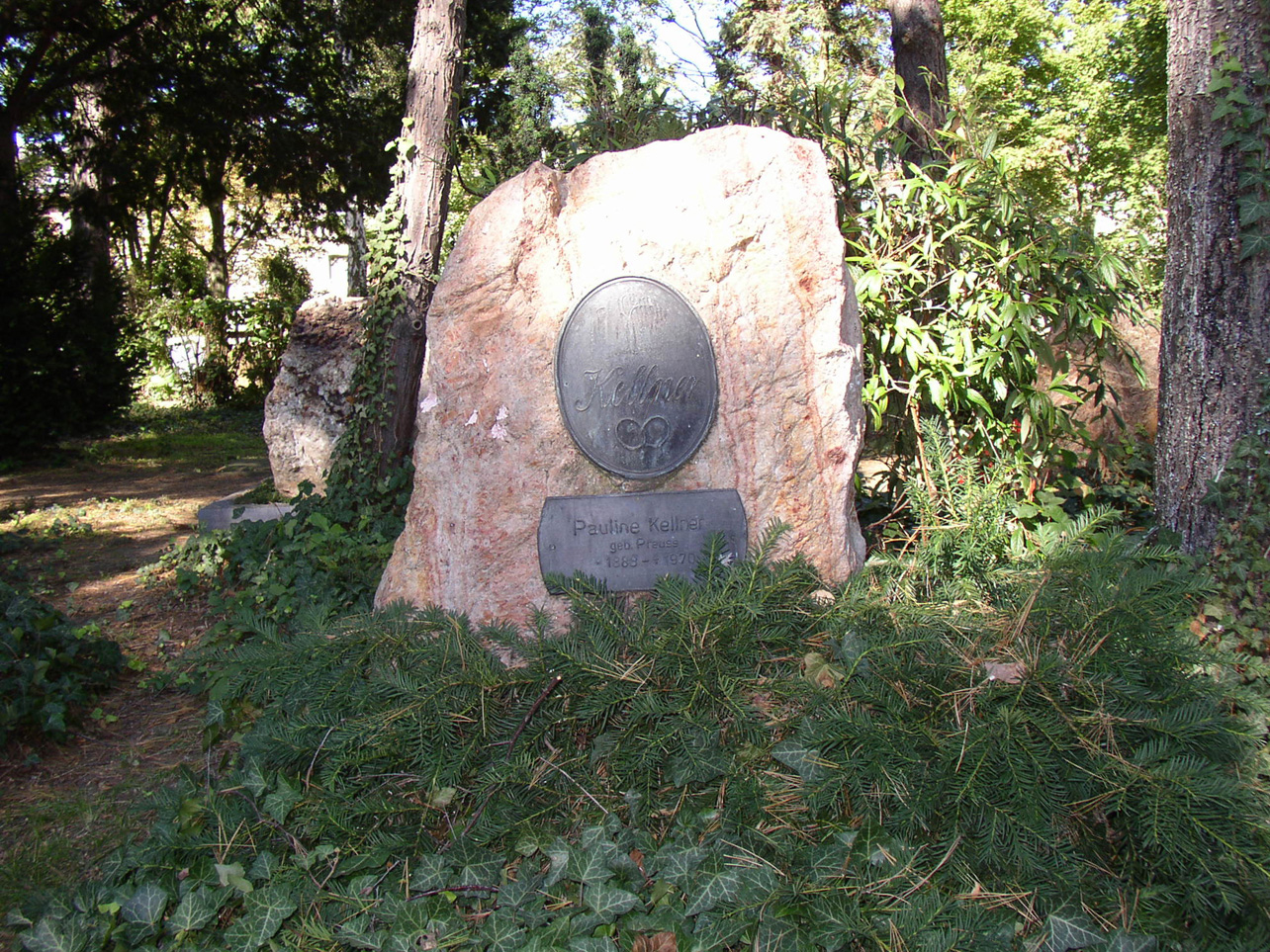
Friedrich Kellner

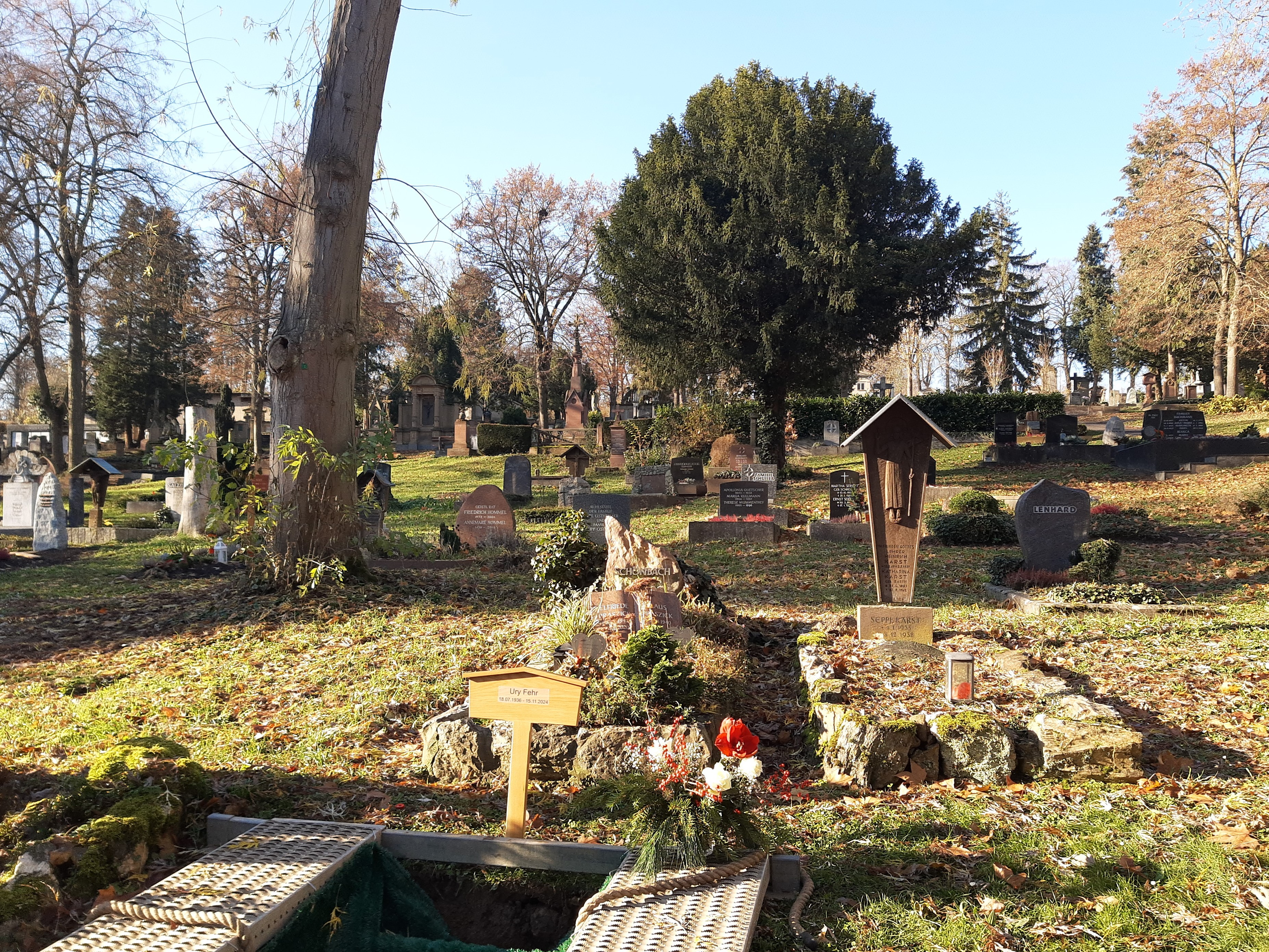
Central area

== Awards ==
Hauptfriedhof Mainz was included in the list of the most important cemeteries in Europa by the European Association of Significant Cemeteries in 2006. The cemetery placed third in a 2012 poll of the most beautiful cemeteries in Germany, after the Ohlsdorf Cemetery in Hamburg and the Waldfriedhof in Munich.
