= Racquetball (video game) =

1982 video game

- Developer: Games by Apollo
- Publisher: Games by Apollo
- Designer: Ed Salvo
- Composer: Byron Parks
- Platform: Atari 2600
- Release: NA: June 1982; PAL: c. January 1983
- Genre: Sports (Racquetball)
- Modes: Single-player, multiplayer

Racquetball is 1982 sports video game created by Ed Salvo for the Atari 2600 as a simulation of the sport of racquetball. It was published by Games by Apollo with music composed by sound engineer Byron Parks. One or two players complete to keep a ball in play inside an indoor court where the ball is free to move in three dimension and bounce off walls and ceilings. The ball casts shadows which are used to help players understand the game's three dimensional perspective. Contemporary critics were highly critical of the game, considering it to be too difficult to complete volleys and finding the perspective and shadows to be confusing and disorientating.

== Gameplay ==
Each game begins with a brief animation of two players entering the court and shaking hands before engaging in a game of racquetball. Players can move both left and right and up and down the court to attempt to hit the ball. The action button is used to serve the ball but only body contact is necessary to keep a volley going. The ball moves around in three-dimensional space and will bounce off of the walls and ceiling of the court. Shadows appear on the walls, ceilings and floors that help players orient the exact position of the ball in 3D space. Players can face off both against either and against a computer opponent.

== Development ==
Racquetball was developed for Games by Apollo by Ed Salvo, who had previously developed Skeet Shoot and Spacechase. Salvo became Apollo's first developer after following up on a newspaper ad placed in a local paper. According to Salvo, the idea for Racquetball came from Pat Roper, Apollo's CEO, and the game was completed in about four weeks. The opening music and sound effects for the game where created by sound engineer Byron Parks.

Fellow Apollo programmer Ernie Runyan recalls Salvo putting a lot of time into Racquetball figuring out the possible trajectories for the ball. In retropect, Salvo said he regrets putting so many shadows in the game.

== Reception ==
British magazine TV Gamer considered Racquetball to be "a lot of fun to play" though not entirely faithful to the sport. The Video Game Update complimented the graphics and found the animation at the start of each game to be "cute" though annoying after enough playthroughs. They called the play action "fast" but "a bit confusing", and considered it to be a better experience with two players as the computer opponent "has a nasty habit of putting the ball in the most unreachable corners."

Videogaming Illustrated considered Racquetball to be an "ambitious cartridge" but ultimately dragged down by the unrealistic ball physics and an inability to understand the balls location relative to the player. They did not recommend it and considered previous Apollo games to be better alternatives. Perry Greenberg writing for Video Games called it "a mess" and the court something "out of a high school geometry textbook." He considered it impossible to tell where the ball was, which player was which, or whose turn it was. JoyStik: How to Win at Home Video Games claimed "the problem with Apollo's 'three-dimensional Racquetball' is that it isn't completely 3-D." For them, the perspective and the shadow ball on the court made it too difficult to hit the ball. Head editor of The Logical Gamer, Alan R. Bechtold, said "whatever possessed the designer of the game to employ a white shadow that the player must follow is beyond me." Bechtold's co-reviewer Mike Wilson agreed, saying the game would be simple to play "if you weren't forced to play the game in what looks like a hall of mirrors with those all-important shadows on the walls, ceiling, and floor."
