= Skeet Shoot =

1981 Atari video game

- Developer: Games by Apollo
- Publisher: Games by Apollo
- Designer: Ed Salvo
- Platform: Atari 2600
- Release: December 1981
- Genre: Sports
- Modes: Single-player, multiplayer

Skeet Shoot is a skeet shooting video game for the Atari 2600 and the first game released by Games by Apollo in December 1981. Players assume the role of a skeet shooter shooting clay pigeons. There is a two-player mode where the players alternate.

Skeet Shoot was developed by programmer Ed Salvo in his Iowa home and purchased by Pat Roper under the newly formed Apollo. Despite negative reviews, it was a financial success and led to Salvo's continuation with the company, where he became Director of Development.

== Gameplay ==
The shooter is at the bottom of the screen.

The player controls a skeet shooter who is shooting clay pigeons. By pressing the button on the controller, a clay pigeon is sent out and pressing the button again will shoot; moving the joystick changes the gun's angle. A point is earned if the bullet hits. Difficulty varieties adjust the speed of the pigeons.

Two two-player gameplay variations exist and are activated by modifying the Atari 2600's difficulty switches. There is an alternating version where players take turns shooting the clay pigeons, and another variation features one player shooting while the other controls the angle of the clay pigeons. Other variables that can be changed are the position of the shooter and the direction the bird will enter the screen from.

== Development ==
Ed Salvo developed Skeet Shoot independently. Salvo had self-taught himself to program for the Atari 2600 after purchasing an Atari 800; the dealer wanted a flight simulator for the 2600 so he contracted Salvo to make one. The game was never released as the dealer had lost interest. According to Salvo, the development of Skeet Shoot took him around a month at night in his home to finish. After his friend sent him an advertisement from a Dallas newspaper by newly founded studio Games by Apollo that asked for programmers, he contacted Apollo founder Pat Roper and showed him Skeet Shoot. Roper decided that Skeet Shoot was a good enough game for a first time. He offered Salvo a job at Apollo, which Salvo declined, believing it would be too risky. When Salvo returned to his Iowa home, Roper contacted him and told him he would buy Skeet Shoot for five thousand dollars which Salvo accepted.

Skeet Shoot still had glitches when it was released; one caused the image to flip vertically. Salvo learned of the glitch and fixed it, and the only cartridges that bear the bug are European versions.

== Reception ==
Reviews were negative, as Apollo's publicist Emmit Crawford acknowledged. Crawford believed that the reason people did not like Skeet Shoot was because it did not provide enough challenge for most video game players and that the company had distributed it in too much of a hurry. He later said that "All in all, Skeet Shoot wasn't a spectacular game to start off with." Despite the poor publicity, the game sold very well.

Author Brett Alan Weiss wrote that Skeet Shoot was "a shoddily programmed, graphically primitive game" and said that the poor controls and difficulty levels rendered the game "virtually worthless". A writer for Atari HQ called it a mediocre game. Lee Peppas of ANALOG Computing remarked that "Atari & Activision have nothing to fear from the graphics on this first release." TV Gamer opined it was one of the worst games for the system, saying that it was boring and criticizing the fact that it was difficult to hit the skeet.

Mark Androvich of Classic Gamer Magazine was similarly negative, writing "Games by Apollo released a couple of decent games before going bankrupt, but you never would have guessed that anyone at the company knew how to program the Atari 2600 judging by their debut game." Androvich opined that while the game was playable, it was not "a step in the right direction" for Apollo.

== Legacy ==
After Skeet Shoot, Salvo signed a contract that led to the creation of Spacechase. Eventually, Salvo became Apollo's Director of Development and was given the job of hiring 25 programmers to work on Apollo's games. Apollo went on to release seven other games after Skeet Shoot. One year later, the studio eventually filed for Chapter 11 bankruptcy on November 12, 1982, due to pressure from its advertising agency, Benton & Bowles. Apollo owed the company $2.5 million (half of its total debt). Although Roper expected Apollo to return in "smaller form", the company closed in 1983 after reorganization attempts failed.
