= Eduard Duller =

German writer (1809–1853)

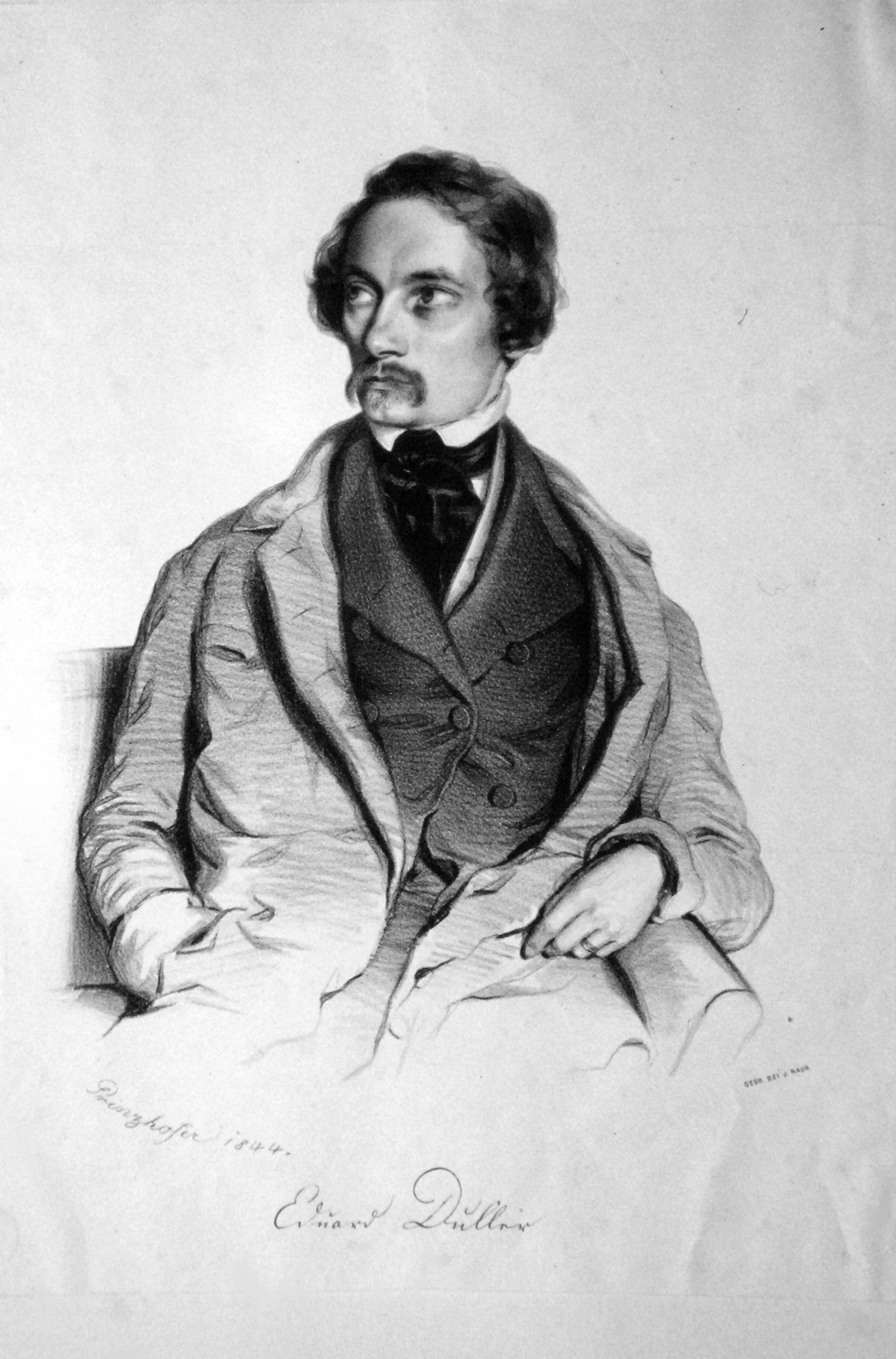
Eduard Dulleer, lithograph by August Prinzhofer, 1844

Eduard Duller (18 November 1809, Vienna – 24 July 1853, Wiesbaden) was a German-Austrian writer and clergyman, very active as a poet, novelist and later as a historian.

== Life ==
His biological father died before his birth and so he was brought up lovingly but strictly by his stepfather. A gifted child, he studied philosophy and law in his home town of Vienna as well as writing his first fiction, premiering his first play, titled Meister Pilgram, aged 17. His advanced humanist attitudes made him unsuited to Austrian education under the Metternich System and its Carlsbad Decrees, so in 1830 he left Austria for Munich, where in 1831 he premiered his play Die Wittelsbacher. A year later he mover to Trier, befriending and graduating alongside Friedrich von Sallet. In Trier he withdrew into himself, but gained the clergy's hatred through his play Franz von Sickingen.

In 1834 he moved to Frankfurt am Main and there began publishing the Phönix. Frühlings-Zeitung für Deutschland. (Phoenix - a spring magazine for Germany). This literary journal published fictional works by Georg Büchner, Christian Dietrich Grabbe and other Vormärz writers. Duller handed the editorship over to Karl Gutzkow in summer 1835 and in 1836 moved to Darmstadt, where stayed from then until 1849 and took a lively interest in the German Catholicism movement, which sought to remove papal influence on Catholicism in Germany. His most notable work from the modern perspective is his Die Jesuiten, a populist account of the history and present activities of the Jesuits - on page 109 of it, he wrote:

So I return to the work of a free Catholic church. I can do no other - I would like to stand guard, waiting, every hour of the day and night calling on every German heart - You Catholic priests and laity of Germany, join hands in a covenant, with no fear of man; God stands by brave men fighting for a fair thing, and this Germany, this land of freedom and truth will no longer be desecrated by an enslavement to Jesuits and papists... Your Protestant brothers do but form the rigid walls round this battlefield, on which the German Catholics stand, the living wall, that no Jesuit or papist can break through... So, if German Catholics become independent of Rome, a great day of peace will arise over a united Germany; and, even if it means the hardest efforts, the free life, honour and morality of a nation are worth such efforts.

The work presents a negative view of the Order, writing of its alleged hidden criminal activities, showing its moral and social principles as harmful and the Catholic Church as misusing religion. On page 97 he writes:

Nevertheless, in these things the Jesuits lie - as if only that Prince, only that state can be sure of the guardianship of the Order and even be left to it completely by the church, as so long, even to the present day, they have argued; and the weak in mind believe in it because with dull eyes the sacred and sublime nature of religion, without which there can no family and even more so no state, is only exercised in the garb of the Church (namely the Roman church) and this mixes it up completely with the priestly hierarchy.

He later moved again, to Mainz, where in 1851 he became priest to the German Catholic denomination. His grave is in the Hauptfriedhof Mainz.

== Works ==
=== Novels and poetry ===
- Kronen und Ketten (Frankfurt 1835, 3 volumes).
- Loyola (Frankfurt 1836, 3 volumes).
- Kaiser und Papst (Leipzig 1838, 4 volumes).
- Der Fürst der Liebe (Leipzig 1842, 2nd edition 1854).
- Gesammelten Gedichte (Berlin 1845; new edition, Leipzig 1877).

=== Histories ===
- Vaterländische Geschichte (Frankfurt 1852–57, 5 volumes; Microfiche-Ausgabe ISBN 3-598-50604-X), extended after Duller's death by Karl Hagen.
- Geschichte des deutschen Volkes (Leipzig 1840, 3. Ausl. 1846; newly edited by William Pierson, Berlin 1861; 6th edition 1877).
- Die Jesuiten, wie sie waren und wie sie sind (Leipzig 1845; 3rd edition, Brandenb.1861).
- a continuation of Schiller's Geschichte des Abfalls der Vereinigten Niederlande (History of the Revolt of the United Netherlands; Köln 1841, 3 volumes).
- Maria Theresia (Wiesbaden 1844, 2 Bände).
- Erzherzog Carl von Österreich (Wien 1847, Illustrations by Moritz von Schwind).
- Die Männer des Volks dargestellt von Freunden des Volks (Frankfurt 1847–50, 8 volumes) etc.

== Sources ==
- Duller, Eduard, in Constant von Wurzbach, Biographisches Lexikon des Kaiserthums Oesterreich, 3 volumes, Wien 1858.
