= Wabbit (disambiguation) =

Wabbit may refer to:

- Wabbit (computing), a computing term related to a type of denial of service attack
- New Looney Tunes, an American animated television series, known domestically as Wabbit for its first season
- Wabbit (video game), a 1982 video game for the Atari 2600 console
- Elmer Fudd's way of pronouncing "rabbit" and nickname for Bugs Bunny
