= Exfiltration =

Exfiltration, an antonym for infiltration, may stand for:

- The same as extraction (military) (also exfil)
- A method for managing stormwater runoff
- An air escape from a building, see ventilation (architecture)
- Used as a hacker near-synonym for data theft, unauthorized release of data from within a computer system or network
