= Infiltrator =

Infiltrator or variations thereof may refer to:

- In military combat, someone who practices infiltration tactics
- In espionage, a double agent joining an enemy organization

== Books ==
- The Infiltrators, a spy novel in the Matt Helm series
- Infiltrator, the first novel in the T2 (novel series) trilogy
- Infiltrator, a novel in the Worlds of Power series, a novelization of the video game

== Film and TV ==
- The Infiltrator (1995 film), a 1995 TV movie starring Oliver Platt
- The Infiltrator (2016 film), a 2016 crime drama film
- "Infiltrator" (Young Justice), a first season episode of the American animated TV show Young Justice

== Games ==
- Infiltrator (video game), a game released in 1986
- Medal of Honor: Infiltrator, a third-person shooter video game

== See also ==
- Infiltration (disambiguation)
