= Games by Apollo =

American video game developer (1981–1983)

Games by Apollo Inc.
- Type: Subsidiary
- Industry: Video games
- Founded: October 1981; 45 years ago
- Founder: Pat Roper
- Defunct: 1983
- Fate: Chapter 11 bankruptcy
- Headquarters: Richardson, Texas, U.S.
- Number of employees: 30
- Parent: National Career Consultants

Games by Apollo Inc. (also known as Apollo) was a third-party developer of games for the Atari 2600 video game system, based in Richardson, Texas. It was founded in October 1981 by Pat Roper as a subsidiary of his National Career Consultants (NCC). Apollo's first title was Skeet Shoot, and neither it nor the ten games that followed caught on, and the company was one of the first to declare bankruptcy as a result of the video game crash of 1983.

== Formation ==
Older logo used on some cartridges

In 1980, Pat Roper was president of Texas-based National Career Consultants (NCC), a producer of educational films. He knew nothing about the games industry, but while playing NFL Football on the Intellivision, he realized that there was money to be made. Roper formed a game company called Games by Apollo, citing the name "Apollo" as a recognizable symbol of youth and activity.

Instead of hiring away existing game designers from Mattel or Atari, as some developers had done, Roper placed an advertisement in the Dallas Morning News and the San Francisco Chronicle. Sent a copy of the Morning News ad by a friend, a young programmer from Iowa named Ed Salvo contacted Roper to pitch him Skeet Shoot, a game he had developed in about four weeks. Roper flew Salvo to Dallas and offered to make him lead developer for the nascent company. Salvo initially turned him down, thinking it was too risky.

After Salvo returned to Iowa, Roper contacted him and offered to buy Skeet Shoot for $5,000. Salvo accepted and agreed to a contract to develop a second game, Spacechase. With Games by Apollo now a going concern, Roper gave Salvo the job of director of development; his first job was to hire 25 programmers to develop games.

== Market presence ==
Games by Apollo was, after Activision, among the first third-party developers for the Atari 2600. Spacechase would become Apollo's bestselling title. One of the company's marketing ideas was a customized or "monogrammed" version of the game. Though fewer than ten were sold, several were given to press, including Electronic Games magazine co-founder Arnie Katz. PM Magazine sent Leeza Gibbons to Apollo's offices to film a segment on the company and Spacechase. During the segment, Salvo made a customized Spacechase for her, which involved changing an explosion graphic so that when her ship was destroyed, her initials appeared. Other programmers interviewed for the piece were Dan Oliver (Space Cavern), Steve Stringfellow (Lochjaw) and Ernie Runyon (Lost Luggage).

Space Cavern was the first scrolling 2600 game. It was created after Roper flew Salvo to the Winter Consumer Electronics Show (CES) in Vegas to see Imagic's new game Demon Attack. Roper had been very impressed and wanted one just like it. He gave programmer Dan Oliver the gameplay and specifications for Space Cavern without identifying where he got the idea, and Space Cavern became Apollo's third game.

Apollo attended the June 1982 CES in Chicago with a booth of their own, which included the obligatory hiring of models to demonstrate its games. Shortly after, they hired Cyndy Spence, formerly of Atari, as advertising director. She, in turn, brought in well-known advertising agency Benton & Bowles to represent Apollo.

Games by Apollo is also known for having the first human female game character in a home video game. Billy Sue, a strong woman, has to defend her farm from pesky rabbits in the game Wabbit (Atari 2600 VCS 1982).

Also of note was Lochjaw, a Pac-Man clone that involved sharks. MCA, the owner of Universal Studios, threatened to sue Apollo for copyright infringement of Jaws. Facing an expensive legal battle, Roper changed the title Shark Attack. The original Lochjaw cartridges had a very short shelf life and are therefore extremely rare.

By the end of 1982, Apollo also moved into designing games for the Atari 5200, ColecoVision, and Intellivision. None of these games made it into production before Apollo closed its doors in late 1983.

=== Decline ===
Early on, Roper spent much of the company's money on trying to emulate Activision. At one early staff meeting, he was quoted as saying that "Activision had $26 million in sales its first year so Apollo would have $27. Activision had a campus with seven buildings, every seven stories, so Apollo would have eight buildings of eight stories." According to Salvo, he built up production and inventory to sell $27 million but sales didn't happen. Roper also bought a helicopter rather than deal with Dallas’ congested Central Expressway, and hired an engineer to put it together and maintain it.

In late 1982, Ed Salvo, Terry Grantham, Mike Smith and one other employee left Apollo when it appeared that Roper was not taking the right steps to stay in business. Forming Video Software Specialists (VSS), they developed games for CBS Electronics, K-tel (Xonox), Sunrise, and Wizard Games. Salvo claims that two weeks after the four left, Apollo was forced into bankruptcy.

Under pressure from Benton & Bowles, the company's advertising agency, Apollo filed for Chapter 11 bankruptcy on November 12, 1982. Apollo owed Benton & Bowles $2.5 million, which represented only half of the year-old firm's total debts. Apollo president Patrick Roper's hoped to reorganize the company and return in smaller form, but that did not come to pass. Programmer Larry Martin stayed until the end, recalling that he had been working around-the-clock for several weeks, trying to finish the game Guardian. Immediately after he released it to manufacturing, the creditors moved in with court orders and shut the company down."

== Games developed ==
- Final Approach
- Guardian
- Infiltrate
- Lost Luggage
- Pompeii (unreleased)
- Racquetball
- Shark Attack (aka Lochjaw)
- Skeet Shoot
- Space Cavern
- Spacechase
- Squoosh (unreleased)
- Wabbit
