= Handheld TV game =

Type of video game console

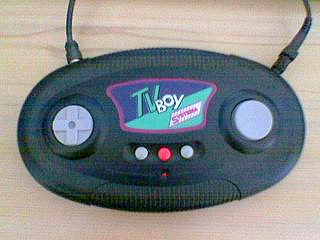
A TV Boy with power and TV attached

A handheld TV game or plug and play game is an integrated home video game console and game controller, usually battery powered, which connects directly to a television. The game software is built directly into the unit, which is typically designed to look like a toy or classic game console controller with the addition of a composite video cable to connect the unit. These systems usually contain either a collection of classic games or original games based on licensed properties. Because the game software is integrated into the game unit and almost never designed to be changed by the user, these game systems are typically marketed as electronic toys or collectibles rather than game consoles.

Several manufacturers produced these devices beginning in the 1990s, though the concept became best known with the release in 2002 of Jakks Pacific's Atari Classic 10-in-1 TV. Most manufacturers have their own trademarked names for these systems, such as Radica's Play TV or Majesco's TV Arcade; however, most retailers refer to them as "TV games" or "plug and play" games.

== History ==
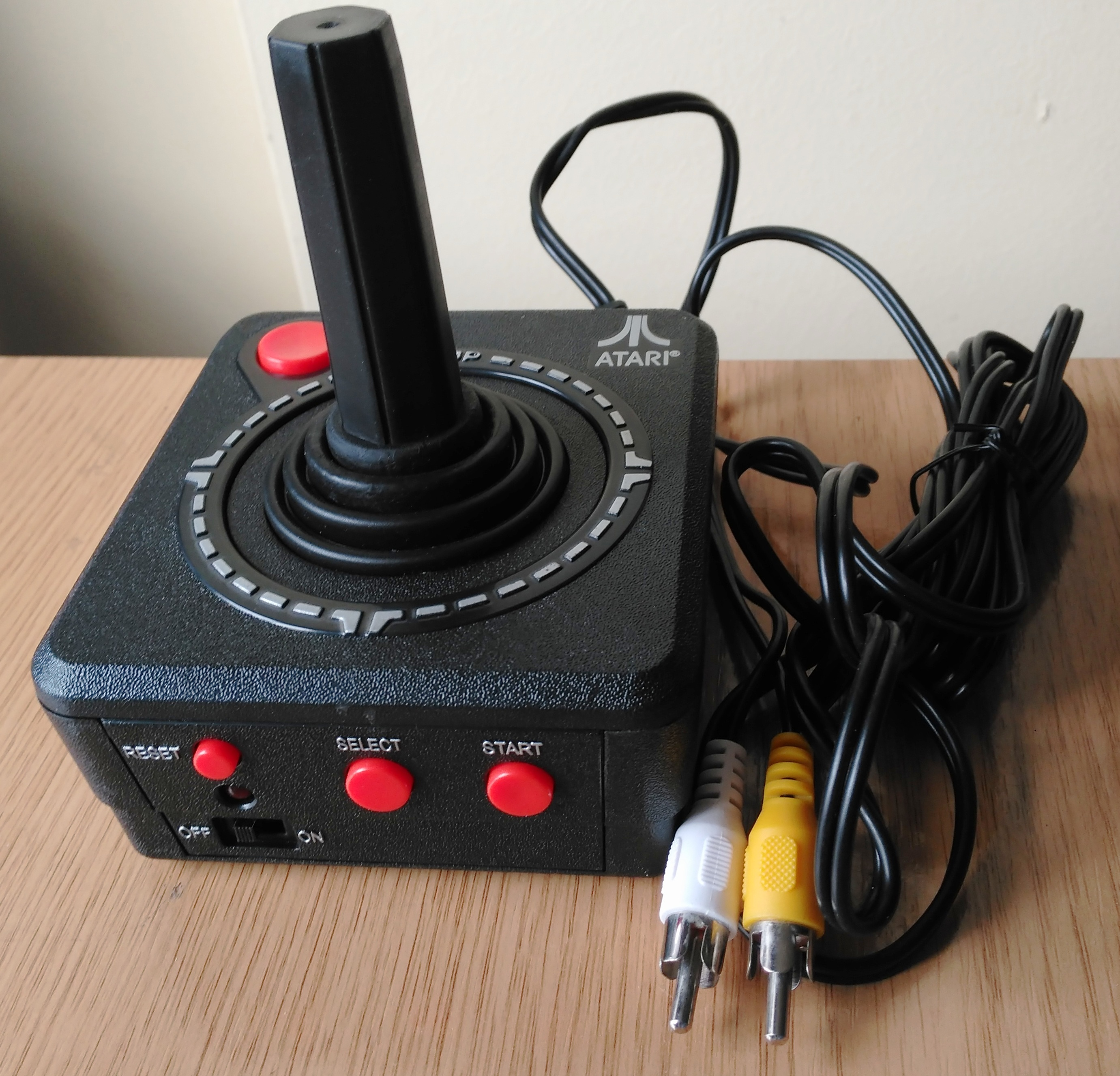
Atari Classic 10-in-1 TV games

From the mid-1990s to the early 2000s, three things happened: the retro game movement started to gain momentum, the price of system on a chip technology fell dramatically, and car television sets became popular. Several unlicensed family games, such as the TV Boy, were produced. These factors led to manufacturers officially licensing classic games. The first TV games include collections of classic games; one of the earliest is the Toymax Activision 10-in-1, released in 2001. The first TV games contain collections of classic games, and many manufacturers started incorporating original content and controls. Jakks Pacific reached licensing deals with Disney, Pixar, DC Comics, Marvel Comics, Nickelodeon, Cartoon Network, and others.

Criticism that video games were contributing to obesity in children led to the development of TV games with motion controls such as the Play TV series, including Play TV Baseball, Play TV Football, and Play TV Barbie Dance Craze in 2003. In 2004, Tiger Electronics created paintball and a The Lord of the Rings sword-fighting game, using a toy sword as the controller. In that year, Radica Games started producing collections of Sega games, such as Sonic the Hedgehog, Sonic the Hedgehog 2, Alex Kidd in the Enchanted Castle, Columns, and Gain Ground. The C64 Direct-to-TV was released in 2004 by Toy:Lobster and Mammoth Toys with a copy of the Commodore 64 operating system and a virtual keyboard as a hidden extra. In 2005, Jakks Pacific produced original game content for the new Star Wars and Fantastic Four films, and Tiger produced a Jedi lightsaber fighting game using a lightsaber as the controller. In 2005, Milton Bradley started producing TV game versions of Whack-a-Mole and Miniature Golf.

== Sales ==
By 2002, the original TV Games device from Jakks Pacific sold over 350,000 units. By 2004, the TV Games series had sold 1 million units. As of 2007, Pac-Man TV Games sold over 15 million units.

== See also ==
- Dedicated console
- Game system clone
- History of video games
- Handheld game console
