= Space Cavern =

1982 video game

- Developer: Games by Apollo
- Publisher: Games by Apollo
- Designer: Dan Oliver
- Platform: Atari 2600
- Release: August 25, 1982
- Genre: Fixed shooter
- Modes: Single-player, multiplayer

Space Cavern is a 1982 fixed shooter video game for the Atari 2600 developed and released by Games by Apollo. Players control a spaceship commander who has landed on a planet and must defend the ship against its hostile creatures. Games by Apollo founder Pat Roper was impressed by the game Demon Attack and tasked Apollo member Dan Oliver with making a game very similar to it.

== Gameplay ==
Screenshot with the player near the bottom

In Space Cavern, players control the commander of an intergalactic spaceship that is traveling through a previously unknown area in space. The spaceship lands on a mysterious planet inhabited by creatures known as Electrosauri and Marsupods, who attempt to attack the crew of the ship.

The player character is situated at the bottom of the screen. Leftward and rightward movements of the joystick correspond to leftward and rightward movements of the character. Moving the joystick upward and downward induces the character to fire left and right respectively. Pressing the controller button results in the character firing upward. The player must shoot enemy creatures that come from the top and bottom before they shoot the player character. Enemy creatures fire beams that cause the player to lose a life whenever contact is made with the character. An extra life is awarded every 2,000 points; points are earned by destroying enemies, with 115 or 165 points awarded for killing an Electrosaurus and 200 points for a Marsupod.

There are twenty-four gameplay variations included in Space Cavern; all are playable by one or two players and activated by modifying the 2600's difficulty switches. The variations differ in the number of enemies, their speed, the direction of their lasers, and the inclusion of Marsupods.

== Development ==
Company founder Pat Roper had flown programmer Ed Salvo to a Consumer Electronics Show to show him the Imagic video game Demon Attack. Impressed with Imagic's game, Roper decided he wanted to produce one similar to it. He told developer Dan Oliver what he wanted in the game without disclosing his inspiration. Space Cavern was released in 1982. Game publisher Panda rereleased an identical version of Space Cavern under the name Space Canyon the following year, and an Atari 5200 port was started but not completed.

As development neared completion, mounting financial pressures came to a head and Games by Apollo found itself owing nearly $5 million, half of which debt belonged to its advertising agency Benton & Bowles. Games by Apollo faced growing pressure from Benton & Bowles to repay its debts, and a few months after Space Cavern's release, on November 12, 1982, Games by Apollo filed for Chapter 11 bankruptcy. Although Roper expected Apollo to "return in smaller form", the company closed in 1983 after reorganization attempts failed.

== Reception ==
Arcade Express magazine was positive about Space Cavern, praising the graphics of the player's death, while criticizing the design of the enemies, and concluding by opining that the game was more suited to skilled players. In a review for Video magazine, Bill Kunkel and Arnie Katz did not agree whether Space Cavern's control scheme was unnaturally "cumbersome" or "an exciting departure from the expected". They wrote that the controls were "at least a little controversial" among arcade players. In a follow-up review for Electronic Games, Kunkel and Katz concluded that the game would entertain arcade players hundreds of times over but criticized the graphics of the enemies.

TV Gamer's called the game too simple and not requiring much brainpower. Videogaming Illustrated compared the game positively to Phoenix, and believed that it was "arguably the best space game on the market". The writer called it Apollo's best game and noted its suitability for both young and experienced players.

Space Cavern was an honorable mention in the "Best Action Video Game" category at the 1983 Arkie Awards.
