= Friedrich von Sallet =

German author

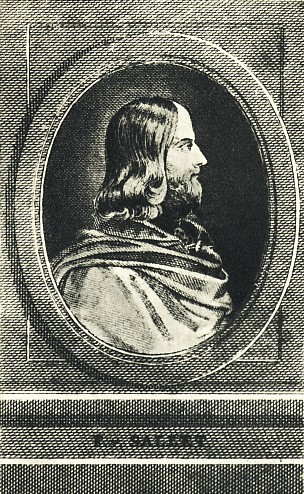
Friedrich von Sallet.

Friedrich von Sallet (20 April 1812 – 21 February 1843) was a German writer, most notable for his political and religion-critiquing poems.

== Biography ==
Von Sallet was born in Neiße. He attacked military events of the time in several satirical works. He died in Reichau bei Niemcza, Landkreis Strehlen (Silesia).

== Family ==
His sister, Marie Bloede, married the physician Gustav Bloede. They emigrated to the United States in the aftermath of the Revolutions of 1848 in Germany. Their son Victor Gustav Bloede became a noted chemist there.
