= Kathinka Zitz-Halein =

German writer (1801–1877)

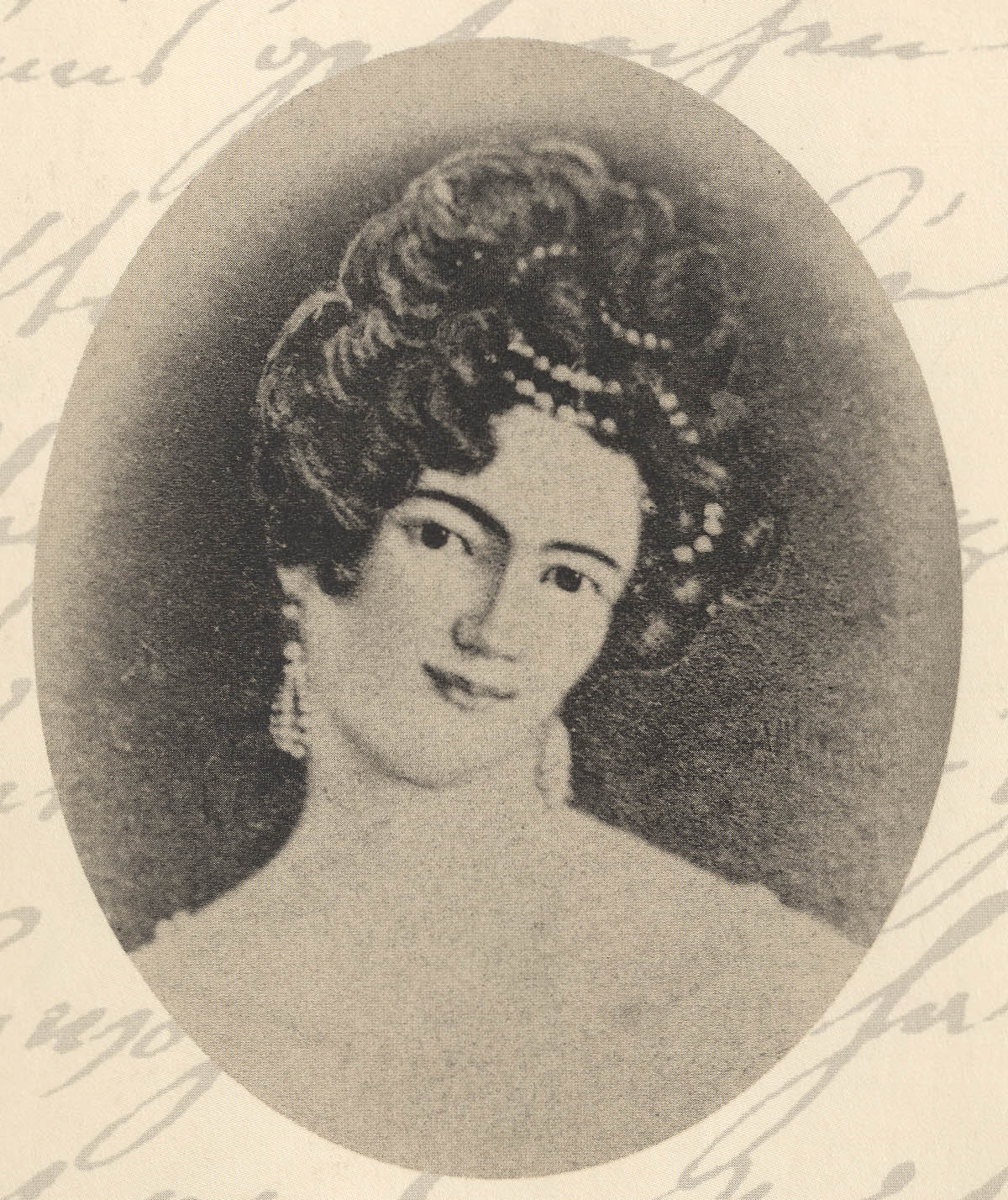
Kathinka Zitz-Halein

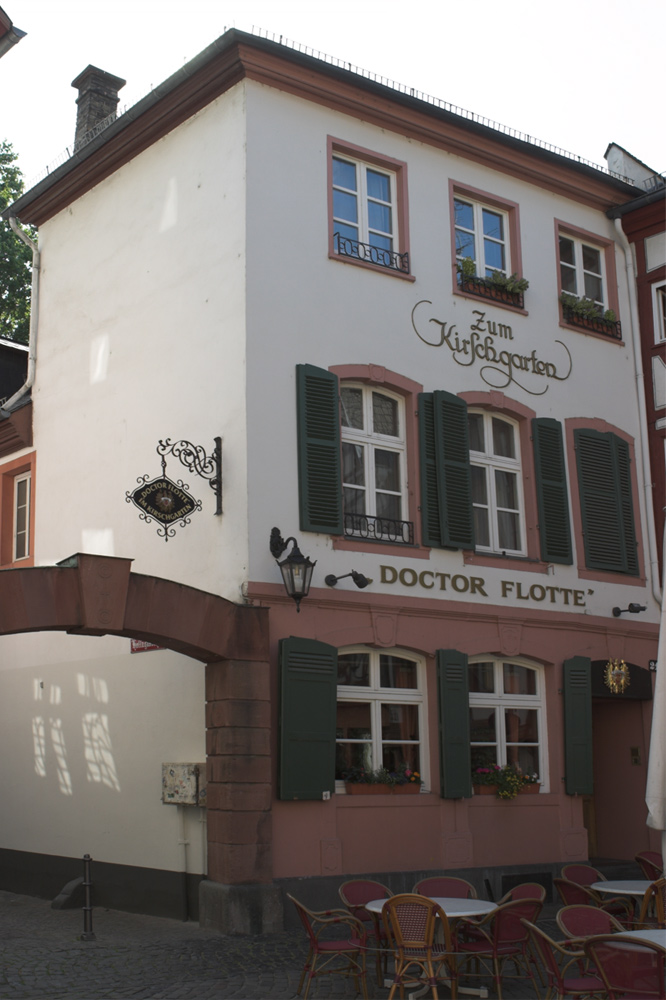
Kathinka Zitz-Halein birthplace in Mainz

Kathinka Zitz (née Halein; 4 November 1801 – 8 March 1877) was a German poet, short story writer, journalist, translator and novelist who has been called "the poet laureate of the German Revolution".

== Biography ==
Kathinka Halein grew up in Mainz. Born to Anton Victor and Anna Marie Markowitzka Halein. The family was well off until the Napoleonic Wars. During the wars they were forced to live sparingly and moved in with Zitz-Halein's maternal grandmother's house. Her mother died on 26 May 1825, and her father grew increasingly erratic and violent.

In the early 1820s she was given power of attorney and ran the family's business. Zitz-Halein worked as a governess for three years but returned to Mainz to care for her young sister. She provided income for the family by selling embroidery and teaching French lessons. In the 1830s she translated three novels by Victor Hugo. On 3 June 1837 she married a distant relative, the prominent Mainz attorney and 1848 revolutionary Dr. Franz Heinrich Zitz. They lived together for two years. She wrote for the Mannheimer Abendzeitung, opposing censorship and calling for reform in marriage, divorce and guardianship laws. In the German revolutions of 1848–49 she founded and was first president of the Humania Association, the largest revolutionary women's organization. A prolific short story writer, in the 1860s she wrote fictionalized biographical novels of Goethe, Heine, Rahel Varnhagen and Byron.

== Published works ==
Kathinka Zitz-Halein's published works as cited by An Encyclopedia of Continental Women Writers.

Translations:

- Marion der Lorme, 1833.
- Triboulet, oder der Königs Hofnarr, 1835.
- Cromwell, 1835.

Novels:

- Goethe, 1863.
- Heine, 1864.
- Rahel Varnhagen, 1864.
- Byron, 1867.
- Für einen übertreibenden Deutschthümler, 1991.

Children's books:

- Die jungen Helden. Ein Buch für Knaben, Mainz, J.Scholz, 1840.
