= Great Escape (1983 video game) =

1983 video game

- Developer: Onbase Co.
- Publisher: Bomb
- Platform: Atari 2600
- Release: UK: 1983; DE: 1983; NA: 1983
- Genre: Multidirectional shooter
- Mode: Single-player

Great Escape for the Atari 2600

Great Escape is a multidirectional shooter published for the Atari 2600 in 1983. It was produced by Bomb, a line of video games from developer Onbase Co. based out of Asia. It received mixed-to-negative reviews from critics, with reviewers making comparisons with Defender and Asteroids.

== Gameplay ==
The player controls a spaceship that can move in the four cardinal directions and destroy enemy ships and asteroids. A radar screen shows where adversaries may be located, and a "super-alien" will destroy the player if it appears on the same screen as the player's ship. The game is single-player only.

== Reception ==
TV Gamer magazine criticised the graphics, compared it negatively to other games from Bomb such as Assault, and described it as "without a doubt, one to avoid". Videogaming Illustrated compared it to Asteroids. German magazine TeleMatch gave it 3/6 overall, with 2/6 for gameplay but 4/6 for sound (6 being "worst").
