= Lochjaw =

1982 video game

- Original Atari 2600 Box Art
- Developer: Games by Apollo
- Publisher: Games by Apollo
- Designer: Steve Stringfellow
- Platform: Atari 2600
- Release: NA: June 1982; PAL: December 1982
- Genre: Maze
- Modes: Single-player, multiplayer

Lochjaw, also known as Shark Attack, is a 1982 video game published by Games by Apollo and released exclusively for the Atari 2600. The game is a maze game, similar to Pac-Man, in which players take on the role of a deep sea diver who must explore a maze and collect diamonds while avoiding attacking sharks and the Loch Ness Monster. The game was initially released under the title Lochjaw, but following the threat of legal action from MCA, the parent company of Universal Pictures and copyright holders for the film Jaws, the title was changed to Shark Attack for later releases.

== Gameplay ==
A screenshot of gameplay, with a shark currently in the shark cage in the center of the screen.

In Lochjaw, the player takes control of a deep sea diver attempting to recover diamonds that have spilled out of the hold of a sinking Spanish galleon. Diamonds, represented by yellow dots, are scattered throughout a kelp maze. Collecting a diamond nets the player one point so long as the player can return to the shark cage at the center of the maze. The shark cage also serves as a safe point from roaming sharks, which travel horizontally from one side of the screen to the other straight through the walls of the maze. Getting hit by a shark causes the player to lose one of their three lives, before eventually getting a game over. Sharks can also collect diamonds, meaning the longer the player takes to explore the maze the less points they will be able to obtain. Collect all of the diamonds on the screen and the maze resets for another round.

The maze also contains caves tucked into each of the maze's four corners. If the player moves into a cave, they will be teleported to another one of the maze's caves at random. The Loch Ness Monster will also emerge occasionally from one of these four caves and will navigate the maze to attempt to catch the player. The monster will disappear only if it happens to follow the player back through one of the caves.

== Development ==
Lochjaw was designed and programmed by Steve Stringfellow, an employee of Games by Apollo. Apollo management at the time mandated a four to six week turnaround for development on their games. By Lochjaw's fourth week of development, a playable prototype of the game had already been developed with much of the graphics already finalized and basic maze navigation implemented. According to Stringfellow, there were about twenty different versions of the player character before the diver design was finalized. Some early player character concepts included a spider-like creature and a spaceship.

== Release ==
Soon after the game's initial release, Games by Apollo was contacted by MCA, the corporate owners of the Jaws franchise, who threatened to sue over the "jaw" portion of the Lochjaw title. In response, Apollo agreed to change the name on all future Lochjaw cartridges to Shark Attack. Apollo president Pat Roper believed that the name was not legally infringing and that Apollo's lawyers would have won the suit if the company had gone to court. According to Roper, Apollo had settled because they were "too busy to get involved in litigation against Universal".

Because of the name change, copies of the game bearing the Lochjaw title are rare compared to ones bearing the Shark Attack title. For this reason, Lochjaw copies are seen by some as valuable collector's items.

== Reception ==
Reception

Review scores
Publication	Score
Arcade Express	7/10
Computer Entertainer	2/4 2½/4
The Book of Atari Software	C+

Lochjaw is frequently criticized as being unoriginal, with many reviewers comparing the game unfavorably to Pac-Man and other "gobble games". Many reviewers also complained about the game's joystick controls and the tendency of the player to get stuck on walls. Mike from The Logical Gamer described the game as "sheer frustration" and the movement to be "too slow and bothersome". JoyStik Magazine described manuevering the diver as "a slow, painful process". Several reviewers described the game's graphics as blurry and below average.

Other reviewers were more positive towards the game. Arcade Express described the game as "a toughie" but "worth the effort". Alan from The Logical Gamer attested to having a lot of fun playing the game and saw it as a "pleasant and inventive variation on the Pac-Man theme". UK magazine TV Gamer in the summer of 1983 called the game "one of the best to come from Apollo".
