= Marie Bloede =

American author

- Born: 29 September 1821; Wrocław (then Breslau), Silesia
- Died: 12 March 1870 (aged 48); Brooklyn, New York
- Occupations: Author, poet
- Writing career
- Pen name: Marie Westland

Marie Bloede (29 September 1821 – 12 March 1870) was an American author of German descent, who also published under the pseudonym Marie Westland.

== Early life ==
Bloede was born Marie Antoinette Franziska Jungnitz in Wrocław (then Breslau), Silesia, to Johanna Maria Friederike Jungnitz (née Schmieder) and Karl Ferdinand Jungnitz (a Justice of the Supreme Court of Silesia).

Her half-brother, Friedrich von Sallet, was a poet, an intense liberal in his political views. He died in 1843. Bloede shared his poetical gifts and his liberal sympathies.

== Career ==
She married early, and in opposition to the wishes of her family, in circa 1844 around the age of 23. Her husband, Gustavas "Gustav" Blöede (23 September 1814 – 1 May 1888), born in Dresden to Auguste Sophia Juliane (née von Langen) and Karl August Blöede, was a physician. Gustav became and member of the city council of Dresden during the revolution of 1848. He was foremost in the liberal ranks, had to flee Dresden to avoid arrest, made his way to Brussels and then disappeared. The family (Marie, Gustav, and their three children, Gertrude, Kate and Victor) reunited and sailed from Antwerp on 14 July 1850, aboard the Julia Howard, arriving in New York on 21 August.

She published Princess Sheba, Vittoria, Godiva, Three narrative poems in 1868 and Enoch Arden v. Tennyson in 1869.

The Bloedes' home was frequented by noted writers, among them Bayard Taylor, Edmund Clarence Stedman, Thomas Aldrich and Richard Henry Stoddard. Marie Bloede's poems and articles, both in English and German, attracted attention. She also assisted her husband, he was the editor of the New-Yorker Demokrat, a daily Republican paper, using her literary skills.

Bloede died in Brooklyn, New York. Gustav died in Catonsville, Maryland.

== Family ==
Gustav and Marie Bloede's daughters included the poet Gertrude Bloede (1845–1905), Kate (1848–1891; who married the American artist, naturalist and teacher Abbott Handerson Thayer), and Indiana "Indie" (1854–1936; married Samuel Thomas King, a New York City area physician and surgeon). Their son was the chemist and businessman Victor Gustav Bloede (1849–1937).
