= Gertrude Bloede =

American poet

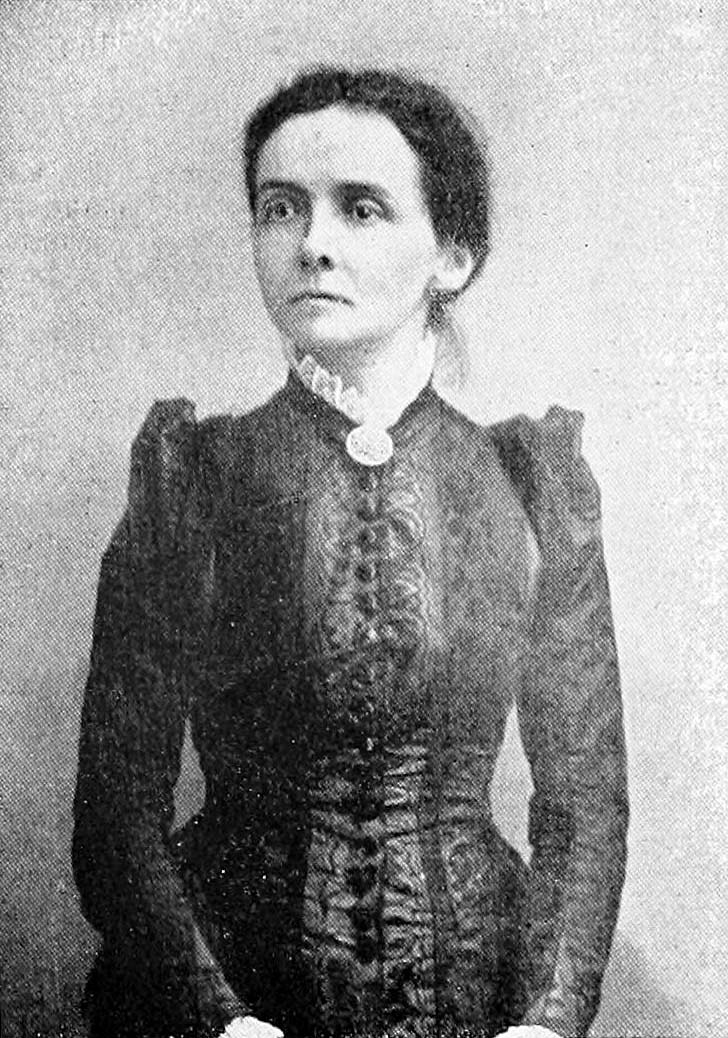

Gertrude Bloede (10 August 1845 – 14 August 1905) was a United States poet. She used the pen name “Stuart Sterne” for her publications.

== Biography ==
Bloede was born in Dresden, Kingdom of Saxony. Her father and mother were refugees who fled Germany after the revolution of 1848. The family arrived in the United States in 1850, where her mother, Marie Bloede, became noted for her poetry and prose, and her father, Gustavus Bloede, edited the New-Yorker Demokrat, a Republican newspaper. Her parents were good friends of poet and literary critic Bayard Taylor, at whose home they met Edmund Clarence Stedman, Richard Henry Stoddard, Thomas Bailey Aldrich and other well-known poets and authors of the United States.

Bloede was privately educated. Beginning in 1861, she made her home in Fort Greene, Brooklyn, living with her sister, the wife of S. T. King, at 34 Greene Ave. Bloede's brief self-assessment of her work and personality was: “There is very little to tell. I have published five volumes of poems, and that is all. I live very quietly. I go into society but little, and I do not belong to anything.” Bloede professed to find in the city the seclusion which pastoral poets find in rural life.

Although she went into society but little, she numbered among her friends prominent literary people of New York. She was not a member of any of the women's organizations in Brooklyn, as she felt that the art work of societies from which men were excluded amounted to little. She was interested in art, music and languages. She spoke English, French and German with fluency, and read Dutch, Italian and Latin with ease. She died, aged 60, in Baldwin, Long Island.

== Work ==
Bloede's childhood surroundings and talents impelled her to write. Her first book was a small volume of short poems, published in 1875. It was favorably reviewed in The New York Times. After much inquiry, Bloede learned that the review was written by Richard Grant White, who was greatly impressed by the quality of her work. That was her first critical recognition.

She used the name “Stuart Sterne” for all her works, and even after that name had become widely known, very few readers were aware that its owner was a woman. She adopted the name because she felt men's work was considered stronger than women's, and she wished her work to be judged by the highest standards and to stand or fall on its own merits.

In 1878, she published Angelo, which she dedicated to White. He read the manuscript, and, on his representations, a prominent Boston house published it. Its success was instantaneous. It went through sixteen printings. She also published Giorgio (Boston, 1881), a long poem; Beyond the Shadows and Other Poems (Boston, 1888); and Piero da Castiglione (Boston, 1890), a story in verse of the time of Savonarola. She also produced a novel, The Story of Two Lives (New York, 1892).

Her biographer for American National Biography, Ann Perkins, notes that, although she was popular in her day, Bloede's work has not aged very well.

== Family ==
Her brother, Victor Gustav Bloede, was a noted chemist. Her sister, Kate (1848-1891), was the first wife of artist Abbott Handerson Thayer.
