= Z-Tack =

1983 video game

- Developer: Onbase Co.
- Publisher: Bomb
- Platform: Atari 2600
- Release: UK: 1983; DE: 1983; NA: 1983
- Genre: Shoot 'em up
- Modes: Single-player, multiplayer

Z-Tack is a shoot 'em up for the Atari 2600 from Asia-based developer Onbase Co. and published under its Bomb label in 1983. The player controls an alien ship flying above a city with a goal of destroying bases nestled in the buildings. There are six different city-landscapes. The game received mixed reviews from critics and was described as an inverted version of Imagic's Atlantis.

== Gameplay ==
Z-Tack on Atari 2600

The player is presented with an alien UFO-like spacecraft, which is tasked with destroying bases in a cityscape to advance to the next level. The player must avoid missiles, which include heat-seeking-type missiles, as well as flying skulls. There are six different cityscapes. The game can be played in both single-player and two-player mode. It is the reverse of the 1982 video game Atlantis, where a city must be defended.

== Reception ==
Contemporary reviews of Z-Tack were mixed. In 1983, TV Gamer magazine described it as "probably the second-best video game to come from this new company, BOMB, the best being Assault" and "not a world-beating game but well worth having a look". Videogaming Illustrated gave it good marks for gameplay (B, B+) but marked it down for lack-lustre graphics (C−, D). German magazine TeleMatch gave it 3/6 overall, describing it as a "relatively inexpensive shooting game" but criticizing its lack of originality. The Australian magazine Score reviewed the game positively in their 1983 review, praising the "colourful" graphics and sound, though also noting that they were "simplistic".

Writing in 2018 in The A-Z of Atari 2600 Games: Volume 1, Kieran Hawken gave the game 7/10, praising particularly the graphics.
