= Wabbit (video game) =

1982 video game

- Developer: Apollo
- Publisher: Apollo
- Programmer: Van Mai
- Platform: Atari VCS
- Release: October 1982
- Genre: Action

Wabbit is a 1982 video game developed by Apollo for the Atari 2600. It is an action video game in which the player controls a girl, Billie Sue, who must shoot eggs at rabbits named 'wabbits' invading a carrot patch to earn points. Wabbit was developed by Vietnamese-American programmer Van Mai, who pitched the idea to the developer, and was given creative freedom to design, program and animate the game. Wabbit received a limited release and minimal marketing, as Apollo filed for bankruptcy shortly after publication.

At release, Wabbit received mixed reviews, with praise for its visuals and criticism directed at its slow pace and repetition. Following release, the game garnered retrospective recognition by the Video Game History Foundation as the earliest surviving video game to feature a named, playable female protagonist. In 2022, video game researchers and the Foundation were able to identify Mai as the developer of the game from Apollo's bankruptcy records.

== Gameplay ==
The player stands at the bottom of the screen and must throw eggs up at the wabbits before they steal the carrots.

Players assume the role of Billie Sue, a girl who is tending carrots while warding off rabbits named 'wabbits'. The objective of the game is to throw rotten eggs at the wabbits as they appear onscreen, before they reach the carrots and steal them; when the wabbits steal 100 carrots, the game is over. Wabbits appear from ten burrows placed on either side of ten horizontal rows of carrots, and when hit with an egg, they return to their burrow. Players earn points every time a wabbit is hit by an egg. Wabbit features eight game modes, with players able to select one or two players, and the number of wabbits. A simpler difficulty mode aimed at children is also available for one or two players.

== Development and release ==
Wabbit was developed by Van Mai, a Vietnamese-American programmer, credited under her maiden name Van Tran, and published by Richardson, Texas-based developer Apollo.. Mai's family migrated to Dallas, Texas when she was a teenager, and undertook work in the city's school district teaching computer lessons in BASIC. She began work with Apollo responding to a newspaper advertisement seeking programmers. Apollo colleague Dan Oliver stated that Mai impressed the company at interview by pitching an "extremely intense concept" for a game that he considered "20 years ahead of its time". Mai states that she separately proposed the idea for Wabbit once recruited as a game directed at girls as an audience during a team meeting, and had the independence to design, program and animate the game on her own. The game was developed under the working title of Squoosh prior to release.

Wabbit was announced in September 1982, and advertised for release on the Atari VCS in October of that year. In November 1982, Apollo filed for Chapter XI bankruptcy during a crash in video game sales. As a result, the game received a limited release and was one of the last published by the developer, as advertising and distribution of the game ceased from bankruptcy. The game was imported and distributed in the United Kingdom by Vulcan Electronics in 1983.

== Reception ==
Wabbit received mixed reviews upon release. Describing the game as "too deliberate for action fans and too one-dimensional for hardened videogamers", E.C. Meade of Videogaming and Computer Gaming Illustrated critiqued the game for being boring and the egg-throwing to be slow. Jim Clark, also writing for the same magazine, framed the game more favorably, saying that shooting the wabbits involved aiming and timing, but considered these mechanics were too difficult for children. The Logical Gamer felt the game had visual appeal, but stated "there really isn't enough meat to this game for adults to stay interested in it for long". Author Brett Weiss retrospectively stated that "The graphics are very nice, but a sense of inevitability and an uneven level of difficulty make the game less fun than it should be."

=== Legacy ===
Wabbit has retrospectively been credited as one of the first video games, and the first console game, to feature a playable female protagonist. Video game historians Kate Willaert and Kevin Bunch worked for over a decade to locate Van Mai as the creator of the game, originally misidentified as Ban Tran, a variation of Mai's maiden name. In 2022, in collaboration with the Video Game History Foundation, Willaert and Bunch successfully identified, located and contacted Mai after locating her name in Texas bankruptcy records for Apollo. Interviewed by the Foundation, Mai stated that she was proud of herself for working with the limitations of the VCS and had fond memories of her time in the industry, although the company's bankruptcy meant that it took nearly seven years to receive royalties for the game. Following her time in Apollo, she worked for a company named MicroGraphic Image, developing an Atari 5200 conversion of the game Solar Fox. She then left the industry, moved to California to earn a degree in computer science, and returned to Texas to work in the telecommunications and banking sector.

== See also ==
- Carol Shaw – American video game designer
- Joyce Weisbecker – American engineer and early video game designer
