= Parachute (video game) =

1983 video game

- Developer(s): Gem International Corporation
- Publisher(s): Home Vision/VDI
- Platform(s): Atari 2600
- Release: 1983
- Genre(s): Action game
- Mode(s): Single-player

Parachute (aka Von Himmel durch die Hoelle) is an action video game for the Atari 2600 released in 1983 by Homevision. The game puts the player in the role of parachutist falling gently from the sky.

In order to land safely, the player must evade aeroplanes, helicopters, birds and hot-air balloons. After successfully navigating several screens that progressively increase in speed, the parachutist finally emerges near ground level. In order to achieve a safe landing, the player must simultaneously avoid touching the pacing guard at the bottom while positioning the parachuter on the ground. A higher point bonus is awarded if the parachuter lands near the center of the screen. After landing, the game begins again at an increased difficulty level.

Parachute is one of a few Atari 2600 games with in-game background music. The main theme loops throughout the game while occasionally changing pitch.
