= Victor Gustav Bloede (chemist) =

German-American chemist (1849–1937)

Victor Gustav Bloede I
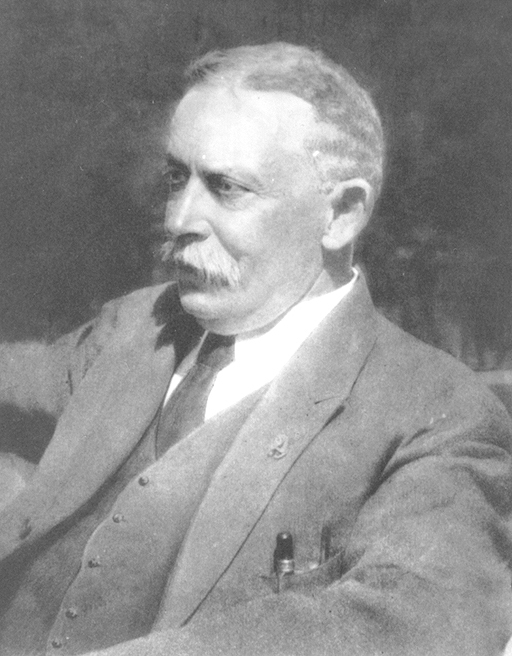
- Bloede circa 1900
- Born: March 14, 1849; Dresden, Kingdom of Saxony
- Died: March 27, 1937 (aged 88); Catonsville, Maryland, US
- Citizenship: Germany; United States
- Education: Cooper Institute, New York
- Known for: Entrepreneurship; Philanthropist
- Children: Victor Gustav Bloede II
- Parent(s): Marie Franziska Jungnitz; Gustav Bloede
- Relatives: Gertrude Bloede, sister Victor Gustav Bloede III, grandson
- Awards: Edward Longstreth Medal (1894)

Victor Gustav Bloede I (March 14, 1849 – March 27, 1937), (pronounced as Blerda) was a chemist and manufacturer of chemicals, president of the Victor G. Bloede Company, and businessman.

== Early life and education ==
Bloede was born in 1849, in Dresden, Kingdom of Saxony, the son of Marie Franziska Jungnitz and Gustav Bloede. Gustav was a physician and member of the city council of Dresden during the German revolutions. Gustav had to flee Germany and made his way to Antwerp where he waited for his family to arrive. The family (Marie, Gustav, and their three children, Gertrude, Kate and Victor) sailed from Antwerp on July 14, 1850, aboard the Julia Howard, arriving in New York on August 21. Upon coming to the United States, Gustav Bloede served as a surgeon in the American Civil War. After the war the family settled in Brooklyn, New York. The cultured Bloede home became a salon, which attracted such 19th-century figures as Thomas Bailey Aldrich. Victor received the groundwork of his education in public school and by the age of 12 he began to support himself by working as an office boy and earned the means to pursue his studies. While working by day he studied at night at the Cooper Institute (more properly known as Cooper Union) in New York City, where he was mentored by Peter Cooper.

His mother, Marie Bloede was his chief inspiration, guiding, encouraging, and strengthening his growth. His family was one of marked culture, not only had his father distinguished himself by work in natural sciences, but on his mother's side as well, two uncles had been prominent in literature and politics. Like his father, Victor also became interested in natural science as he studied at the Cooper Institute. He graduated in 1867, earning a degree in engineering at the age of 18. He was also privileged to have been a personal acquaintance of Peter Cooper, the great industrialist, inventor, philanthropist, and founder of the institution, whose example and teachings were strongly influential in molding Victor's character and in his life work.

== Career ==
In 1868 Bloede secured a position at Chemical Works, a small chemical company in Brooklyn, New York, along the Gowanus creek canal. There he began to study chemical manufacturing and pharmaceutical preparations. In 1873 Bloede moved to Pomeroy, Ohio, the center of salt manufacturing along the Ohio River. He joined the Oakes & Rathbone Company in Parkersburg, West Virginia, which produced sulfuric acid for the bromine distillers in the region. The plant was located on the south side of the Little Kanawha River a tributary of the Ohio River. Oakes left the firm in 1875 and Bloede acquired his interests, the company became known as Bloede & Rathbone. The product line was extended to iron sulfates, iron nitrate, tin salts, mordants and other chemicals used mainly by the textile industry. Bloede's familiarity with the textile industry led to the idea of manufacturing aniline dyes to increase profits. At the time most dyes were imported from Germany. There were only two companies producing dyes in the U.S. Bloede was determined to manufacture aniline by nitrating benzene to form nitrobenzene, followed by reduction. One problem he faced was to purify benzene from the light tar oils, which was supplied in barrels by coal tar distilleries and gas plants. Lacking a distillation column, he used an old boiler shell connected with a condensing coil but the benzene quality was poor.

He then consulted with a distillation expert, James A. Moffett, who was operating the Camden branch of the Standard Oil Company of Parkersburg, Moffett was convinced that dye manufacturing could be profitable and invested money in Bloede & Rathbone. Dye manufacturing was organized as a separate entity named the American Aniline Works. The founders of the new company had little dye-making experience so they read German texts on the subject. There was no money left for new equipment, so they had to rely on scrapped equipment they obtained from the Standard Oil junk pile. Instead of a heavy cast iron nitrator, an old boiler shell with a capacity of 1,000 gallons (3785 Litres) was fitted with a central shaft of horizontal wrought iron paddles. The valve regulating the flow of acid into the nitrator was operated by a wire several hundred feet away. The operator would periodically run close enough to the nitrator to read the thermometer and run back to safety. Cooling was accomplished by running cold spring water over the top and sides of the nitrator, keeping the reaction within a range of five degrees Fahrenheit. This procedure resulted in 7,000 to 8,000 pounds (3175 – 3628 kg) of nitrobenzene per batch. In 1883 he established himself in Baltimore as a chemist and manufacturer of chemical products; and decided that there was a wide field for improvement in the methods then in use in chemical factories. Applying his skills he made tremendous advances in the chemistry business, mainly in the methods of dyeing cotton fabrics; and between 1890 and 1895 he obtained 15 or 20 patents for his chemical processes, one of the most important patents being his process for the dyeing "sun-fast", unfading shades.

Bloede's Dam (ca.1908)

In 1906, Bloede organized the Avalon Water Works and the Patapsco Electric & Manufacturing Co. He financed the construction of Bloede's Dam, a hydroelectric dam which impounds the Patapsco River to serve as a power generating plant for the Patapsco Electric & Manufacturing Company, a service providing electricity to Catonsville, Maryland and the surrounding areas. Bloede's dam was the first known Hydroelectric dam of-its-kind in the country. He also organized the First National Bank of Catonsville, of which he was vice-president for 10 years, and in 1908 he was made president. He projected the Baltimore, Catonsville and Ellicott City Electric railway, and he helped to organize the National City Bank of Baltimore, in 1910 and became one of its directors. His performance gave him notability in other business relations which contributed to him being in great demand on various boards of directors.

He died at his home in Catonsville, Maryland.

== Philanthropy ==
the Marie Bloede Memorial Wing at the Eudowood Sanitorium. (ca. 1930)

While Bloede received a number of medals for his various useful and economic inventions, he also proved himself a benefactor to society in general. On November 10, 1908, he presented the Hospital for Consumptives of Maryland (a tuberculosis sanitorium), with a new building. The institution, which came to be known as the Eudowood Sanitorium, began operation in June 1899, existed on a 23 acre (0.093 km²) campus in Towson, Maryland until July 1964. Bloede's structure was dedicated as the Marie Bloede Memorial Hospital for Advanced Consumptives in honor of his mother and was one of several buildings that made up the facility. It was accepted by Dr. Henry Barton Jacobs, as president, in the presence of the Governor of Maryland, Austin Lane Crothers, Reverend Bishop William Paret, Mayor of Baltimore, J. Barry Mahool, and a large and distinguished gathering. The last remnant of the hospital complex, a barn that was originally part of the Stansbury farm that previously existed there, still stands.

Bloede was the underwriter of many other important benefactions and made many improvements in his home town of Catonsville, Maryland.

== Scientific affiliations ==
Bloede was an active member of a number of scientific associations, including:

- the International Society of Chemical Industry
- the American Chemical Society
- the Chemists' Club of New York City

== Writings ==
His scientific writings include:

- Bloede, Victor G. (1924). "Some Early Attempts to Establish the Aniline Industry in United States". Ind. Eng. Chem. 16 (4): 409–411. doi:10.1021/ie50172a035.
- Bloede, Victor G. (1867). The Reducer's Manual and Gold and Silver Worker's Guide.

== Notable inventions ==
Invented the adhesive on postage stamps and envelopes.

== Personal and family life ==
On June 5, 1883, he married Elise Schon, daughter Carl Schon Sr. from Toledo, Ohio, who designed and built summer cottages on Eden Terrace in Catonsville. Earlier, he had designed many buildings in Toledo and was superintendent of the Toledo waterworks for over 15 years.

With this marriage, he gained a lifelong companionship. Mr. and Mrs. Bloede had five children: Marie, Carl S, Ilse, Victor Gustav Bloede II, and Vida. Bloede had a strong personality, alert, progressive, and insightful. He believed in physical and mental exercise for a sound body and mind, he recommended to others which methods he himself had used and gained such success. In his free time he took interest in fishing, rowing and walking, he also enjoyed playing quoits and other games with family and friends and found a wealth of enjoyment in his mental exercises.

Perseverance he believed, is the secret of success. He said:

Never give up an undertaking because it is hard and unpromising, but persist until you succeed. I have observed that men seldom fail to accomplish any task or aim which they have set before them when their motto is 'Never give up trying'. Persistence is the great single element in success. Have a purpose in life, seek associates among those to whom you can look up, observe men and women of strong character.

One of his sisters was a noted poet, Gertrude Bloede (1845-1905). His other two sisters were Kate (1848-1891; who married the American artist, naturalist and teacher Abbott Handerson Thayer), and Indiana "Indie" (1854-1936; married Samuel Thomas King, a New York City area physician and surgeon).

His grandson was Victor Gustav Bloede III (1920-1999), an advertising executive with Benton & Bowles.
