= Spacechase =

1982 video game

- Developer: Games by Apollo
- Publisher: Games by Apollo
- Designer: Ed Salvo
- Platform: Atari 2600
- Release: January 1982
- Genre: Fixed shooter
- Modes: Single-player, multiplayer

Spacechase is a fixed shooter video game for the Atari Video Computer System (later called the Atari 2600) written by Ed Salvo and published by Games by Apollo in 1982.

== Gameplay ==
Gameplay screenshot

In orbit of an unnamed "moon," the player uses a Starcruiser to destroy formations of alien enemy raiders that attack from above. The lunar surface rotates in the background, but has no effect on gameplay. The player's ship can maneuver in eight directions within the lower third of the game screen. As the game advances, the aliens attacks begin to include "Lazer-Directed Heat-Seeking Proton Missiles".

There are single and two-player games; players alternate turns in the latter. The game can be handicapped for each player by setting the Atari's Difficulty Switch. In the "A" position the player's shots are slower than when the switch is in the "B" position.

== Reception ==
Spacechase became Apollo's best selling title. Apollo also marketed Spacechase with an offer to make customized or "monogrammed" versions of Spacechase. Less than 10 were sold, and several were given to press including Electronic Games magazine co-founder Arnie Katz.

PM Magazine visited Apollo's offices to film a segment on Apollo and Spacechase, with Leeza Gibbons doing the interview. The segment included programmer Ed Salvo making a customized Spacechase for Gibbons, changing three shapes in the explosion graphic to her initials. When her ship was destroyed, Leeza's initials appeared.

== Reviews ==
The Atari Times, reviewed by Ethan C. Nobles, gave it a 75% rating.

neXGam (German), reviewed by Michael Tausendpfund, gave it a 63% rating.
