= Infiltration =

Infiltration may refer to:

== Science, medicine, and engineering ==
- Infiltration (hydrology), downward movement of water into soil
- Infiltration (HVAC), a heating, ventilation, and air conditioning term for air leakage into buildings
- Infiltration (medical), the diffusion or accumulation of substances or cells not normal to it or in amounts in excess of the normal
- Infiltration/Inflow, leakage of groundwater into sanitary sewers

== Art ==
- Infiltration (2017 film), a Canadian film
- Infiltration (2022 film), Russian war drama film
- "Infiltration" (Star Wars: The Bad Batch)

== Other uses ==
- Entryism, the infiltration by a political organisation of another, usually larger, organisation
- In espionage, using double agents to join an enemy organization
- Infiltration tactics, tactics developed by the German army in early 1915 that broke the trench-warfare stalemate on the western front
- Urban exploration, exploring parts of towns, etc. which are normally off-limits
- Infiltration (zine), a popular urban exploration zine/website created by Jeff Chapman (Ninjalicious)
- Seon-Woo Lee (born 1985), professional electronic sports players, specializing in fighting games, who plays under the alias Infiltration

== See also ==
- Infiltrator (disambiguation)
