= Wall-Defender =

1983 video game

- Developer: Onbase Co.
- Publisher: Bomb
- Platform: Atari 2600
- Release: UK: 1983; DE: 1983; NA: 1983
- Genre: Shoot'em up
- Mode: Single-player

Wall-Defender is a 1983 shoot 'em up for the Atari 2600. It was produced by Bomb, a label of developer Onbase Co. based out of Asia.

== Gameplay ==
Wall-Defender on Atari 2600

Wall-Defender is a single-player game in which the player defends a fortress comprising a series of walls against kamikaze attacks by aliens. The player controls a sprite that moves along the walls firing missiles at attackers. The outer wall may take ten attacks from ordinary attackers, though there are "super" attackers that can destroy a wall with a single hit. The colours of the walls change as they reduce in strength to indicate to the player that they are weakening, and after the seventh hit from an ordinary attacker they will begin to flash. If a wave of attackers is destroyed with none of them striking the player is given an extra wall. When a wall is about to fall the player must abandon it for an inner wall, otherwise they are destroyed and the game is over.

== Reception ==
In their 1983 review the UK magazine TV Gamer criticised the graphics but praised the novel concept of the game and described it as "an absorbing game which requires plenty of dexterity." The Australian magazine Score reviewed the game positively in their 1983 review, summing it up by saying that "for a single-theme game, Wall-Defender delivers what it promises". Computer and Video Games Magazine described the game as the most original of Bomb's releases.

Modern-day reviewers have also been positive about concept behind the game, with Retro Video Gamer describing it in their review as "surprising". Atari Times also described it as "highly addictive", and gave it a score of 95% overall.
