= Assault (1983 video game) =

- Cover art
- Publisher: Bomb
- Platform: Atari 2600
- Release: NA: 1983; UK: 1983; DE: 1983
- Genre: Fixed shooter
- Mode: Single-player

Assault is a 1983 fixed shooter video game developed and published by Bomb for the Atari 2600. Controlling a spaceship fixated at the bottom of the screen, gameplay involves shooting projectiles towards an enemy mothership that deploys smaller ships to attack the player. The player must also prevent enough projectiles from touching the bottom of the screen.

Assault was produced by Bomb, a video game developer based out of Asia. Upon release, It received mediocre reviews from critics, with many of them criticizing the graphics and referring to it as a ripoff of games such as Galaxian and Demon Attack. Some reviewers stated that despite being unoriginal, it was still fun to play, labeling it one of Bomb's better releases for the 2600.

== Gameplay ==
A screenshot depicting combat between the alien craft and the player's weapon

The player is presented with an alien mother ship, which continually deploys three smaller ships during gameplay. The mother ship and the smaller vessels fire at the weapon the player is in command of, and the goal is to eliminate the opposition while preventing the weapon from receiving enough shots to destroy it. The player uses a joystick to operate the game, and only one player at a time can play.

== Reception ==
Upon release, the game received a positive review from TV Gamer magazine, which described it as "all in all, a very good game" and as the best Bomb game. Computer and Video Games magazine also gave the game a positive review, praising the fact that it allowed both shooting directly up the screen as well as to the left and right. The German computing magazine TeleMatch gave the game 3/6 in its August/September 1983 edition, indicating a middling score. Videogaming Illustrated described it as "Demon Attack revisited".

Critical reception to the game by non-contemporary reviewers was mixed. Keita Iida marked the game as unoriginal and described the graphics as "drab visuals". He concluded by saying that the gameplay is unimaginative. He also said Assault is a ripoff of Galaxian, but opined that the game is better than some other Bomb products. "Classic Video Game Reviews" gave the game a B+ grade, saying it is a "little gem", and noting that though he did feel it is a ripoff of Phoenix or Demon Attack, it is fun and employs a good colour scheme. In Classic Home Video Games, 1972-1984: A Complete Reference Guide, this game is described as "repetitious, though fairly entertaining".
