= Victor Gustav Bloede (advertising) =

Victor Gustav Bloede III
- Born: January 31, 1920; Baltimore, Maryland
- Died: February 10, 1999 (aged 79); Boca Raton, Florida
- Education: University of Maryland
- Occupation: Advertising executive
- Employer: Benton & Bowles
- Spouse(s): Merle Huie (m. 1945; his death)
- Parent(s): Victor Gustav Bloede, II. Helen (née Yoe) Bloede

Victor Gustav Bloede III (31 January 1920 – 10 February 1999), was an advertising executive for Benton & Bowles who introduced the slogan Good to the last drop for Maxwell House coffee.

He married Merle Huie, daughter of Hulon William and Anna (née Lohn) Huie, on March 11, 1945. Merle was born in Brady, Texas, on May 4, 1921.
