= Benton & Bowles =

New York-based advertising agency

- Industry: Advertising
- Founded: 1929
- Founders: William Benton; Chester Bowles
- Defunct: 1985
- Headquarters: New York City, New York, United States

Benton & Bowles (B&B) was a New York–based advertising agency founded by William Benton and Chester Bowles in 1929. B&B was one of the first ad agencies in the United States and was frequently among the 10 largest. It merged with D'Arcy-MacManus Masius to become D'Arcy Masius Benton & Bowles in 1985 and continued business until a reorganization in 2002.

== History ==
The agency's success was closely related to the rise in popularity of radio. Benton & Bowles were among the agencies that invented the radio soap opera to promote their clients' products. By 1936 it was responsible for three of the four most popular radio programs on the air.

B&B's influence on soap opera continued from radio into the television era. In 1956, it and their client Procter & Gamble launched the nationally televised, long-running soap opera As the World Turns on CBS.

B&B created some of the most memorable commercials on television, including "Look, Ma, No Cavities" for Crest toothpaste and "When E.F. Hutton Talks, People Listen" for the New York brokerage house.

In 1981, they set up Telecom Entertainment as a subsidiary to handle production, which would handle $12–15 million per year, in order to develop television movies and miniseries, as well as pay-cable television shows, most notably book adaptations, and it will be handled by Michael Lepiner, who will serve as president of the Telecom Entertainment unit of the advertising agency.

Telecom Entertainment decided to separate from B&B in order to distribute products domestically and internationally by 1987 and to let Telecom expand their development slate for the 1987–88 season and expand direct distribution of its product.

Soon after, the Telecom Entertainment unit signed a pact with Yorkshire Television, the ITV franchisee, to co-produce and develop product for the global marketplace. The Telecom/Yorkshire pact involved co-productions involving international creative artists, stars and British crew and technical production expertise, and acquired the rights to four M.M. Kaye novels for his Death In book series, as well as The Attic: The Hiding of Anne Frank, for CBS and ITV.

Benton & Bowles merged with D'Arcy-MacManus Masius (D-MM) in 1985 to form D'Arcy Masius Benton & Bowles (DMB&B). The agency later merged with Leo Burnett Worldwide to form BCOM3, which was subsequently bought by Publicis Group in 2002. A subsequent reorganization by Publicis marked the end of the Benton & Bowles brand.

== Notable B&B creatives ==
- John V. Lyons Copywriter. He worked on Bounce using Whitney Houston as singing voice "For clothes you cant wait to jump into" Author of GUTS: Advertising from the Inside Out
- Russ Alben, ad executive
- Victor G. Bloede, former CEO who helped introduce the slogan "Good to the last drop" for Maxwell House coffee. Bloede was hired as a copywriter in 1950 and rose quickly, becoming a vice president in 1955 and eventually being named president and chief executive in 1968. He was the first and only creative executive to run Benton.
- Irwin Gotlieb, Global CEO of GroupM
- Nina Lawrence, publisher of W magazine.
- Shepherd Mead joined B&B in 1936 as a mail-room clerk. He worked his way up to a vice-presidency by the time he left in 1956 to pursue a full-time writing career. His most famous book, How to Succeed in Business Without Really Trying, published in 1952, satirizes his corporate experiences at the agency. Written in his spare time—before work and on weekends—the book was a best-seller, and in 1961 it was adapted into a hit Broadway musical, with songs by Frank Loesser and a libretto by Abe Burrows, which in turn became a movie in 1967.
- Howard Stern worked as an assistant media planner for B&B in 1976 before launching a successful radio career.
- Dick Wolf, American television producer best known as creator and executive producer of both the Law & Order and the Chicago franchise, worked as an advertising copywriter for B&B early in his career.
- In 1954, Freddie Bartholomew began working B&B as a television producer and director. At B&B, he produced shows, such as The Andy Griffith Show, and produced or directed several television soap operas, including As the World Turns, The Edge of Night and Search for Tomorrow. In 1964, he became vice president of radio and television at the company.
