= List of best-selling Atari 2600 video games =

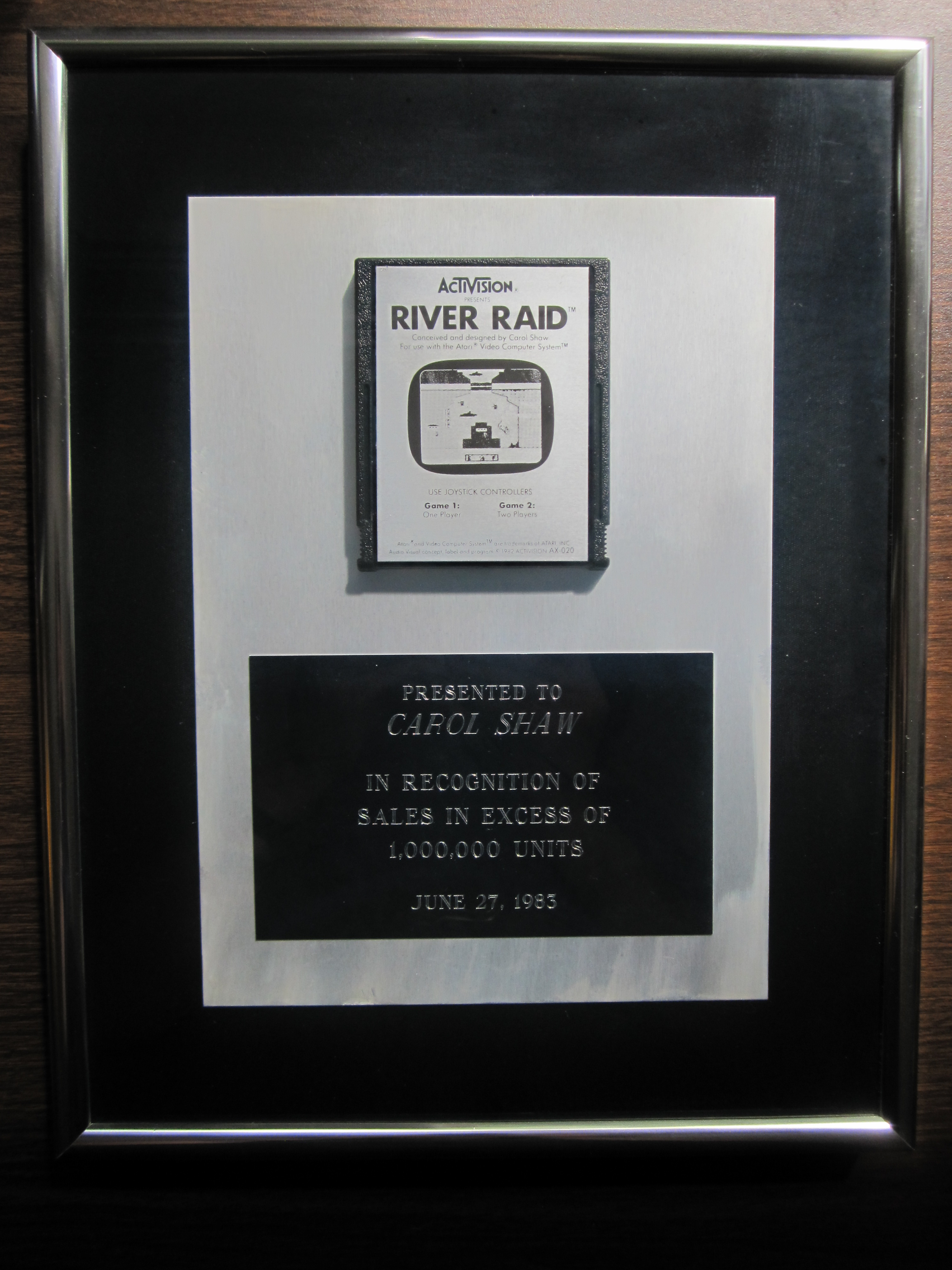
An award plaque for River Raid selling over one-million copies for Activision given to Carol Shaw

The Atari 2600 (previously known as the Atari VCS) was the most successful home system of its generation, and it was home to many popular games that sold millions of copies (a figure unheard of before). The best-selling video game on the console is Pac-Man, a port of the arcade game of the same name programmed by Tod Frye. Originally created by Toru Iwatani and released in 1980, Pac-Man was later ported to many home video game consoles, beginning with the Atari 2600 in 1982. Within months it became the best-selling home video game of all time, with more than 1.5 million units pre-ordered by customers before its release. Pac-Man went on to sell over 8 million units worldwide.

The second best-selling Atari 2600 game is Space Invaders, a port of the 1978 Taito arcade video game that was programmed by Rick Maurer, which was released in 1980 and became the first video game to sell a million copies. It went on to sell over 6 million copies, was the best-selling game on the system (until Pac-Man), and is credited with increasing the VCS’s sales and popularity.

At least 24 video games released on the Atari 2600 sold at least one million copies, of which 14 were developed and/or published by the console's manufacturer, Atari, Inc. Other publishers with multiple entries in the top 24 are Activision (six titles) and Imagic (three titles). Three of the games in the top 24 were programmed by David Crane, three by Howard Scott Warshaw, three by Rob Fulop, and two by Bradley G. Stewart.

== Video games ==
List of best-selling video games on the Atari 2600
Title	Developer / Publisher	Arcade port	Licensor	Programmer(s)	Release date	Sales	Ref.
Pac-Man	Atari, Inc.	Yes	Namco	Tod Frye	March 16, 1982	8,095,586	(Note: 7,271,844 in 1982. 684,569 in 1983. 37,063 in 1986. 61,685 in 1987. 3,885 in 1988. 34,374 in 1989. 2,166 in 1990.)
Space Invaders	Atari, Inc.	Yes	Taito	Rick Maurer	March 1980	6,252,229	(Note: 1,318,655 in 1980. 2,964,137 in 1981. 1,373,033 in 1982. 435,353 in 1983. 17,523 in 1986. 65,148 in 1987. 29,717 in 1988. 36,308 in 1989. 12,355 in 1990.)
Donkey Kong	Coleco (Note: Published by Atari Corporation from 1987)	Yes	Nintendo	Garry Kitchen	July 1982	4,000,000	
Pitfall!	Activision	No	—N/a	David Crane	April 20, 1982	4,000,000	
Asteroids	Atari, Inc.	Yes	—N/a	Bradley G. Stewart	July 1981	3,832,886	(Note: 3.8 million up until 1982. 7,503 in 1986. 8,558 in 1987. 12,120 in 1988. 11,558 in 1989. 4,705 in 1990.)
Defender	Atari, Inc.	Yes	Williams Electronics	Bob Polaro	June 1982	3,040,684	(Note: 3,006,790 in 1982 (with at least 68,993 returned in 1983). 2,298 in 1986. 6,160 in 1987. 24,741 in 1988. 695 in 1989.)
E.T. the Extra-Terrestrial	Atari, Inc.	No	Universal Pictures	Howard Scott Warshaw	December 1982	2,740,232	(Note: 2,637,985 in 1982 (with at least 669,733 returned in 1983). 1,138 in 1986. 88,338 in 1987. 3,131 in 1988. 9,586 in 1989. 54 in 1990.)
Ms. Pac-Man	Atari, Inc.	Yes	Midway Manufacturing	Mike Horowitz, Josh Littlefield	February 1983	2,311,428	(Note: 1,963,078 in 1983. 35,719 in 1986. 138,400 in 1987. 125,266 in 1988. 38,597 in 1989. 10,368 in 1990.)
Demon Attack	Imagic	No	—N/a	Rob Fulop	March 1982	2,000,000	
Night Driver	Atari, Inc.	Yes	—N/a	Rob Fulop	June 1980	1,990,643	(Note: 161,352 in 1980. 779,547 in 1981. 457,058 in 1982. 580,959 in 1983. 84 in 1986. 7,227 in 1987. 4,416 in 1988.)
Berzerk	Atari, Inc.	Yes	Stern	Dan Hitchens	August 1982	1,870,642	(Note: 1,798,773 in 1982 (with at least 20,314 returned in 1983). 2,046 in 1986. 54,444 in 1987. 15,170 in 1988. 209 in 1989.)
Centipede	Atari, Inc.	Yes	—N/a	Douglas B. Macrae, Josh Littlefield	March 1982	1,815,661	(Note: 1,475,240 in 1982. 49,774 in 1986. 150,572 in 1987. 107,168 in 1988. 21,973 in 1989. 10,934 in 1990.)
Warlords	Atari, Inc.	Yes	—N/a	Carla Meninsky	May 1981	1,788,462	(Note: 936,861 in 1981. 420,924 in 1982. 372,454 in 1983. 11,412 in 1986. 6,370 in 1987. 38,504 in 1988. 1,865 in 1989. 72 in 1990.)
Breakout	Atari, Inc.	Yes	—N/a	Bradley G. Stewart	November 1978	1,678,965	(Note: 256,265 in 1980. 838,635 in 1981. 242,764 in 1982. 312,672 in 1983. 7,060 in 1986. 1,680 in 1987. 19,889 in 1988.)
Adventure	Atari, Inc.	No	—N/a	Warren Robinett	March 1980	1,000,000	
Laser Blast	Activision	No	—N/a	David Crane	March 1981	1,000,000	
Freeway	Activision	No	—N/a	David Crane	July 1981	1,000,000	
Kaboom!	Activision	No	—N/a	Larry Kaplan	July 1981	1,000,000	
Yars' Revenge	Atari, Inc.	No	—N/a	Howard Scott Warshaw	May 1982	1,000,000	
Atlantis	Imagic	No	—N/a	Dennis Koble	July 1982	1,000,000	
Cosmic Ark	Imagic	No	—N/a	Rob Fulop	August 1982	1,000,000	
Megamania	Activision	No	—N/a	Steve Cartwright	October 1982	1,000,000	
Raiders of the Lost Ark	Atari, Inc.	No	Lucasfilm	Howard Scott Warshaw	November 1982	1,000,000	
River Raid	Activision	No	—N/a	Carol Shaw	December 1982	1,000,000	

== See also ==
- List of best-selling video games
