= Atlantis (video game) =

1982 video game

- Atari 2600 cover art
- Developer: Imagic
- Publisher: Imagic
- Designers: Atari 2600; Dennis Koble; Intellivision; Pat Ransil
- Platforms: Atari 2600, Intellivision, Magnavox Odyssey 2, VIC-20, Atari 8-bit computers
- Release: August 1982: Atari 2600; August 1982; Intellivision; October 1982; Odyssey 2; May 1983; VIC-20; May 1983
- Genre: Shoot 'em up
- Modes: Single-player, multiplayer

Atlantis is a fixed shooter video game released by Imagic in August 1982 for the Atari 2600. The game is set in the fabled city of Atlantis where the cities are under attack by invading Gorgon vessels that plan to destroy the city. The player controls sentries to fire a counter attack.

The game was designed by Dennis Koble. In comparison to his previous game Trick Shot, which he described as giving him anxiety, Koble said the development of Atlantis was a more positive experience. Atlantis was ported to the Atari 8-bit computers, VIC-20, Intellivision, and Magnavox Odyssey 2. While the VIC-20 and Odyssey 2 versions are similar to the original, the Intellivision version by Pat Ransil adds several new elements of gameplay.

Atlantis was a financial success for Imagic, being the second highest-grossing game for the company after Demon Attack (1982). A follow-up titled Atlantis II was given as a grand prize for winners of a video game competition, which featured the same general gameplay, but with higher difficulty.

Atlantis and its various ports received positive reviews from video game publications such as The Video Game Update, Video Games and The Logical Gamer. The game received a "Certificate of Merit", as a runner-up in the "Video Game of the Year" category from Video magazine in 1983.

== Gameplay ==
Gameplay of Atlantis on the Atari 2600. The Acropolis Command Post is in the center, with the two sentries situated on the left and right sides of the screen.

The game is set in the fabled city of Atlantis, a place with major city districts. One day, an ominous sound is heard in the sea surrounding the city that is the Gorgon Fleet. These fierce warriors intend to demolish the city.

The goal of the game is to defend Atlantis from the Gorgons vessels before they destroy it with their death rays. The player can fire at the invading Gorgon sentry vessels from either the Acropolis Command Post or the sentry posts on each side of the screen. The smaller, faster ships are worth more points.

The Gorgon fleet attacks in waves. At the end of every wave, the player receives points for each part of Atlantis that is not destroyed. For every 10,000 points, a destroyed part of Atlantis is restored at the end of a wave. Points are gained for shooting vessels. The smaller ships are worth a higher total and shooting them with the sentries earns more points.

Each city in the game has a force field that protects it and is powered by the Acropolis post. In some game modes, the Acropolis post is disabled. Other game modes adjust whether the next wave of enemies are faster, or offer a two-player mode where the left joystick fires and the left and right joystick control each sentry respectively.

== Development ==
Atlantis was designed and coded by Denis Koble. It was created for Imagic, a company made from ex-Atari and Mattel employees in 1981. Prior to creating Atlantis, Koble made Trick Shot for the company, a game he said gave him anxiety attacks as he had difficulty getting the physics correct. Atlantis comparatively was described by Koble "a pleasure to work on and we were a very cohesive team [...] I have lots of positive memories".

For the theme, Koble said he wanted to do a game themed around Atlantis for a long time and knew exactly what he desired it to be and that the game "turned out to be 95 percent of what I imagined". When asked about influences for the game, Koble said he was a huge fan of the Atari game Missile Command (1980) and stated: "I'm sure it inspired me but not consciously". Koble credited Bob Smith for a coding technique which allowed for more moving objects on screen than the Atari 2600 hardware had originally intended.

=== Ports ===
The ports of the game vary from one another. The Atari 8-bit computers version designed by Jeff Ronnie plays similar to the Atari 2600 game. The VIC-20 version has only two-outer bases with enemy attacks changing to compensate. The Magnavox Odyssey 2 version is pared-down with only five parts of the city to defend with.

The Intellivision game was different from the original. It uses crosshairs and features launchable pods to fight enemies. Further additions a looping day to night time cycle, that affects gameplay by having the player have to use searchlights to spot enemies. Unlike the Atari 2600 version, the Intellivision version does not allow for simultaneous two-player game, and only allows two players to play on alternating turns. This version of Atlantis was designed and programmed by Pat Ransil, the Senior Systems Engineer at Imagic. He joined Imagic after Brian Dougherty, his former classmate at the University of California, invited him to join the company. Discussing his philosophy on game design, Ransil said he was more fond of games that require quick-reaction than complicated strategy, saying that his version of Atlantis "depends on your ability to react fast and manipulate the controls accordingly. You have to act now! That's the type of game I like."

Some unique elements in his game, such as the lighting in the sky was the idea of Mike Becker, one of the graphics specialists at Imagic. The Odyssey 2 version was designed by Jeff Ronne with some graphics assistance from Becker.

== Release ==
Atlantis was released in August 1982 for the Atari 2600 and for the Intellivision in October 1982. The Odyssey 2 and VIC-20 versions were released in May 1983. Along with Demon Attack, it was the only third-party games released for the Odyssey 2 in the United States.

Atlantis was a financial success for Imagic, being the second highest-grossing game for the company after Demon Attack (1982). Koble recalled that it sold two million copies.

=== Atlantis II competition ===
A competition was held in 1982 which led to a trip to Bermuda for the top four high scorers of the game. Koble later recalled that the players could "pretty much play indefinitely", leading him to create a harder version of the game called Atlantis II. The contest winners would receive this version of the game which features the same cover and cartridge art as Atlantis, but with a white sticker on the box labeled Atlantis II. The game features faster enemy ships that are worth fewer points.

== Reception ==
Reception

Review scores
Publication	Score	
Publication	Atari 2600	Intellivision
AllGame	3/5	4.5/5
Arcade Express	9/10	
Electronic Games 1983 Software Encyclopedia	9/10	9/10
Electronic Games 1984 Software Encyclopedia	6/10	9/10
JoyStik	4/5	
Video Review	2/4	

Reviewing the Atari 2600 game, a reviewer in The Video Game Update stated that along with Cosmic Ark, the two Imagic games featured arcade-quality graphics and original gameplay which they declared to be "quite refreshing in this day of so many copy-cat games". Arnie Katz and Bill Kunkel of Electronic Games, an anonymous reviewer in JoyStik and Suzan D. Prince in Video Review complimented the graphics in the Atari 2600 version, with JoyStik finding the gameplay appropriately challenging. Prince said the game was too easy, even on its most difficult setting.

Reviewing the Intellvision version, Phil Liswell of Video Games said that Imagic had enhanced the original game just as they had done with Demon Attack, declaring it a great shoot-'em-up for the system. In a review in The Logical Gamer, its reviewers found that the Odyssey 2 version lacked the crisper graphics of the Atari 2600 version, but was far superior to anything produced for the system.

In 1983, at the Fourth Annual Arcade Awards, along with Starmaster (1982), the Atari 2600 version of Atlantis won a "Certificate of Merit" in the "Videogame of the Year" category. Demon Attack (1982) won the main award.

From retrospective reviews, David Crookes wrote in Retro Gamer that Atlantis was a defining game from Imagic which cemented its reputation as a talented third-party developer. Brett Alan Weiss of the online game database AllGame praised the Atari 2600 version for its sound and graphics and while finding it fun, wrote that it lacked the speed, freedom of movement and the varied amount of strategies offered in Missile Command. Jonathan Sutyak of AllGame reviewed the Intellivision version, calling it a "fantastic cartridge with a good amount of variety". The review said the release would be "near-perfect" and only lamented that it featured an alternating two-player option instead of the cooperative version. In his book The 100 Greatest Console Video Games 1977-1987 (2014), Weiss said the Intellivision version of the game was superior to Atari 2600 original. He included the game in his list of 100 games, saying that with its high quality graphics and deep gameplay, "Atlantis exudes quality."

== Legacy ==
Atlantis features an end sequence where survivors of the devastated city escape in a giant spaceship. Koble said that was supposed to be the "Cosmic Ark" which was the title of Rob Fulop's follow-up to Demon Attack called Cosmic Ark (1982). Koble said that during development of both games, him and Fulop tossed around the idea of the survivors from Atlantis appearing in Cosmic Ark. The manual proposed that Cosmic Ark was a follow-up, stating "Can the Cosmic Ark repopulate the ocean metropolis? The saga continues."

Imagic closed its office in 1986. Koble continued in the industry working on games such as Sonic Spinball and the PGA Tour Golf series. Koble would work the director of software at Electronic Arts, and later as the vice president of technology at Universal Studios, the chief operating officer of Mineshaft Entertainment and the owner of Illogical Software where he was a consultant to the videogame industry.

== See also ==
- Atlantis in popular culture
- List of Intellivision games
