= Space Invaders (Atari 8-bit video game) =

1980 video game

- Developer: Atari, Inc.
- Publishers: Atari, Inc.
- Producer: Brenda Laurel
- Designer: Rob Fulop
- Series: Space Invaders
- Platform: Atari 8-bit
- Release: 1980
- Modes: Single-player, multiplayer

Space Invaders is a 1980 video game developed and published by Atari for the Atari 400 and 800 line of home computers. Based on Taito's 1978 arcade video game of the same name, the game was ported to Atari's computers by Rob Fulop. Similar to the arcade game, the player operates a laser cannon to shoot incoming enemies from outer space. The game features unique graphics and gameplay differences from the original.

After Atari obtained the home distribution rights from Taito, Fulop chose Space Invaders as his next project. He had just finished a video game port of Night Driver for the Atari Video Computer System and wanted to make a more unique game. This led him to make variations to Space Invaders' original design. Atari released the game in cassette and cartridge formats.

The game received positive reviews in magazines Personal Computers & Games, Electronic Games and Softline. While the gameplay was a consistent point of praise, reviewers were split about the deviations from the original. Based on critiques from within Atari, Fulop aimed make his next port, an Atari 2600 version of Missile Command, closer to the original arcade game.

== Gameplay ==
Gameplay from Space Invaders for the Atari 8-bit computer line. This version features unique designs and gameplay elements such as the rocket ship on the left side of the playfield.

Space Invaders is set on the moon, where the player must prevent the titular alien invaders from landing on the surface. The goal is to score as many points as possible by shooting the aliens with a laser cannon that the player can move horizontally along the moon's surface. Each round features 48 aliens who emerge from a rocket ship on the left side of the screen. Once shot, their rocket ship lowers, allowing the aliens to get closer to the moon's surface. While attacking, the player must maneuver the laser cannon to dodge the invaders' beam attacks, which takes a player character game life upon contact. Once the player has depleted all the game lives, the game continues until the invaders reach the bottom of the playfield.

Among the changes from the original game, after shooting every invader in a wave, the rocket ship descends slightly lower each round, with columns of invaders emerging from different levels within the craft. The invader's ship on the left side of the screen lowers every subsequent round. When it reaches the bottom of the playing field, the game displays a scene with a flashing red Mystery Ship arriving and carrying off the laser base. The game removes the defense bunkers from the original game, giving the player the ability to auto-fire at enemies. Variations in play adjust the speed of enemy fire, the number of lives the player starts with, and the ability for the enemies to shoot bombs diagonally or straight.

== Development ==
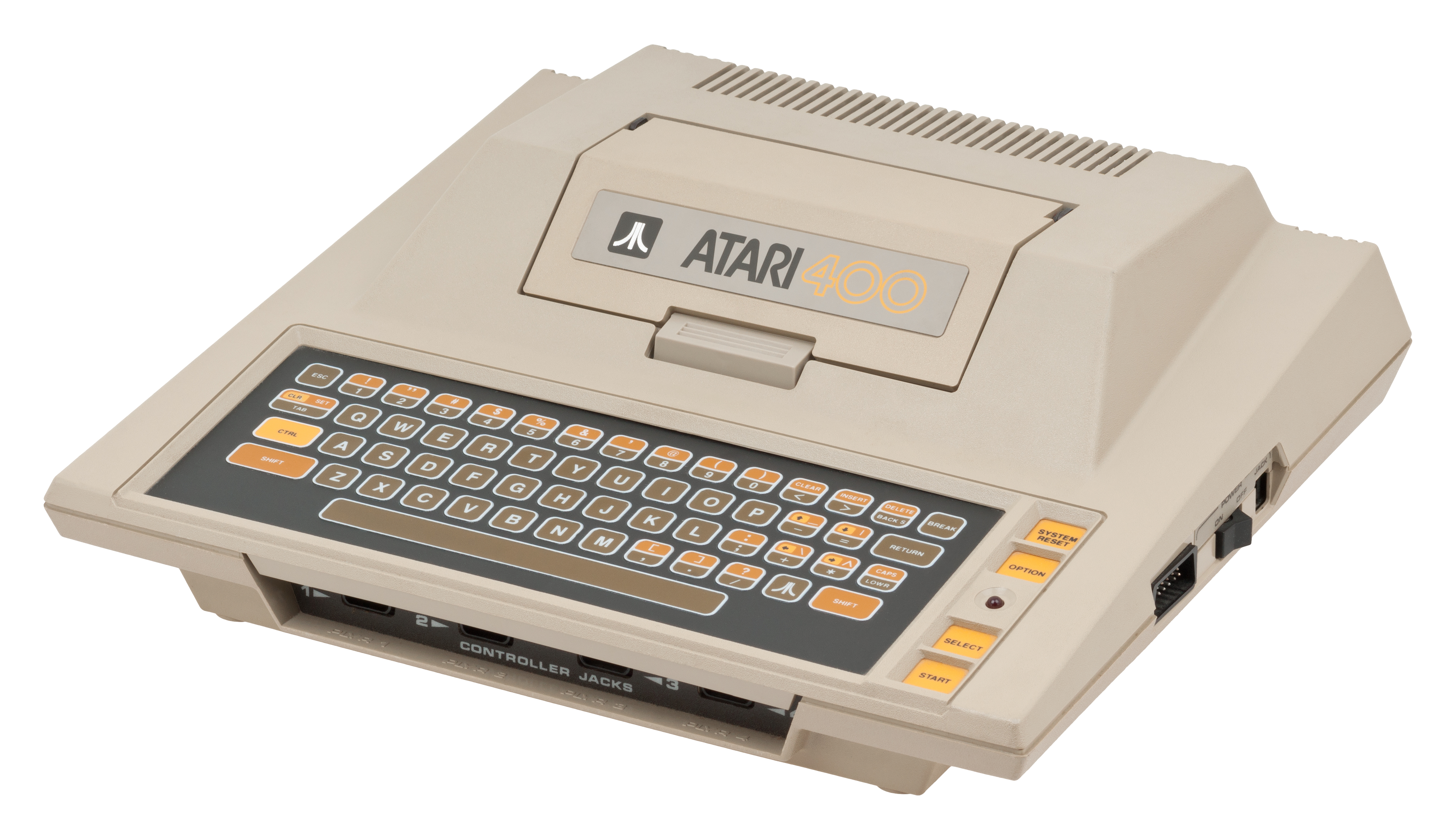
Atari 400

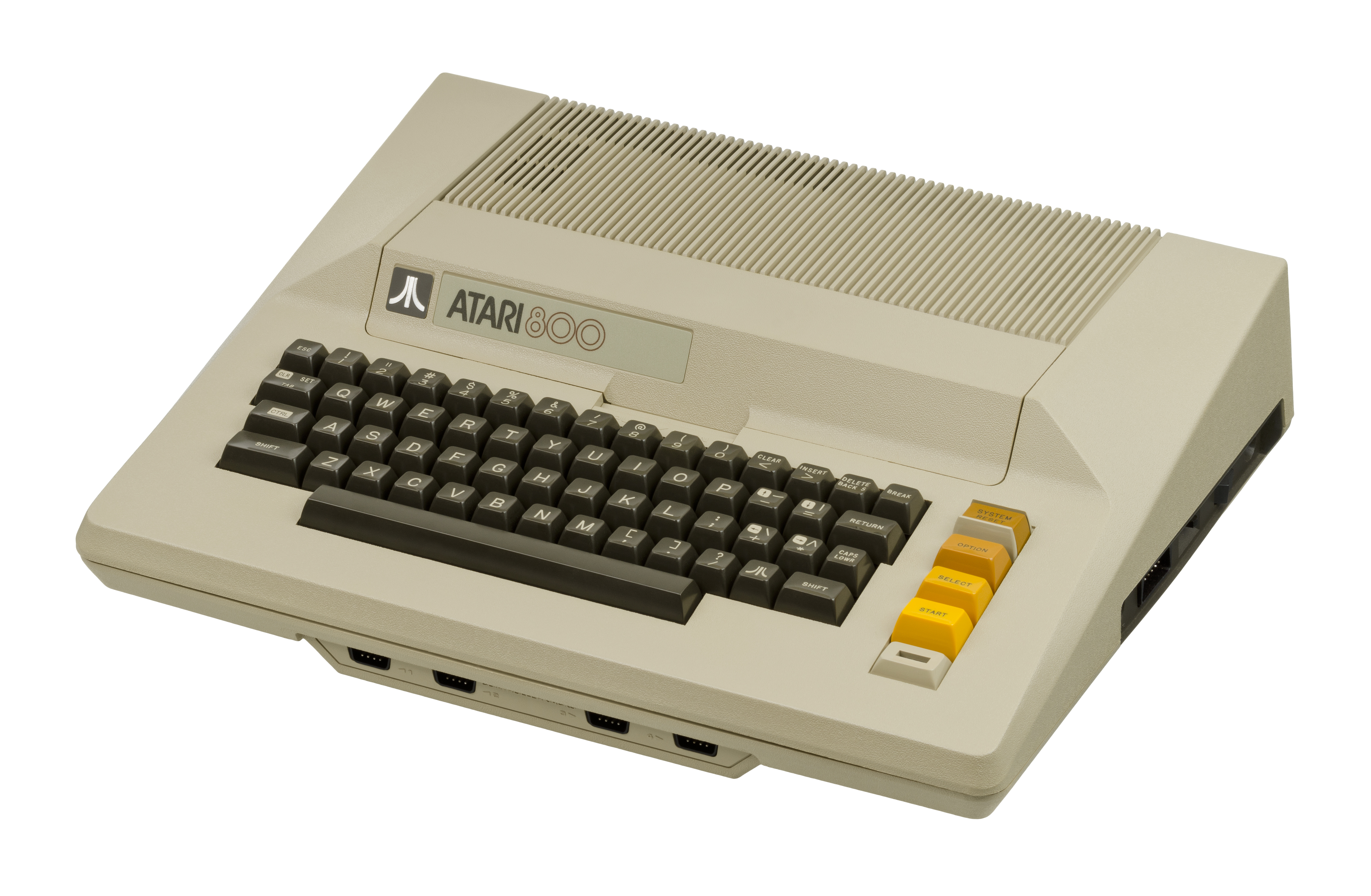
Atari 800

Rob Fulop ported Space Invaders to Atari's line of 8-bit home computers.

The original arcade version of Space Invaders was programmed by Toshihiro Nishikado for Taito in 1978. Midway arranged to distribute the game in the United States following its success in Japan. By January 1979, Atari, Inc. had obtained the license from Taito to develop home versions of Space Invaders. Rob Fulop, who had joined Atari in 1978, designed and programmed a new version of Space Invaders for Atari 8-bit computers. Brenda Laurel was a producer for the game, as the lead of the team of strategists who worked with the programmers on Atari 400/800 games for this and other arcade ports. At the time, Atari's programmers had creative freedom and did not have to submit their design plans for approval. Fulop chose to develop a version of the popular arcade game. He had seen Rick Maurer's Atari 2600 port of Space Invaders and was very impressed; Fulop considered it a programming feat to animate that many characters and create that many game variations.

The game features gameplay and graphics different from the source material. Changes include a spaceship on the left side of the playfield, new character designs for the invaders, and a new scoring system. Reflecting on the changes he made, Fulop called his reasoning "very simple and somewhat embarrassing." After developing a video game port of Night Driver (1980) for the Atari 2600, he felt he was "far too cool to do another straight port of an existing coin-op game." Fulop programmed Space Invaders in machine language. At the time of development, Atari developers had their own computer terminal to write code. Fulop created the graphics first on graph paper and then converted each line of drawn pixels into corresponding hexadecimal data that he coded into the program. During this period in Atari's history, the company did not credit game designers. However, Fulop hid his initials within the game. When the spaceship on the left side of the screen reaches the bottom of the playfield, two of the very lowest aliens turn into letters R.F.

== Release and reception ==
Retrospective reviews

Review score
Publication	Score
Electronic Games 1983 Software Encyclopedia	8/10

Space Invaders was released for Atari 400/800 computers in 1980. Atari first released the game in cassette format and later followed it with a ROM cartridge version. While sources such as Electronic Games have described Atari's later Atari 5200 release of Space Invaders as very similar to the Atari 400/800 version of the game, it features further deviations in gameplay to other earlier official releases of the game.

Readers of Electronic Games voted Space Invaders the second "most popular computer game" in May 1982. In the Electronic Games 1983 Software Encyclopedia, the publication complimented the game for excelling gameplay while finding its graphics and sound and enjoyment as a one-player game to be merely "good". Writing for Softline magazine, Phillip Good praised the varity of game options and felt they provided good replay value for a reasonable price. However, he commented that the game is too demanding for younger players and cautioned beginners against starting with the more challenging variations. In Personal Computers & Games (1983), a review found this version of Space Invaders as not very true to the original game, recommending Roklan's Deluxe Invaders for an experience more attuned to the Taito's arcade game.

Fulop said that after completing the game, a member of the Atari marketing staff and other people who played it questioned him on why it was not more like the arcade version of the game. Fulop felt his inexperience as a young designer led him to create his version of the game, as well as saying that Atari's management should have some peer reviews, as he was still a young game designer. He opted to make his next game, the Atari 2600 version of Missile Command as faithful to the original arcade game as he could.

== See also ==
- List of Atari, Inc. games (1972–1984)
