= Datsun 280 =

Datsun 280 may refer to:

- Datsun 280C, sedan car produced between 1979 and 1983
- Datsun 280Z, coupé produced between 1975 and 1978
- Datsun 280ZX, coupé produced between 1978 and 1983
- Datsun 280 ZZZAP, 1976 arcade game
