= Mindset (computer) =

1984 personal computer

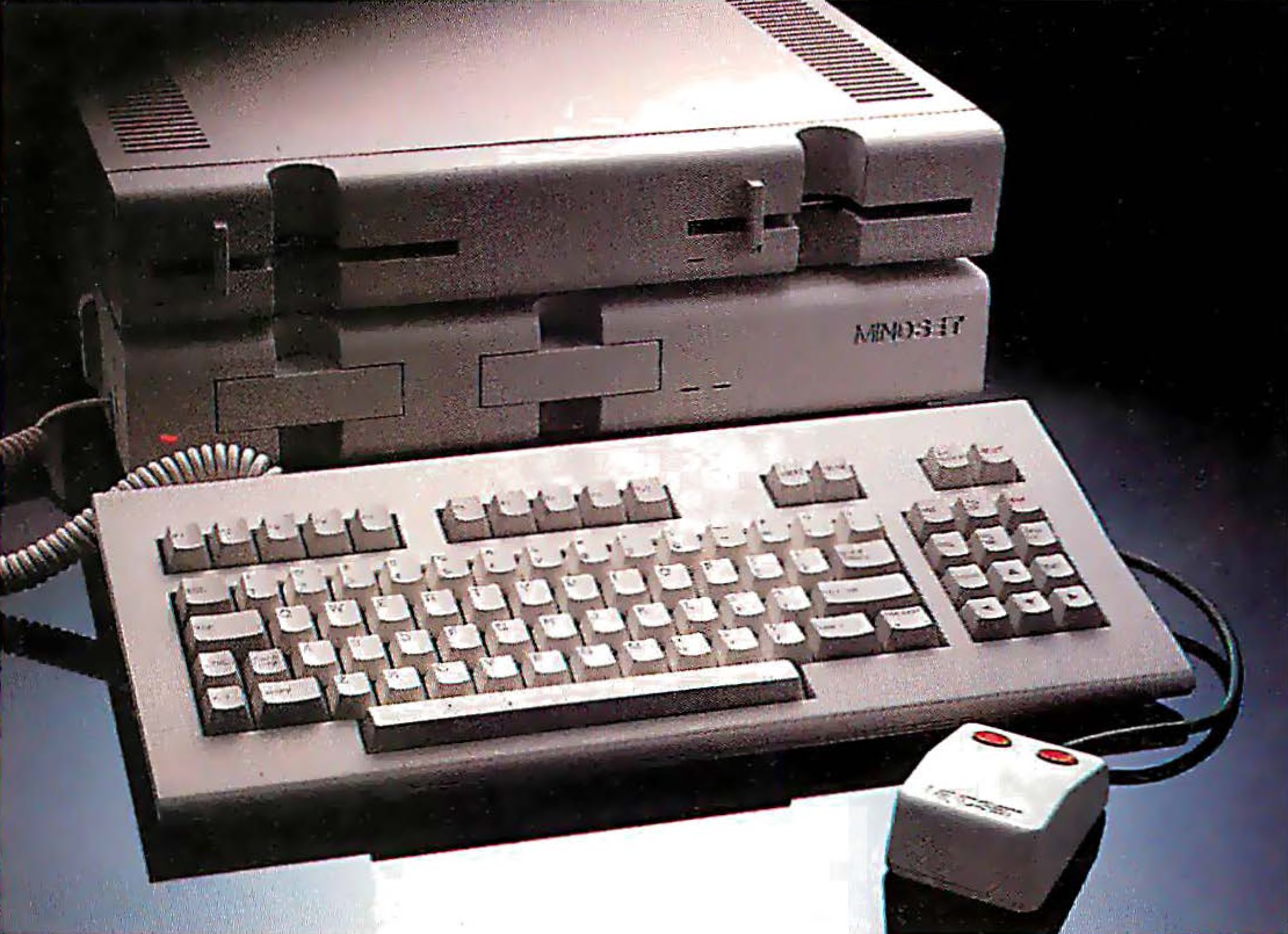
- Developer: Mindset Corporation
- Manufacturer: Mindset Corporation
- Type: Personal computer
- Released: 2 May 1984
- Lifespan: 1985
- Introductory price: US$1,798 (equivalent to $5,600 in 2025)
- Operating system: MS-DOS
- CPU: Intel 80186 @ 6 MHz
- Memory: 32 KB, 128 KB, or 256 KB RAM; 32 KB VRAM; 32 KB ROM
- Removable storage: Cartridges
- Display: Composite, RGB
- Graphics: Custom VLSI; 320×200 with 16 colors 640×400 with 2 colors 512 color palette

The Mindset is an Intel 80186-based MS-DOS personal computer. It was developed by the Mindset Corporation and released in spring 1984. Unlike other IBM PC compatibles of the time, it has custom graphics hardware supporting a 320×200 resolution with 16 simultaneous colors (chosen from a 512-shade palette) and hardware-accelerated drawing capabilities, including a blitter, allowing it to update the screen 50 times as fast as an IBM standard color graphics adapter. The basic unit was priced at US$1,798 (equivalent to $5,570 in 2025). It is conceptually similar to the more successful Amiga released over a year later. Key engineers of both the Amiga and Mindset were ex-Atari, Inc. employees.

The system didn't sell well and was only on the market for about a year. This was lamented by industry commenters, who saw compatibility taking precedence over innovation. Its distinctive case remains in the permanent collection of the Museum of Modern Art in New York.

== History ==
Roger Badertscher was head of Atari, Inc.'s Home Computer Division until 1982 when he resigned in order to set up a new company to produce a new personal computer. As president of Mindset Corporation, he brought a number of Atari engineers with him.

=== Design ===
In most computer systems of the era, the CPU is used to create graphics by drawing bit patterns directly into memory. Separate hardware then reads these patterns and produces the actual video signal for the display. The Mindset added a new custom-designed VLSI vector processor to handle many common drawing tasks, like lines or filling areas. Instead of the CPU doing all of this work by changing memory directly, in the Mindset the CPU sets up those instructions and then hands off the actual bit fiddling to the separate processor.

Badertscher compared the chipset to the Intel 8087 floating-point processor, running alongside the Intel 80186 on which the machine is based. There are a number of parallels between the Mindset and the Amiga 1000, another computer designed by ex-Atari engineers that offered advanced graphics.

The Mindset's look was designed by Robert Brunner who would go on to provide design and direction for all Apple product lines from 1989 to ’97. His distinctive case for the Mindset is included by the Museum of Modern Art, New York, in its permanent collection.

As development continued and it became clear that the machine would be ready before the MS-DOS-based Microsoft Windows 1.0 was, Bill Gates became personally involved in the project to assist Mindset in emulating IBM character graphics without losing performance. Once Mindset officials determined that most of the desirable software was compatible, development was frozen and the OS burned to ROM in late 1983. The ROM does not run about 20% of the PC software base, including Microsoft Flight Simulator. WordStar is one of the PC applications reported to run, and Mindset publicized a list of 60 applications that run unmodified. The software base was expected to increase dramatically once a final version of Windows was released.

Before its release, in early 1984 Jack Tramiel is rumored to have tried to buy Mindset's technology. before ultimately buying Atari and designing a new machine from off-the-shelf parts, the Atari ST.

=== Release ===
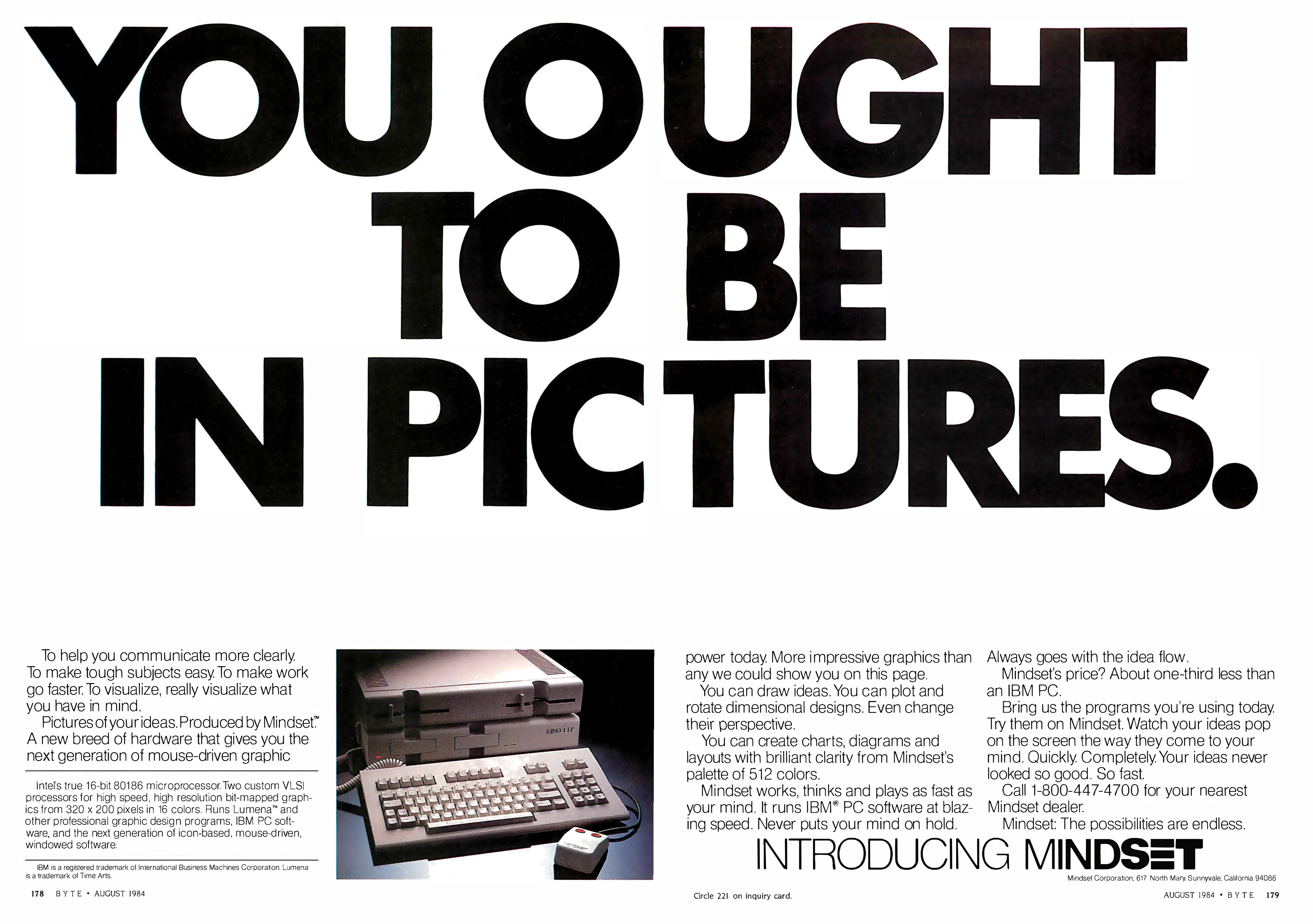
Advertisement from the August 1984 issue of Byte magazine

The Mindset was released on 2 May 1984. The base model with 64 KB RAM (32 KB user RAM, 32 KB VRAM) and no floppy-disk drive sold for US$1,099, a 128 KB (user RAM) model with single disk was available for $1,798, and a 256 KB (user RAM) dual-disk version cost $2,398. The disk-less version of the machine was still usable, as the system also included two ROM cartridge ports on the front of the machine that could be used for the operating system and another program. The canonical cartridge is an extended version of GW-BASIC. The machine is packaged in a unique enclosure designed by GVO of Menlo Park, visually separated into two sections with the ROM slots in the lower half and the optional diskettes on the upper half. It was sold complete with a custom nylon carrying case.

Mindset's president said its graphics capabilities were unmatched except on US$50,000 workstations. At the time it garnered critical acclaim, with reviewers universally praising its graphics and overall performance which was much faster than contemporary PCs. although in many cases with the caveat that the market was rapidly standardizing.

=== Disappearance ===
By the summer of 1984, it was clear the system was not selling as expected, and the company re-purposed it for the video production and graphics design markets. That was followed in August by a round of layoffs, and another in January 1985, this time half the employees were let go. The company filed for Chapter 11 protection on 28 August 1985, and never emerged.

By 1985, when it was clear the system was not living up to its promise and Windows 1.0 was a flop in general, John J. Anderson published a review of the system decrying that the personal computer market was beginning to value compatibility over technology. He wrote:

...the marketplace has "matured," and in its maturation process it has lost much of its original spark, innovation, and imagination. Today supposed graphics "experts" think of graphics in terms of when to use a pie chart as opposed to a bar chart. Today a program like City had better run on the Commodore 64, or else be capable of charting the cost of equity capital. Today the idea of designing machines that push the envelope of graphics price/performance has caved in to the design of machines that are compatible but cheaper. It is a shift in emphasis that makes the micro world a colder place for those who are motivated enough to seek something more.

=== Models ===
There were several variants of Mindset offered. The M-1001 was the original machine. It offered TTL RGB or composite graphics, but did not do genlocking, despite having an 'Ext Sync' port on the back, which Mindset explained was for future use. The M-1001-S, or Professional Graphics System, was essentially an M-1001 with an analog RGB port instead of TTL, allowing access to more of the Mindset's color palette, and the ability to work with separate-sync monitors. The M-1001-V, or Video Production System (VPS), had a daughterboard added that allowed a user to genlock to a video source and add graphics or titles to a composite video source that in turn was recorded to a VCR. The M-1001-VS, or Professional Video Graphics System (PVGS), was otherwise the same as the VPS, but featured an analog RGB output instead of TTL. Shortly before the company went bankrupt, it released a grey-colored, rackmounted machine dubbed the M3000, that bore little physical resemblance to the original machines, but had an internal SCSI hard drive and was intended for professional video use.

==== Mindset II ====
The "Mindset II" computer was released in January of 1986; a badge engineered version of the M-1001, with an adhesive label designating "II" under the embossed name. Internally, the motherboard is essentially the same as the M-1001, with system RAM removed to a separate cartridge. Its enhanced functionality is not totally understood – but from the "Mindset II Advanced Professional Videographics System" user's guide it makes mention of "Chaining" two Mindset's:

It is possible to genlock any Mindset System to a Mindset II. In such a case, the composite video output of one Mindset is used as an external video source for the Video Production Module connected to the Mindset II. It is very important that the Mindset System being used as a video source be set in the interlaced mode. Otherwise, vertical locking will not occur.

The Mindset II is referred to on the front of the user guide as Model# M1500, however other internal pages reference is an M1000-II and also make mention of Mindset Video Production Module Model# M1011. The system included 512 KB system RAM (which was installed in a separate Mindset memory expansion cartridge body, which had a label warning users that the Mindset II could not operate without it installed), 128 KB VRAM, and 40 KB ROM. The primary resolution was 640x400, 4-color, double-buffered. The Mindset II also featured an analog RGB video port, instead of TTL. A revised dual disk expansion unit was also offered which was otherwise the same as the original except with no additional system RAM installed inside, as the system was already maxed out at 512KB.

== Description ==
The system architecture is based on the Intel 80186, with proprietary VLSI chips that enhance and speed up the graphics. These capabilities make achieving full IBM compatibility more difficult than its competitors. Bill Gates became involved with development, assisting Mindset in emulating IBM character graphics without losing performance. Once Mindset officials determined that most of the desirable software was compatible, development was frozen and the operating system burned to ROM, which locked out 20% of the IBM PC software base, including Microsoft Flight Simulator. WordStar is one of the applications reported to run, and Mindset publicized a list of 60 applications that run unmodified. The software base was expected to increase dramatically once a final version of Windows was released.

Mindset's design is modular in many aspects. The top of the case has an opening to access its system bus; this allows for the expansion module to plug into the main computer module to add memory and one or two disk drives. The Mindset was designed by several ex-Atari engineers like the Amiga 1000, another computer of the era with an advanced graphics subsystem and modular expandability. Jack Tramiel (forming Tramel Technology, Ltd.) tried to buy Mindset's technology in Spring of 1984.

A dual 5.25-inch floppy drive module that sits above the main unit was available and part of the common sales configuration for the system. The module also includes 224 KB of expansion memory as well.

Mindset has dual front-mounted ROM cartridge ports with a locking knob on the left side of the main computer module to lock the ROM modules into place. The Mindset has the option (through its System Configuration Utility) to be able to select whether the system boots from left or right ROM carts, or disk drive. Cartridges can also contain CMOS RAM, which is retained when unplugged by a battery in the cartridge case. Cartridges were envisioned to be a primary medium for software distribution on the Mindset, but sales of the system were too low for cartridges to be economical, and software was distributed on disk instead.

While released in 1984, models of the M1001 Mindset computer with BIOS ROM code 1.07 and earlier show a copyright notice of (c) 1983 Mindset Computer Corp.

=== Sound processor ===
Mindset has a custom sound processor. The optional Sound Module adds a second custom sound processor along with a right channel audio output jack. There are four operating modes:

Mode	Name	Description
1	Music	Four musical voices with limited effects, wavetable lookup
2	Sound Effects/Music	Three voices with sound effects, modified wavetable lookup
3	Max Voice	Six voices with limited controls, all voices same volume, ramped waveform
4	See-Through	Direct access to DAC

== Rear ports ==
The rear of the computer is equipped with the following ports:

- Mono audio out
- Composite out
- TV/RF
- Channel 3/4 select switch
- RGB video output
- EXT sync
- Aux in
- Aux out

The rear of the main computer module also has 3× 36-pin Expansion bus slots.

The Dual Disk/Memory Expansion Unit adds an additional three 36-pin Expansion bus slots to the system.

== Expansion modules ==
- Dual Disk Drive / Memory Expansion Module. Some are marked Model # M1003 and others M1004, despite there being no internal or external differences.
- Printer Module – parallel
- RS-232-C Module – serial
- Modem Module 300
- Modem Module 1200
- 128 KB memory "Cartridge Module"
- Hard Drive System, consisting of an Interface "Cartridge Module" and HD loader on NVRAM cartridge
- Stereo Module – adds right channel output jack and second sound processor

== Peripherals ==
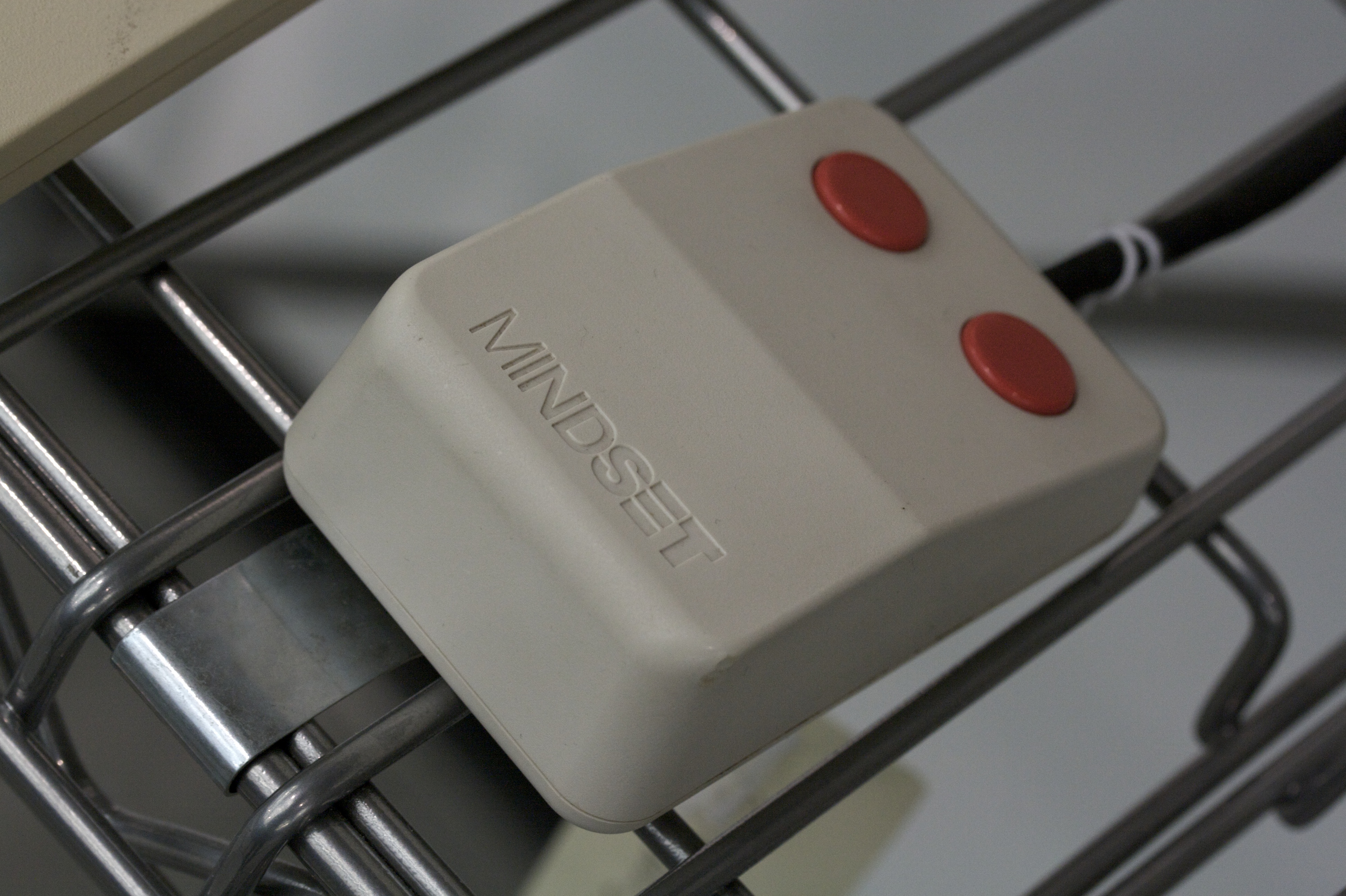
Mindset mouse

- Mouse
- Analog joystick
- Touch Tablet
- Video Production Module – video fader

== Video game ==
Only one video game has been released for the Mindset:

- Vyper (Synapse Software, 1984)
