= Space Invaders (Atari 2600 video game) =

1980 video game

- Cover art, credited to "Norman"
- Developer: Atari, Inc.
- Publishers: Atari, Inc.
- Designer: Rick Maurer
- Series: Space Invaders
- Platform: Atari 2600
- Release: March 10, 1980
- Genre: Fixed shooter
- Modes: Single-player, multiplayer

Space Invaders is a 1980 fixed shooter video game developed and published by Atari, Inc. for the Atari 2600 (Note: The console was called the Atari Video Computer System (Atari VCS) from its launch in 1977 until it was rebranded as the Atari 2600 in November 1982.) as a port of Taito's 1978 arcade game of the same name. The game plays similar to its arcade counterpart, as the player operates a laser cannon to shoot incoming alien enemies from outer space. The 2600 version has unique graphics and offers gameplay variations including a two-player mode and options that allow for invisible enemies, moving shields, and for enemies' shots to zig-zag.

The Atari 2600 version of Space Invaders was designed and developed by Rick Maurer. Prior to working at Atari, Maurer developed games at Fairchild Semiconductor. Impressed with the Space Invaders arcade game, he began developing an Atari 2600 version during his time at Atari. The company staff showed little interest in the game until then-Atari president and CEO Ray Kassar saw how well Space Invaders was doing in arcades; Kassar obtained the rights to the game for the Atari 2600 and had Maurer complete his code.

Space Invaders was one of Atari's biggest hits in 1980, with Electronic Games magazine calling it a console seller for the system. It became one of the best-selling games for the Atari 2600, and has been described as the video game industry's first killer app. When Maurer was only compensated with an $11,000 bonus for the success of the game, he left the company and never developed another Atari 2600 game. The success of Space Invaders led to Atari seeking out games from other arcade companies such as Namco and Centuri.

== Gameplay ==
The player-controlled laser cannon (bottom left) shoots the aliens as they descend. Game scores are tracked at the top. Maurer's creature designs differ from the original arcade game's.

Space Invaders has the player at war with enemies from outer space. The player uses the joystick to move left and right and presses the red button to fire a laser cannon. The goal is to earn as many points as possible by destroying the enemies with a laser cannon and to eliminate them before they reach the bottom of the screen. While descending, the aliens will shoot lasers at the player's cannon; three hits will end the game. The further rows of aliens give the player more points when hit. Upon destroying all 36 aliens, a new set will appear. In a single-player game, a Command Alien ship worth 100 bonus points will periodically move across the top of the screen.

The Atari 2600 version of Space Invaders alters the gameplay of the arcade original. It has 36 invaders instead of 55 and only three defense bunkers instead of four. There are game variations with moving bunkers, shots that zig-zag, and invisible invaders that are briefly shown after being shot. The home version of Space Invaders added two types of co-operative play: a partnered mode where each player can only move left or right respectively and both can fire the cannon, and another where one player shoots and the other moves the ship.

== Development ==
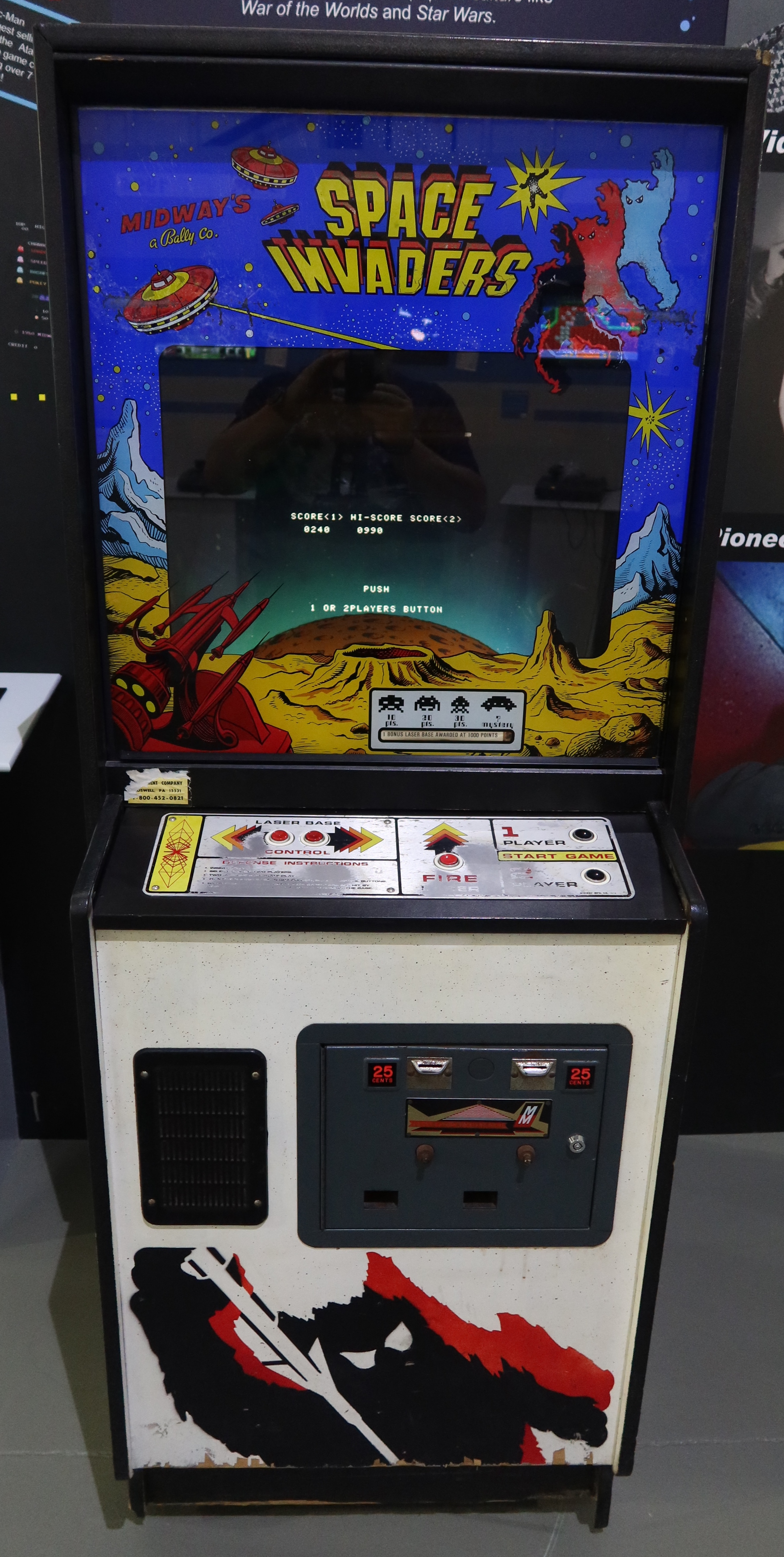
Space Invaders is a port of the arcade game by the same name originally developed by Taito.

The original arcade version of Space Invaders was programmed by Toshihiro Nishikado for Taito in 1978. Midway arranged to distribute the game in the United States following its success in Japan. The Atari version of Space Invaders was developed by Rick Maurer. Prior to working for Atari, Inc., Maurer worked at Fairchild Semiconductor, developing games such as Pinball Challenge and Hangman for the Fairchild Channel F. Atari had released the Atari 2600 home console towards the end of 1977. It launched with nine games, four of which—Air-Sea Battle, Combat, Star Ship, and Video Olympics—were based on existing Atari arcade properties: Anti-Aircraft (1975), Tank (1974), Starship 1 (1977), and Pong (1972), respectively.

Maurer came up with the idea of developing a version of Space Invaders for the Atari 2600. At the time in the company, games were not assigned to developers, leading him to scout local arcades for ideas. Maurer was impressed by Taito's Space Invaders arcade game, specifically the sound of the game, and began developing the game on his own in 1978. He described the process of coding for the Atari 2600 as "having to unlearn every good programming practice you've learned." After a few months of development, he had a playable prototype. The consumer division of Atari later instructed Maurer to cease further work on the game. He then focused on coding Maze Craze (1980), which he thought would help him hone his coding skills for the Atari 2600.

Management at Atari later noticed the financial success of Taito's Space Invaders in late 1978. Ray Kassar went to Japan in 1979 to get the rights to the game. This allowed Maurer to continue development of his version. He initially sought a cover art designer at Atari to create the illustrations of the invaders on graph paper to use in the game. Unable to find a designer, Maurer created his own designs for the characters. Maurer's Space Invaders was initially seven kilobytes (KB) and had to be reduced. He spent three months editing his code to be able to fit on the four KB ROM cartridge.

== Release ==
Space Invaders was released for the Atari 2600 on March 10, 1980. As with the company's other releases, Atari would re-release the game over the console's lifespan. The earliest release had only text printed on the cartridge's black label. Starting in 1981, Atari added pictures to the labels of all its game cartridges, including Space Invaders. The last two re-releases feature labels that are first silver, then red. By 1982, Sears released an Atari 2600 console variant called the Tele-Games Video Arcade II, which included a Space Invaders cartridge.

In 1980, Atari sponsored a nationwide Space Invaders tournament in the United States, with regional qualifiers in Los Angeles, San Francisco, Fort Worth, Chicago, and New York. The company started the event to help promote the release of its port, which contestants played to earn the highest score. Around 10,000 participants competed in the tournament, which culminated in a championship round in November between the five regional finalists at the Warner Communications headquarters in New York. The winner, Rebecca Heineman, would go on to become a video game developer. Electronic Games magazine staff noted an increased amount of media coverage around the same time and stated that the event helped establish video gaming as a mainstream hobby.

== Reception ==
Reception

Review scores
Publication	Score
AllGame	5/5
The Complete Guide to Electronic Games	5/5
Computer and Video Games	46%
Electronic Games	10/10
Micro & Video	5/5
Video Games Player	A

Space Invaders became a high seller in 1980, earning Atari more than $100 million. Along with popular arcade games Asteroids (1979), Missile Command (1980) and Battlezone (1980), it would move Atari to a growth of $512.7 million for the year. Bill Kunkel and Frank Laney in Video magazine found the variants on the arcade game interesting, but suggested that purists would probably focus on the original version of the game included in the release. In his 1981 book The Complete Guide to Electronic Games, Howard J. Blumenthal suggested that the game required skilled agility and hand-eye coordination and concluded that it was "a highly competitive reaction game, and one of the best available." Ken Uston similarly stated in his book Ken Uston's Guide to Buying and Beating the Home Video Games that Space Invaders was "one of Atari's best cartridges". In How to Win at Home Video Games (1982), an anonymous reviewer wrote that "Of all the available bottom-shooting games that pit you against colorful rows of descending monsters, none can compare with the one and only home version of the classic arcade game". In the 1983 Software Encyclopedia from Electronic Games, the writers gave the game an overall perfect ten rating, noting high rankings for single-player gameplay, while only finding the game's graphics and sound to be merely good.

From retrospective reviews, Micro & Video reviewed in the game in 1983, finding the game's graphics were "rough" while the game still held up as one of the best cartridges available for the system. Computer and Video Games staff reviewed the game in 1989, calling the graphics low-quality by contemporary standards. While the reviewer noted it was an "enjoyable diversion for a while", they suggested that several other newer games offered more variety and excitement. In a 2007 overview of the game in Retro Gamer, Stuart Campbell commented that the game did not resemble the Space Invaders that players knew; however, he stated the port had so many qualities that it was still a challenging and exciting game. In the magazine's list of the top 25 Atari 2600 games, Stuart Hunt and Darran Jones listed Space Invaders at number 14, writing that it "may not have been able to successfully emulate its arcade peer, but its vast amount of options arguably made it just as good a game." Weiss awarded the game a perfect five-star rating for online game database AllGame. He later included the game in his 2014 book The 100 Greatest Console Video Games 1977-1987, writing that the changes made from the original made it an even better game, such as the simultaneous two-player mode and various alternative gameplay modes that allowed for zig-zagging objects and invisible enemies. Fellow Atari developer Rob Fulop considered Maurer's port a programming feat at the time. In retrospect, he called Maurer a "genius", stating that no one else could animate that many characters or create that many game variations.

== Legacy ==
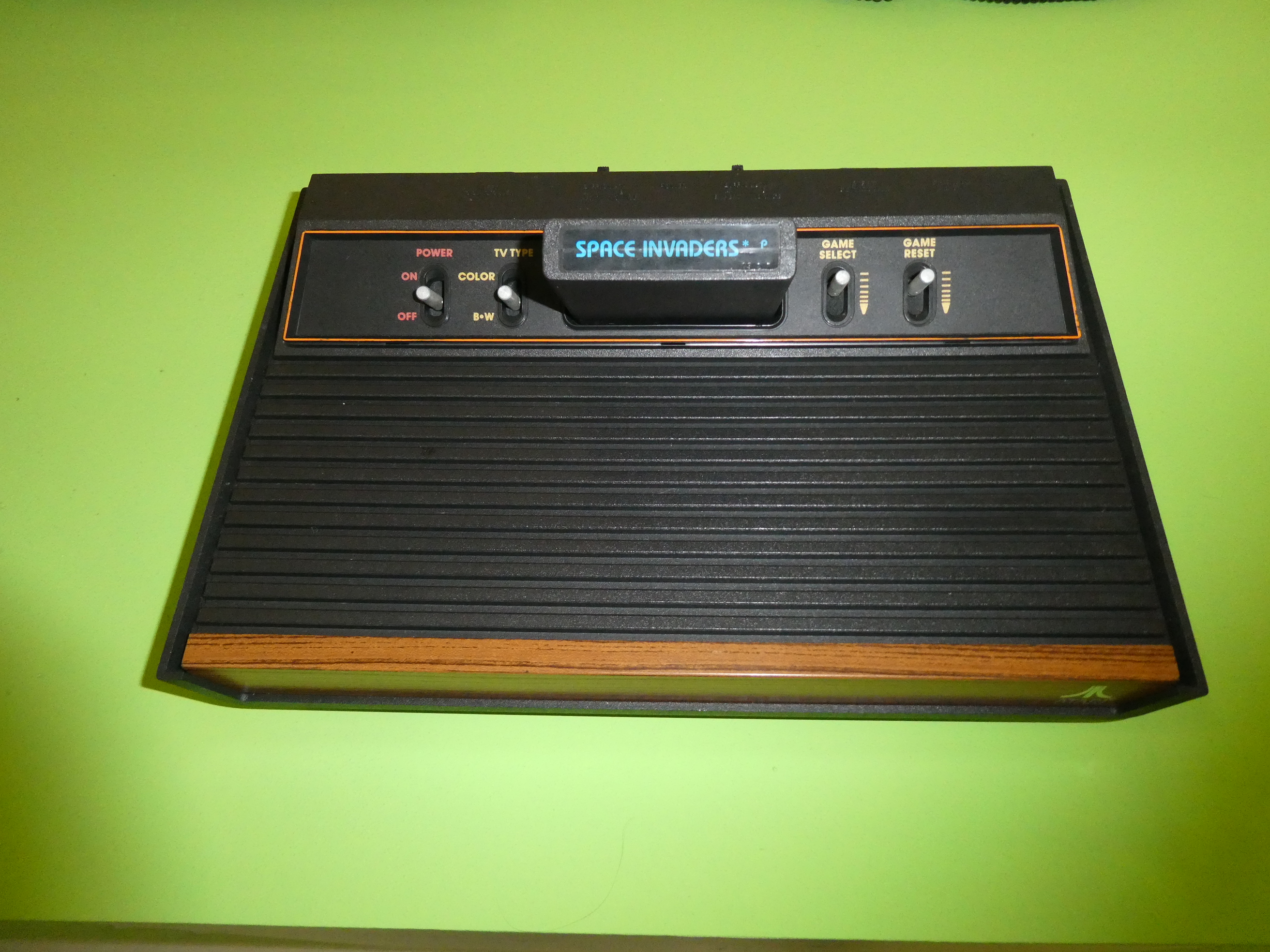
Edward B. Driscoll, Jr. of Poptronics described Space Invaders as giving not just Atari, but "the whole home videogame industry", its killer app.

Prior to the release of Space Invaders, the sales of the Atari Video Computer System were described as "respectable, if not spectacular". The release of the game led to what Edward B. Driscoll, Jr. of Poptronics described as giving not just Atari, but "the whole home videogame industry", its killer app. The game went on to become one of the best-selling games for the Atari 2600, with Atari video game designer Larry Kaplan saying that the console "was not doing that well – there were only a few million in the field, and it looked like it was dying – then Space Invaders came out, and bam! It exploded." The Winter 1981 issue of Electronic Games reported that this console release of Space Invaders led to Atari's dominance in the home video game market and that it was the one title that "sold the entire [Atari 2600] system in many cases." Atari 2600 sales quadrupled following the game's release.

The success of the game led to Atari rescheduling its entire Atari 2600 line-up from being released during the holiday season to being released throughout the year. The company also began to focus on translating many arcade hits to the Atari 2600, starting with Missile Command in 1981. Following the financial success of Space Invaders, Maurer himself was compensated with a $11,000 bonus. He was working in Atari's coin-op division developing a game with vector graphics that was to be a color version of Asteroids (1979), but he stopped working on the game and left Atari. Maurer's code was picked up later by Owen Rubin and developed into the 1982 arcade game Space Duel.

Along with bringing its own arcade hits to the Atari 2600, Atari focused on licensing other popular arcade games to its console as it had with Space Invaders. In addition to its own arcade games like Asteroids and Super Breakout (1978), Atari would enter an agreement to license several of Namco's arcade titles in the United States in 1981. The next year, Atari received a four-year contract to distribute all current and future Centuri arcade games outside the arcade systems.

A special version of the game titled Pepsi Invaders (1983) was produced at Atari that was given to employees of the Coca-Cola Company at a sales convention. Fulop would translate his own version of Space Invaders to Atari 8-bit computers. Fulop's version also had unique elements to it, such as the invaders marching out of a rocket ship on the left side of the screen. Decades after its initial release, Atari 2600 homebrew hobbyists created an unofficial Space Invader Arcade version, which features graphics and gameplay closer to the original arcade game. In 2004, a hack titled Space Invader Deluxe was released for the Atari 2600, which includes cutscenes and color schemes similar to Space Invaders Part II (1979), using an extra 4K of rom to add a title screen and higher sound quality.

== See also ==
- List of Atari 2600 games
- List of Atari, Inc. games (1972–1984)
