= GVO (disambiguation) =

GVO may refer to:

- Gastric variceal obliteration
- Gavião of Jiparaná, a language of Brazil
- Generalized velocity obstacle
- Greenwich Village Orchestra, based in New York City
- Gruye-Vogt Organization, design firm founded in 1966 in Silicon Valley, California.
