= Nürburgring 1 =

1976 video game

- Developer: Dr. Reiner Foerst
- Publisher: Dr. Reiner Foerst
- Platform: Arcade
- Release: DE: Spring 1976
- Genre: Racing
- Mode: Single-player

Nürburgring 1 is an arcade video game developed by Dr. Reiner Foerst and released in 1976. It was first demonstrated at the German IMA show in Spring 1976. It is recognized as the world's earliest first-person racing video game and inspired the development of Atari, Inc.'s Night Driver.

== Gameplay ==
The game's arcade cabinet contains a steering wheel, shifter, pedals, and other controls in the form of buttons. The player drives along a twisting roadway bordered by white guardrails. The lower portion of the screen shows the speedometer, mileage, and other indicators. The game counts crashes and punishes them with a time penalty. It ends after 90 seconds or after driving across the finish line.

== Development ==
The game was created by Dr. Foerst not out of a desire to develop a video game, but in order to make a working driving simulation. Unable to find a way to cheaply scale down the earliest driving simulators by Volkswagen and BP, he decided to build one based on the technology he found inside a Pong video game machine. The resulting arcade game has no CPU and contains 28 separate circuit boards.

== Legacy ==
Dave Shepperd, a programmer at Atari, Inc., saw a picture of the arcade cabinet in a flyer that had a small portion of the screen visible, which inspired him to create Night Driver. Atari was able to miniaturize the game to a single board and ultimately capitalized on Nürburgring 1 while that game remained largely unknown.

Nürburgring 1 also inspired another arcade racing game, Midway's 280 ZZZAP, which debuted as Midnight Racer at the Amusement & Music Operators Association (AMOA) show in November 1976. Play Meter magazine, reporting on the show, used the term "re‑make" to describe both Night Driver and Midnight Racer due to their similarities with the earlier German game. They were the most talked-about driving games at the show along with Namco's electro-mechanical F-1.

Several other versions of Nürburgring 1 were created. The second installment in the series has motorcycle handlebars, while the third is in full color with selectable backgrounds. Other versions of the third game in the series have cabinets that swivel back and forth on a turntable, as well as bank back and forth.
