= PaTaank =

1994 video game

- Developer: PF.Magic
- Publisher: Crystal Dynamics
- Producers: David Feldman; Rob Fulop
- Designers: Curtis Norris; Joel Dubiner; Leslie Hedger
- Programmer: Andre Burgoyne
- Artists: Charles Hacskaylo; Lisa Wong
- Composer: Nicolaas tenBroek
- Platform: 3DO Interactive Multiplayer
- Release: NA: 3 November 1994; JP: 3 November 1994
- Genre: Pinball
- Modes: Single-player, multiplayer

PaTaank is a 1994 video game developed by PF.Magic and published by Crystal Dynamics for the 3DO.

== Gameplay ==
Gameplay screenshot

Pataank is a pinball game where the player steers the pinball hovering on a puck, hitting it into targets. The game has three playfields, called Luv, Surf, and Disaster. These only have a passing resemblance to a pinball table and include walls showing film clips. The game is played in a third-person perspective without being able to see an overhead view.

== Development and release ==
PaTaank was developed by San Francisco-based PF.Magic for affiliate Crystal Dynamics, the latter of which had established itself as a sought-after name early in the life of the 3DO Interactive Multiplayer. It was the first game signed to the company's publishing partner program for publishing, sales and distribution in early 1994. Producer Rob Fulop suggested that it was the console's manufacturer, The 3DO Company, that paid for the project's production, similar to how Philips funded the developer's Max Magic for the CD-i. "We were drawn to the machines because they would allow you to work with real images and audio and that was a new paradigm which could open us up to new things," he said. When asked about the game's origin, Fulop responded, "We just wanted to do something cool for the 3DO system ... and 3D pinball sounded cool .. so we tried to make it. It came out okay ... certainly not an epic game by any standards." Fulop also stated that the concept of playing as the ball inside of a pinball machine may have been too innovative for its time. BMG Interactive picked up the distribution rights for the European and Japanese releases. The game's title (pronounced "puh-tonk") is the onomatopoeia for the sound a pinball or puck makes when hitting a surface.

== Reception ==
Reception

Review scores
Publication	Score
Electronic Gaming Monthly	24/40
GamePro	17.5/20
Next Generation	2/5
3DO Magazine	4/5
Coming Soon Magazine	3.5/5
Electronic Games	D+
Entertainment Weekly	A−
Génération 4	8%
VideoGames	7/10

Next Generation reviewed the game, rating it two stars out of five, and stated that "It's an interesting idea, done badly." Entertainment Weekly gave the game an A−. 3DO Magazine found the game difficult to control and felt it was more and experiment than a full game , but praising it for showcasing the technical ability of the 3DO. Ron Dulin initially found the controls confusing, but found it fun and original and very easy to beat once the controls were mastered. A reviewer for Electronic Games disliked the game, calling its gameplay "terribly flawed", and concluding it "captures neither the fun and challenge of pinball".
