= George Opperman =

Graphic designer

Atari logo by George Opperman

George Opperman (January 5, 1935 – November 27, 1985) was a graphic designer who co-founded the design consultancy Gruye-Vogt-Opperman, and later created the original Atari logo.

The Atari symbol was designed by George Opperman in 1972/3. At the time, Opperman was the head of his own design agency, Opperman-Harrington Inc. The Atari logo, later described as a "Fuji" (as in Mount Fuji in Japan), looks like the letter "A", and was meant to represent the game Pong, with "two opposing video game players with the center of the Pong court in the middle." In addition to the Atari logo, Opperman produced art for Atari's coin-op cabinets, and backglass artwork for Atari pinball games such as Airborne Avenger and Superman.

George Opperman died of lung cancer at age 50 on November 27, 1985.
