= Demon Attack =

1982 video game

- Atari 2600 box art
- Developer: Imagic
- Publisher: Imagic
- Designer: Rob Fulop
- Programmers: Atari 2600; Rob Fulop; Odyssey 2, Atari 8-bit Dave Johnson; Intellivision; Gary Kato
- Artist: Michael Becker
- Platforms: Atari 2600: Intellivision; Atari 8-bit; Odyssey 2; Philips Videopac+ G7400; TI-99/4A; TRS-80 Color Computer; Commodore 64; IBM PCjr; VIC-20
- Release: March 1982: Atari 2600; March 1982; Intellivision; October 1982; Odyssey 2; NA: March 1983; PAL: August 1983; TI-99/4A; 1984
- Genre: Fixed shooter
- Modes: Single-player, multiplayer

Demon Attack is a fixed shooter video game created by Rob Fulop for the Atari 2600 and published by Imagic in 1982. The game involves the player controlling a laser cannon from the surface of a planet, shooting winged demons that fly down and attack in different sets of patterns.

Fulop designed the game after leaving Atari, saying he was not properly reimbursed for his work on a port of Space Invaders. He co-founded the company Imagic in 1981 and began developing Demon Attack. It was the first game he developed that had a graphic artist, Michael Becker, who created eight-phase animations for the demons. Upon the game's release in 1982, it received positive critical attention for its graphics and gameplay and became one of the best-selling Atari 2600 games, and the best-selling game developed by Imagic.

Programmer Gary Kato created a port of Demon Attack for the Intellivision console which added a final boss mothership. The boss was similar in gameplay to the final boss in Phoenix (1980), a game Atari had exclusive console rights to. This led to Atari filing a suit against Imagic. A settlement was reached in January 1983, with Imagic being allowed to release Demon Attack for several video game consoles and home computers in the 1980s.

== Gameplay ==
Demon Attack is set on a surface of a planet, (Note: In the Atari 2600 version, the manual describes the location as the ice planet of Krybor, while in the Intellivision manual, the game is set on the Moon.) when strange winged creatures float above, threatening the player. They attack, leading the player to retaliate by shooting at them with a laser cannon.

Matthew House of AllGame described the game as a fixed shooter. The players start with three lives, called bunkers in the game, which are displayed at the bottom of the screen. Each time the players are hit by enemy fire, they lose a bunker, and the game ends when all bunkers are depleted. The waves of enemies grow more complex as the game progresses, with wave five having enemies divide into two smaller enemies after being shot. Later waves have enemies that will dive towards the laser cannon.

The players can move left and right at the bottom of the screen to avoid enemies. The game offers different modes of play, including a Tracer Shot mode, which allows the player to guide lasers after they are shot. Two-player games can either be played competitively against each other or as a co-op mode. In the co-op mode, the two players alternate every four seconds on who controls moving and firing the ship's laser. In competitive mode, each player controls their laser cannon simultaneously with their own score and bunker count. If one player loses all their bunkers, the other player continues until their bunkers are also lost.

In the Intellivision version, the boss fight with the demon flagship named Pandemonium appears after three waves of enemies are defeated. It is destroyed by eroding its shield with laser shots and aiming for a small rotating wheel of vulnerability.

== Development ==
Prior to working on Demon Attack, Rob Fulop worked at Atari developing sound effects for pinball machines as a summer job while studying electrical engineering at the University of California. Fulop's later projects included adaptations of arcade games such as Night Driver and Missile Command for the Atari 2600 and Space Invaders for the Atari 8-bit computers. He said that he expected a strong Christmas bonus from Atari based on how well Space Invaders had done commercially, but he only received a voucher for a free turkey dinner. Fulop then left Atari, and upon seeing how well Activision had been doing, he co-founded the company Imagic on July 17, 1981.

Fulop said that "I was angry at Atari and wanted to make something so good, they'd cry when they saw it. A lot of the best work is motivated by a desire to show someone what they've missed out on". This led to him designing Demon Attack. He said the game was modeled after Galaxian. The game took nine months to create. Demon Attack was the second original game Fulop had begun developing, as he had also worked on an original game at Atari that was never completed. The first complete version of Demon Attack only had one pattern of enemies repeated endlessly. Fulop focused on creating additional motions for the enemies to give them more of an organic movement pattern. It was the first game he developed that had a graphic artist, Michael Becker, who created eight-phase animation for the demons. According to Fulop, he originally wanted the title to be Death from Above before it was changed by marketing. Fulop later said that "I had to fight to keep the game in the lab for the last month, my mistake in finishing everything before polishing the motion—marketing was eager to ship it—I insisted on holding it back. It got quite heated".

Fulop only created the original game for the Atari 2600 and consulted on the Intellivision adaptation. Pat Ransil of Imagic said that the Atari 2600's hardware permitted smooth and easy movement across the screen horizontally, so Fulop designed the enemy demons to move on a mostly horizontal plane. Gary Kato designed the Intellivision version of the game, which let the demons move in any direction, as the system allowed for that in an easier way. Kato's version of Demon Attack features a final boss and less colorful enemies than the Atari 2600 version, but included other visual elements such as displaying the Moon's surface and having Earth in the background. Kato said he could not make the game look like the Atari version on the Intellivision, and credited Becker, who he described as Imagic's "head art guy", for creating the appearance of the boss enemy Pandemonium. Kato stated "when my eyes saw this, my mouth was hanging open, as soon as people started coming into work, I rushed back down and said...I have to have this in the game!" Kato concluded that if any art looked good in the game, it was created by Becker, while anything which did not look strong was his own. Fulop has said he worked closely with David Johnson on the Atari Computer version of the game, but that he generally just wrote three-page documents for the other versions on how the algorithms of his code functioned. There was no shared code for the later ports. Johnson would also code the Magnavox Odyssey 2 version of the game. A similar mother ship appears in the Commodore 64 version of the game.

== Release ==
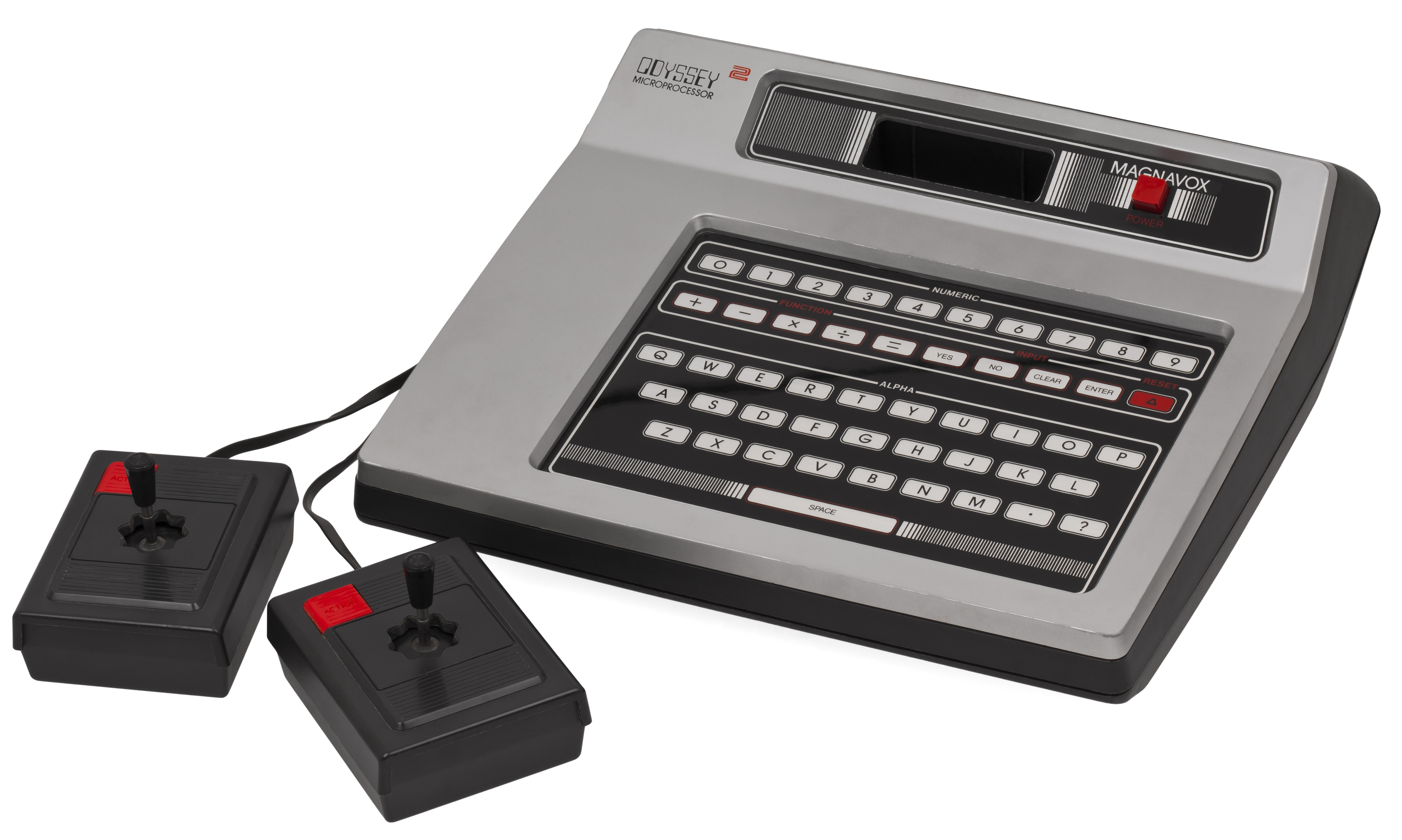
Demon Attack was the first video game released for the Magnavox Odyssey 2 (pictured) from an independent publisher.

Demon Attack was released in March 1982 for the Atari 2600 along with two other Imagic games: Star Voyager and Trick Shot. Becker created the cover art from model toys painted silver and blue. It was released for the Intellivision in October 1982.

By the end of 1982, the Atari 2600 version of Demon Attack was the third highest selling console game of the year, only being beaten by Pitfall! and Pac-Man. The game was also released for other consoles such as the Intellivision and Magnavox Odyssey 2. The Intellivision version was the 9th highest-grossing game of 1982. The Magnavox Odyssey 2 version of Demon Attack, which released in 1983 in both North America and Europe, was the first cartridge for the system by an independent publisher. It was also ported to several home computers, including the TI-99/4A, the Atari 8-bit computers, Commodore 64, VIC-20, TRS-80 Color Computer and IBM PCjr. The game was retitled Super Demon Attack for its release on the TI-99/4A computer and a port of the Odyssey 2 version called Demon Attack Plus when it was released for the Philips Videopac+ G7400 in France. Demon Attack was included in the Activision Anthology compilation, but was removed for the Game Boy Advance release.

Kato's version of Demon Attack for the Intellivision features a final boss named Pandemonium that is similar to the boss in the arcade game Phoenix (1980). Fulop had played Kato's version of the game and disliked the addition of the boss. He said: "That, to me, was totally stupid. I mean, it's exactly the same game [as Phoenix]". Atari had the exclusive rights to produce Phoenix for home consoles and filed suit against the company Imagic, believing that the Intellivision version of Demon Attack was too derivative of the arcade game. A settlement was reached in January 1983, with Imagic still being allowed to release Demon Attack. When asked about the legal issues between Atari and Imagic related to Demon Attack, Fulop said he "kept out of a lot of that. It was basically a silly hustling and political thing. I think I went to one deposition, that was it [...] No one really cared too much about it". Demon Attack went on to become the best selling Imagic game.

== Reception ==
Reception

Review scores
Publication	Score
Computer and Video Games	87%
Electronic Fun with Computers & Games	4/4
IGN	7.5/10
Video	9.5/10

In the British magazine Computer and Video Games, a reviewer wrote that Demon Attack's enormous success was due to the tough gameplay and exceptional graphics. Reviews in other publications praised the graphics, with Jan Yarnot of The Space Gamer and Randi Hacker in Electronic Fun with Computers & Games describing the enemies as being "excellent" and "vibrantly colorful" respectively. Bill Kunkel and Arnie Katz wrote in Video and went as far to say that Demon Attack had the best graphics among the most recent Atari 2600 games. Commenting on the gameplay, Yarnot said that the different enemy patterns made the game appropriately challenging. A reviewer in JoyStik How to Win at Video Games also commented that enemy movement was unpredictable, concluding the game was "simply one of the best game cartridges of its type available today". Yarnot commented negatively that the difficulty did not increase after the 12th wave, with earlier enemy patterns being repeated.

Gameplay footage of the first wave of enemies in Demon Attack for Atari 2600. Critics praised the vibrant colors, irregular enemy patterns and animation in the game.

Reviewing later ports, Phil Wiswell of Video Games said that while the Atari 2600 version was very good, the Intellivision version was even better, declaring it has "one of the nicest TV-game graphics ever". A reviewer in Blip compared Demon Attack and Phoenix, finding the Intellivision version was the best of the three, saying its addition of the final battle made it and Phoenix and the Atari 2600 version of Demon Attack feel like a Galaxian spin-off. The reviewer from Computer and Video Games compared the Intellivision game to Atari's Phoenix, stating Demon Attack had a slight edge, concluding that "Phoenix is pretty tough but for my money Demon Attack is tougher and prettier". InfoWorld's Essential Guide to Atari Computers cited the Atari 8-bit verson as "a real shoot-'em-up that demands your quickest reflexes". A review in Ahoy! found the VIC-20 version excellent, but said that it was not enhanced in any major way over the Atari 2600 game. Art Lewis of Electronic Fun with Computers & Games found the Odyssey 2 port not as smoothly colorful or as polished as the Atari 2600 original. Michael Blanchet, author of How to Beat the Video Games, praised the Odyssey 2 port as setting a new standard for games for the system, concluding that players should "find out what millions of Atari and Intellivision owners already know—Imagic's Demon Attack is one heck of a game".

Demon Attack won the 1983 Arcade Award for "Video Game of the Year", with Kunkel and Katz saying the game had superior graphics, sound and was "a challenge to the mental and physical capabilities of home arcaders". Video Games Player tallied twenty writers, editors and critics of the video game field and had Demon Attack voted as the "Space Game of the year" in their 1983 Golden Joystick Awards. Billboard magazine had their first Annual Video Game Awards conference in 1983, where Fulop was awarded the designer of the year for Demon Attack.

From retrospective reviews, a reviewer from Computer and Video Games found the game to be a clone of Galaxian and Phoenix, but still considered it to be a great game. GameSpy included the game in their Hall of Fame in 2002. GameSpy writer William Cassidy wrote that original Space Invaders-styled games on home consoles ranged from forgettable to pretty good, but Demon Attack was a standout due to its fast-paced action, responsive control, and audio-visual appeal. Brett Weiss included the game in his book The 100 Greatest Console Video Games 1977–1987 (2014), due to its popularity upon its release, and that it remained "a dynamic nicely animated shooter". Retro Gamer included Demon Attack in their list of top ten games for the Intellivision, compliments the versions graphics, mothership boss, and that it was superior to the Atari 2600 version. The publication would also name the game in their list of best Atari 2600 (at 13th) and VIC-20 games (at 6th).

== Legacy ==
Upon the game's success, Fulop responded that he knew the game would do well, but did not think it would do as well as it did. Fulop felt that Cosmic Ark (1982), his next game at Imagic, was not going to be as strong, saying he "wasn't hungry in the same way—wasn't into 'making them cry'". Fulop said that Imagic wanted to make a sequel to Demon Attack, but "I was too stupid to realize the sequel makes a lot more money". He made other games for the Atari 2600 and later went on to develop games like Night Trap (1992) and create the popular Petz (1995–2014) series.

Ian Bogost and Nick Montfort in their book Racing the Beam (2009) said Demon Attack "broke the mold" of development in console games by having a dedicated artist for game development with Michael Becker's contributions to the game, noting that prior to this, an artist working in game development would only work on the box art or design a printed manual.
