= Pepsi Invaders =

1983 video game

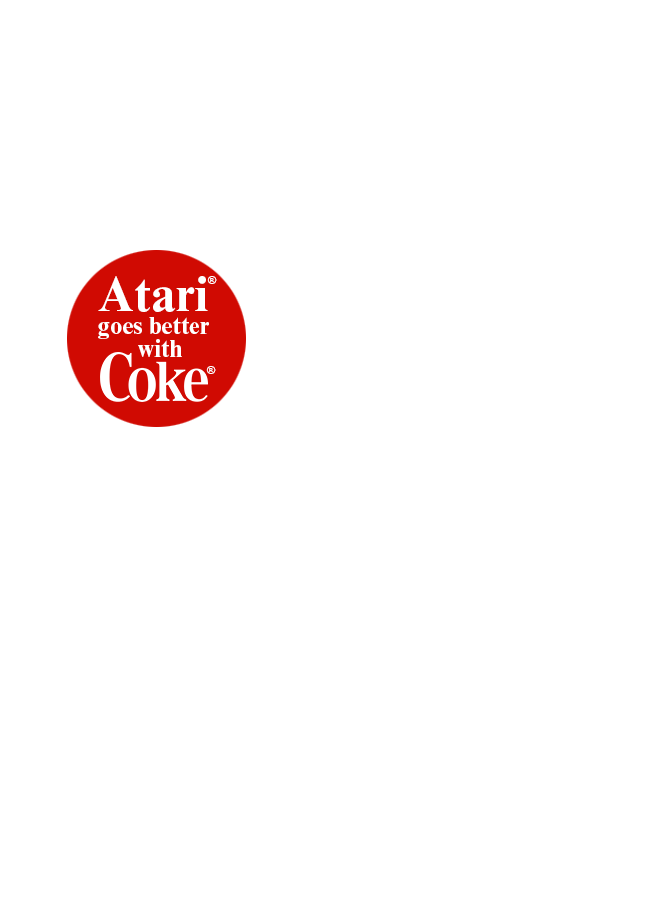
- Front box cover
- Developer: Atari, Inc.
- Programmer: Christopher Omarzu
- Platform: Atari 2600
- Release: 1983
- Genre: Fixed shooter
- Mode: Single-player

Pepsi Invaders (erroneously identified as Coke Wins and Coke Invaders) is a non-commercially released 1983 fixed shooter video game developed by Atari, Inc. for the Atari 2600. It was commissioned by The Coca-Cola Company to be handed out to salespeople at their 1983 sales convention. A reskin of the system's version of Space Invaders, it has the player shoot down a flying formation of letters spelling "PEPSI", Coca-Cola's long-time rival. Only 125 copies of the game were distributed.

== Gameplay ==
The "PEPSI" formation is clearly legible when the game starts.

The game is a modification of Space Invaders, with nearly identical gameplay, but with a number of tweaks. Instead of having limited lives and no time limit as in the original, Pepsi Invaders has unlimited lives and a three-minute time limit to complete as many waves of enemies as possible. If any invaders successfully traverse the lowest row, instead of the formation dropping to the ground and ending the game, it merely moves left and right until all the lowest row invaders are destroyed. It is therefore impossible to lose the game.

Primary graphic changes affected the invaders, each row of which consists of the letters "P E P S I" followed by a single alien, instead of the original six aliens per row. The letters move up and down as they march but do not otherwise animate. The UFO was changed to look like a flattened Pepsi logo in brand colors. A timer was added, displayed on the ground, which itself has been changed to a Coca-Cola-like brown color. An additional band of the same color frames the score at the top, with the word "COKE" prominently displayed to the left of the score. The player cannon now features two bands of the same brown color.

During the last 10 seconds, the timer and cannon limit indicators blink. When the time runs out, all invaders and UFOs disappear, the score changes to the word "WINS" (thus making the row read "COKE WINS!"), and the player cannon and all texts flash rapidly. The player's final score can be seen in the attract mode after the game ends.

== Development ==
Pepsi Invaders was commissioned by The Coca-Cola Company to be handed out to 125 executives at their 1983 sales convention along with an Atari 2600 console. It was developed by Atari, Inc. as a modification of the original Space Invaders cartridge. Due to the original Space Invaders Atari 2600 developer Rick Maurer leaving Atari over payment issues, Atari tasked designer Christopher Omarzu with hacking the original.

The game was delivered as a black cartridge with no label, in a plain white box with an "Atari goes better with Coke" sticker on the cover. The intent was to boost the morale of Coca-Cola's employees, but most of the cartridges were discarded by their recipients. Pepsi Invaders has been mistakenly labelled Coke Wins and Coke Invaders, to the confusion of Omarzu.

== Legacy ==
Writer Matthew S. Eastin notes it as an early example of an advergame–an advertisement game–and discussed how it was more an attack on a competitor than an advertisement by the company who had it made. The Guardian included it in its list of the best product placement video games, similarly noting it as an early example of this and a "mischievous" marketing attempt. PC Format called the game "a stroke of marketing genius worthy of The Apprentice". Retro Gamer was critical of Pepsi Invaders due to the letters not moving downward as the ships do in Space Invaders.

Copies of the game have sold for up to US$2,125 on eBay.

== See also ==
- Advertising in video games
