= Superman (pinball) =

1979 pinball machine

- front of flyer
- Manufacturer: Atari, Inc.
- Release date: March 1979
- System: Atari Generation/System 2
- Design: Steve Ritchie
- Programming: Eugene Jarvis
- Artwork: George Opperman
- Sound: Rob Fulop, Eugene Jarvis
- Production run: 5,124 (approximate)

Superman is a pinball machine designed by Steve Ritchie and released by Atari in 1979.

== Design ==
Despite Warner Communications acquiring Atari, Inc. in 1976 this table and the video game of the same name were not developed alongside the 1978 film. Play Meter reported it was a tie-in with motion picture, but none of the marketing materials of this machine mention the movie. The award of the Superman license at Atari was between Steve Ritchie and another pinball designer at Atari, Gary Slater.

Over a period of about six months Steve Ritchie produced a series of whitewoods, including one called Rockstar. After playfield geometry issues were solved, one of these was put at a test location where it performed well.

The president of Williams Electronics. Mike Stroll, and chief of design Steve Kordek travelled to California to meet Steve Ritchie and Eugene Jarvis to offer them jobs at Williams. Ritchie agreed, and left Atari with the design of Superman about 95% complete, but still to be awarded the Superman license. New hardware was designed, discarding Atari's rotary flipper design which was unreliable, and moving the unconventional placement of the score display from the corner of the playfield to the backbox. The game uses two control boards housed in the backbox; a CPU board, and an I/O board. A series of further changes were implemented to improve reliability over earlier Atari pinball machines.

Rob Fulop worked on sound design for this game during a 10-week internship at Atari's coin-op division, and developed an editor for generating sound effects that would be used for other pinball machines. Eugene Jarvis completed the sounds.

The artwork was inspired by the original comic book, but Lois Lane and Lex Luthor tie-in with the film. Metropolis (including the Daily Planet building) is shown on the playfield, and the game has "The Fortress of Solitude", and "Luthor's Lair" lanes. RePlay noted that a flying or battling Superman is shown on the playfield at least six times. On the backglass, Superman is shown seemingly flying out from it.

== Layout ==
The playfield has a large Superman emblem surrounded with lights, including an arc of lights spelling SUPERMAN. The table includes four upper rollovers above three thumper bumpers. Below these at an angle is a bank of five drop-targets. On either side of the machine is a lane with a spinner; the "Fortress of Solitude" on the left leads the ball through a "curved metal maze" to the upper rollovers. Five targets around the playfield are each labelled with a letter of S-U-P-E-R. The game has one in-lane on the left side, and two on the right-side which are labelled with M-A.N. A fourth solitary thumper bumper is towards the left of the playfield.

== Gameplay ==
The upper rollovers control the bonus multiplier. Points are awarded for completing S-U-P-E-R-M-A-N, and extra balls can be lit by completing the drop-targets twice, or completing M-A-N.

== Reception ==
In a review for Play Meter, Roger Sharpe awarded the table 4/4, noting that with the hardware improvements the game remembers more settings from ball to ball. The game was found to have a good array of shots, and the theme had instant recognition. The colorful artwork and the design decision to move the score display to the backbox was praised.

RePlay said that gameplay is worthy of the name "Superman", and published an article about how the license enhanced the machine.

== Legacy ==
Superman was the last and best selling pinball machine manufactured by Atari. During its production Atari determined that they were losing US$200 per machine sold and decided to stop producing pinball machines.

A machine based on Wonder Woman had been considered and had concept art created in about 1978, but was never produced.
