= 280 ZZZAP =

1976 video game

- In-game screenshot
- Developer: Dave Nutting Associates
- Publishers: NA: Midway Manufacturing; JP: Taito
- Designers: Jamie Fenton; Dave Nutting
- Platforms: Arcade, Astrocade
- Release: NA: February 1977
- Genre: Racing
- Mode: Single-player
- Arcade system: Intel 8080-based hardware

280 ZZZAP is a racing arcade video game designed by Jamie Fenton for Dave Nutting Associates. Based on Nissan's Datsun 280Z, it is one of the earliest games with authorized branding.

== Gameplay ==
Players race at a speed that reaches 200 mph (320 km/h) on a night road course that is filled with sharp bends, all the while racing against other cars within a limited time frame.

== Release ==
Midway demonstrated the game under the name Midnight Racer at the AMOA show in November 1976. It drew comparisons to Night Driver, demonstrated at the same show by Atari, Inc. Both games are derived from the earlier German night driving video game Nürburgring 1 demonstrated at the German IMA show in Spring 1976. Before release in February 1977, the game was re-branded 280 ZZZAP after the US advertising campaign for Nissan's Datsun 280Z.

== Reception ==
On the US Play Meter arcade chart, 280 ZZZAP was the year's ninth highest-grossing arcade game of 1977. On the US RePlay arcade chart, it was the tenth highest-grossing arcade video game of 1977. On Japan's Game Machine arcade chart, it was among the top 20 highest-grossing arcade video games of 1977.
