= Cosmic Ark =

1982 video game

- Developer: Imagic
- Publisher: Imagic
- Designer: Rob Fulop
- Platform: Atari 2600
- Release: NA: August 1982
- Genre: Action
- Modes: Single-player, multiplayer

Cosmic Ark is an Atari 2600 game designed by Rob Fulop and published by Imagic in 1982. The objective is to gather specimens from different planets in a spaceship which contains the survivors from the city of Atlantis. There are two versions of the cartridge. One lets the player toggle the starfield display with the Black & White / Color TV switch. The other does not allow the starfield to be disabled.

== Gameplay ==
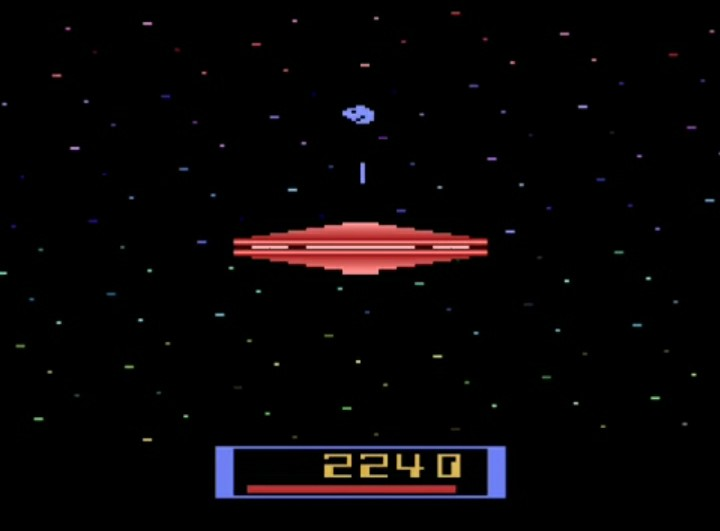
First stage, showing the mothership fending off meteors

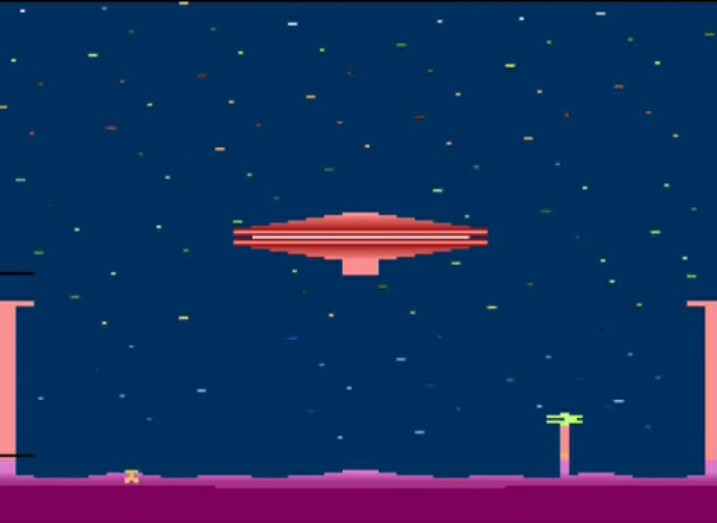
Second stage, showing a shuttle beaming up an alien

In the first stage, the player must fend off meteor showers from all four sides of the screen by pushing the joystick to fire in the desired direction, similar to the 1980 arcade game Space Zap. The second stage requires the player to pilot a shuttle to a planet and use its tractor beam to pick up life forms. While near the planet's surface, planetary defenses will fire at the shuttle. If hit, one formerly captured specimen will be freed, making the player retrieve another. After a set length of time, a klaxon will warn of renewed meteor activity, and the player must return immediately to defend the ark.

Cosmic Ark does not give a set number of lives. Instead, the ark starts with 40 fuel units, which are lost after each meteor strike or shot fired, and gained by destroying a meteor or capturing a life form. Capturing both life forms from a planet before the warning klaxon will top off fuel reserves. If the ark runs out of energy, the next hit it takes will end the game.

Like its predecessor, Atlantis, Cosmic Ark ends with the destruction of the Ark, but the smaller shuttle ship escaping. This plot thread was not continued in other Imagic games.

== Development ==
According to Fulop, the game was created entirely as a feat of technical one-upmanship: to show off the impressive background starfield effect to Activision programmers David Crane and Bob Whitehead. The starfield effect uses a bug in the Atari 2600 hardware.

== Reception ==
Richard A. Edwards reviewed Cosmic Ark in The Space Gamer No. 59. Although he called it fun at first, he noted that the game becomes more challenging in later stages.

== Reviews ==
- TeleMatch (January 1983)
- Electronic Fun with Computers & Games (February 1983)
- Tilt (March 1983)
