= Gruye-Vogt Organization =

The Gruye-Vogt Organization (originally Gruyé-Vogt-Opperman Inc., and throughout its history most often known as GVO) was a design consultancy founded in 1966 by industrial designers Dale W. Gruyé and Noland E. Vogt together with graphic designer George Opperman, in Palo Alto, California, the heart of Silicon Valley.

Gruyé had been an industrial design engineer at General Electric and Hewlett-Packard, and Vogt had worked at General Electric and then Ampex; they were joined by Opperman in founding a firm that combined graphic design, marketing, advertising, and industrial design services, an unusual combination at the time. GVO was one of the first firms to integrate design with research based on human factors and ethnographic methods for technology companies in Silicon Valley.

GVO conducted projects for clients including Syntex, Johnson Controls, GRiD Systems Corporation, Huggies, and Canon.

Opperman left GVO in 1971 to found his own firm, Opperman-Harrington Inc. (this prompted GVO to restyle itself as the Gruyé-Vogt Organization, in order to keep the same abbreviation), and would go on to design the iconic logo for Atari; Gruyé left the firm in 1984 to found his own, Gruyé Associates.

GVO eventually went bankrupt in the midst of the dotcom crash, and closed in September 2001.
