= Rob Fulop =

American game programmer

- Rob Fulop as seen in Electronic Games in 1983
- Born: October 20, 1959 (age 67)
- Education: University of California, Berkeley
- Known for: Demon Attack; Cosmic Ark; Night Trap

Rob Fulop (born October 20, 1959) is an American game programmer who created two of the Atari 2600's biggest hits: the port of arcade game Missile Command and 1982's Demon Attack, which won Electronic Games' Game of the Year award. While at Atari, Fulop also ported Night Driver to the 2600 and Space Invaders to the Atari 8-bit computers.

== Early life ==
Fulop grew up in Oakland, California where was first introduced to computers via a teletype in Skyline High School in 1974, which he used to create simple programs in BASIC such as a coin flipper and a game similar to Nim. His experience with the device inspired him to pursue a degree in electrical engineering and computer science at the University of California, Berkeley. At Berkeley, Fulop learned to code in other programming languages including Fortran, Pascal, and C.

== Career ==
=== Atari (1978–1981) ===
While studying in university, Fulop got an internship in Atari's coin-op division where he worked on sound design for a Superman pinball machine and developed an editor to be used for generating sound effects for other pinball machines.

After graduating, Fulop went back to Atari. He was hired to work in the company's home division where he created arcade ports for Atari's newly released 2600 console as well as the company's family of 8-bit computers.

After creating the Atari 8-bit port of Space Invaders, which was criticized due to its changing of certain elements of the arcade original, such as the removal of shields, Fulop developed a port of Missile Command for the Atari 2600, which was a commercial success. As a Christmas bonus that year, he only received a coupon for a free turkey. Chagrined by the feeling of being unappreciated by Atari for his work on the game, Fulop decided to leave the company.

=== Imagic (1981–1983) ===
On July 17, 1981, a group of employees from Atari's home console division including Fulop quit their jobs to help form their own company, Imagic, urged on by the success of the ex-Atari employees who formed Activision and the lack of credit and financial compensation they were receiving for their work at Atari. At Imagic, developers received credit and royalties for every game they produced. Fulop developed one of the studio's debut games, Demon Attack, which went on to become one of the best selling 2600 games of all time.

After finishing working on Cosmic Ark in 1982, Fulop traveled to Hungary to visit relatives. During his visit he met Erno Rubik, the creator of the Rubik's Cube, which inspired him to create a two-player puzzle game as he felt the genre was under-represented at the time. In six weeks, he'd designed CubiColor; however, Imagic decided against publishing the game due to their belief that a puzzle game would not sell well enough. Fulop later released the game via newsletters. About 100 copies are known to exist.

In September 1982, Fulop began development on his last game for Imagic, Fathom, a deep sea action adventure game. Development wrapped on the game in June 1983. Meanwhile, Imagic was facing financial trouble. The company was set to go public on December 10th 1982, but an Atari sales announcement two days before kicked off the video game crash of 1983 and forced the initial public offering to be pulled. Imagic struggled to recover. They fired 40 of 170 employees in September 1983 and began to pivot away from console video games. By the end of the year, Fulop had left the company.

=== Post-Video Game Crash Career (1983–1998) ===
After a brief stint doing freelance development for Parker Brothers, Fulop started work on a game called Actionauts for the 2600 independently. The game, which was about programming a tiny robot so that it would be capable of navigating itself out of a maze, had its development shifted to the Commodore 64 due to the dwindling popularity of the 2600 and the game concept being more suitable for a computer rather than a console. He got a development deal from Simon & Schuster to publish the game; however, they left the software business before the project could be realized. Fulop then decided to release the game as freeware via a bulletin board players could connect to in order to download the game. Commodore was excited by the manner in which the game was being released, so they decided to publish an article about the game which included the bulletin board's phone number, but a different number was mistakenly printed in the article, leading to thousands of calls being placed to the wrong number.

Fulop was later hired by Nolan Bushnell's company Axlon as part of their NEMO team. Fulop created Night Trap for the NEMO console system, however, due to its cancellation the game was shelved and later released on the Sega CD. The game famously caused controversy upon its release due to its portrayal of violence against women, and was heavily criticized in the 1993 congressional hearings on video games alongside Mortal Kombat and Lethal Enforcers, this, alongside negative reactions from his friends and family, caused Fulop to be concerned about the messages video games were sending out to children, this, in turn, inspired Fulop's next game, which he decided would be so cute and "sissy" that no one could claim had a harmful effect on youth. The end result was 1995's Dogz: Your computer Pet, which was released by PF.Magic, a company he co-founded. The game proved to be popular and kickstarted the Petz franchise of pet simulation video games.

Fulop later worked on Max Magic for the Philips CD-I, the game consisted of a fortune teller and magician who would perform magic tricks with the aid the player, who'd presumably use it to perform a magic show, Fulop worked with Max Maven on the game, who authored the tricks and recorded some of the voices.

PF.Magic was acquired by The Learning Company in May 1998. and in March 2001, Ubisoft acquired the entertainment division of The Learning Company, and with it the rights to the Petz franchise.

=== Zynga (2008) ===
In August 2008, Fulop joined American social game developer Zynga as an independent contractor until September, when he became a full time employee.

In October, Fulop, who had previously suffered from a heart attack in 2005, began experiencing chest pains and had to have a heart operation. He informed his team leader that he would need some time off to undergo the operation; Fulop was terminated from the team nine days later and from the company altogether soon after the operation, he sued the company for violating the Fair Employment and Housing Act alleging that it had discriminated against him on the basis of age and disability.

== Personal life ==
Fulop plays poker semi-professionally, competing in various high limit poker games in northern California. In January 2004, Fulop went to Las Vegas to visit Antonio Esfandiari and Phil Laak, while there, he wrote a humorous guest column for Bluff, a poker magazine, about his trip there and his stay at Esfandiari's house, the piece was well received, leading to Fulop writing a semi-regular column for the magazine.

Fulop is an amateur Jazz and Ragtime pianist; in 2015, he joined the indie rock band Bourbon Therapy, based out of Oakland, California, as the pianist/keyboardist. Bourbon Therapy released their second album, Hymnals and Hangovers, featuring Fulop on piano and keyboard, on September 9, 2016. As of 2020, Fulop is no longer a member of this band. Rob married his wife, Becky Fulop, in 2016.

== Games ==
- Superman (pinball machine) (1979)
- Night Driver (1980) (Atari 2600 port)
- Space Invaders (1980) (Atari 400/800 port)
- Missile Command (1981) (Atari 2600 port)
- Demon Attack (1982)
- Cosmic Ark (1982)
- CubiColor (1982) (cancelled)
- Fathom (1983)
- Actionauts (1986)
- Rabbit Jack's Casino (1986)
- Night Trap (1992)
- Sewer Shark (1992)
- 3rd Degree (1993)
- Max Magic (1994)
- PaTaank (1994)
- Dogz: Your Virtual Pet (1995)
