= Night Driver (video game) =

1976 video game

- North American arcade flyer
- Developer: Atari, Inc.
- Publishers: NA/EU: Atari, Inc.; JP: Namco
- Designers: Dave Shepperd s/w Ron Milner; Steve Mayer; Terry Fowler (hardware)
- Platforms: Arcade, Atari 2600, Commodore 64
- Release: Arcade: NA: October 1976; EU: 1976; JP: April 1977; Atari 2600: June 22, 1980; Commodore 64: 1982
- Genre: Racing
- Mode: Single-player
- Arcade system: 6502 @ 1.008 MHz

Night Driver is a 1976 racing video game developed and published by Atari, Inc. for arcades. It is one of the earliest first-person racing video games and is commonly believed to be one of the first published video games to feature real-time first-person graphics. Night Driver has a black and white display with the hood of the player's car painted on a plastic overlay. The road is rendered as scaled rectangles representing "pylons" that line the edges.

Two arcade cabinet styles were manufactured: upright and sit-down. The upright version has a blacklight installed inside the cabinet which illuminated the bezel.

Atari published a color version for the Atari Video Computer System in 1980.

== Gameplay ==
The player controls a car which must be driven along a road at nighttime without crashing into the sides of the road as indicated by road side reflectors. The game is controlled with a single pedal for the accelerator, a wheel for steering and a four-selection lever for gear shifting. The coin-operated game had a choice of three difficulties (novice, pro and expert), which the player could select at game start. The turns were sharper and more frequent on the more difficult tracks. As play progresses, the road gets narrower and more winding.

The game length is 50, 75, 100, or 125 seconds based on an internal setting. After 300 points, a player is awarded bonus time equal to game time, but the score wraps around back to zero at 1000 points, so it is possible to reach 300 points more than once. Due to the additional points received for more difficult play, playing on the expert setting is actually the easiest to achieve extra time once a player has mastered the game.

The car the player is driving is not actually drawn in the game, but is printed on plastic insert in front of the monitor.

== Development ==
The development of Night Driver was led by Dave Shepperd at Atari, who was given an assignment to develop a first-person driving video game. Shepperd said that he "was given a piece of paper with a picture of a game cabinet that had a small portion of the screen visible" which he recalls being possibly "a German game" but "never saw the game play" other than "that there were a few little white squares showing". Shepperd used that concept to develop Night Driver. That the car is driving at night provided an excuse for the minimal graphics, as most features (like the street and buildings) aren't visible in the dark. While he did not know the title of the German game at the time, it was later identified as the coin-op Nürburgring 1, a first-person driving video game released earlier in 1976.

Atari used some of the leftover arcade cabinets from Hi-way (1975), a top-down vertically scrolling racing game, for Night Driver.

== Release ==
The arcade game began production in October 1976. Atari demonstrated the game at the AMOA show in November 1976, where it was one of several driving games demonstrated by Atari along with Sprint 2 and Namco's electro-mechanical F-1; the most talked-about driving game at the show was F-1. Night Driver also drew comparisons to Midway Manufacturing's Midnight Racer (later re-branded Datsun 280 ZZZAP) at the same show and an earlier German night driving video game (Nürburgring 1) demonstrated at the German IMA show in Spring 1976.

=== Ports ===
Atari VCS Night Driver

Atari released a port for the Atari VCS (later renamed to the Atari 2600) in 1980. It was programmed by Rob Fulop, who added color, displaying the player vehicle, additional vehicles the player must avoid, and showing houses and trees along the sides of the road. The paddle controller steers the vehicle; holding the button accelerates. It is not possible to shift gears in this version. There are eight variations, some of which are timed and the player tries to score as much as they can in 90 seconds.

Commodore published a version for the Commodore 64 in 1982.

== Reception ==
In Japan, it was the tenth highest-grossing arcade video game of 1976.

In the United States, according to Play Meter magazine, Night Driver was the sixth highest-earning arcade video game of 1977. According to RePlay magazine, it was the seventh highest-earning arcade video game of 1977. Play Meter later listed it as the ninth highest-grossing arcade game of 1978, and the eleventh highest arcade video game of 1979.

The Atari VCS version sold 161,352 copies in 1980, becoming one of the top five best-selling Atari VCS games that year, and went on to sell over 1.9 million copies by 1983. Video Games Player magazine reviewed the Atari VCS version, rating the graphics and sound a B, while giving the game an overall A− rating. In 1995, Flux magazine ranked the arcade version 59th on their "Top 100 Video Games" list.

== Legacy ==
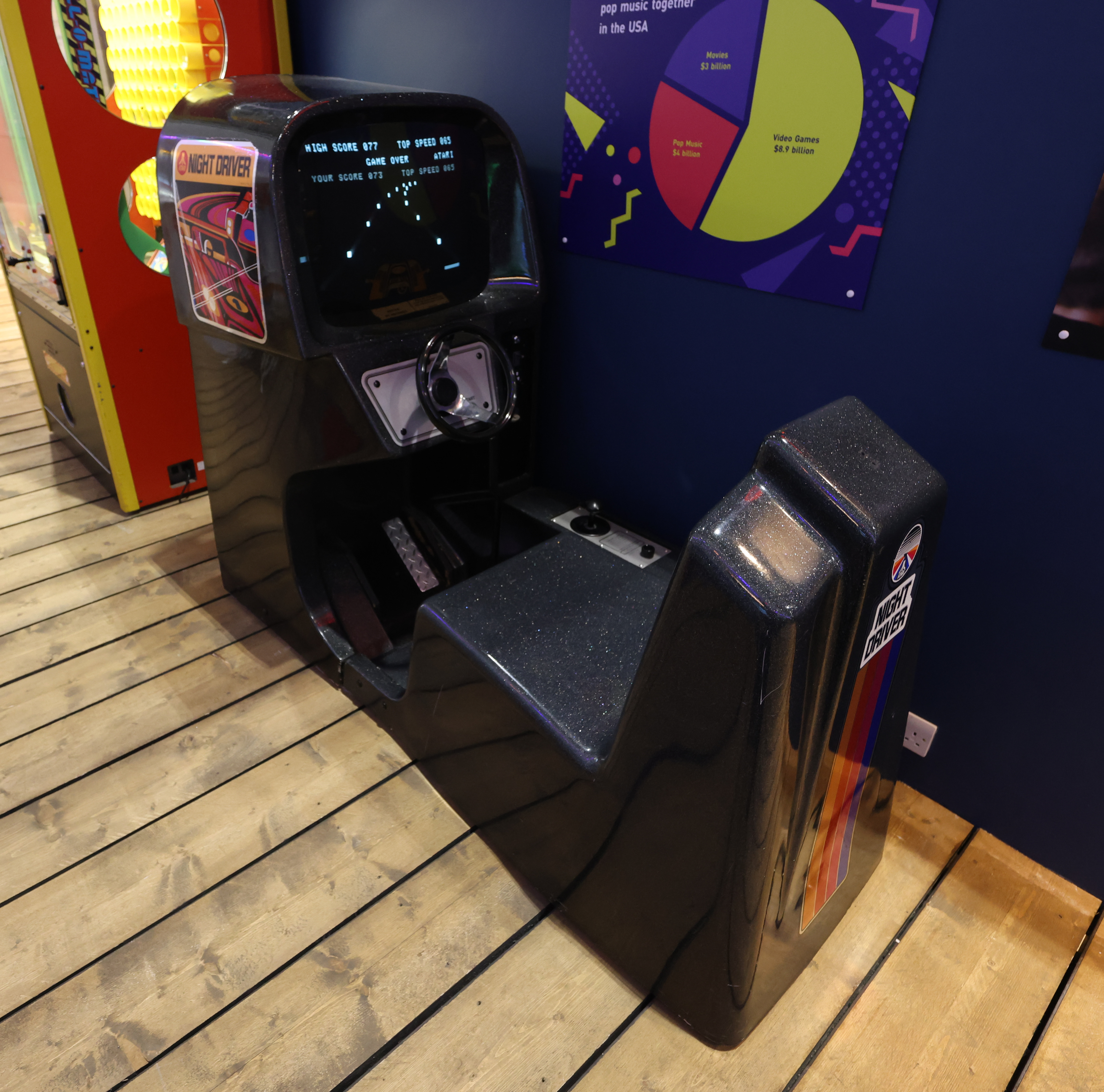
A Night Driver arcade machine

Two other first-person racing games were released shortly afterwards: Midway's Midnight Racer in November 1976 (later branded as Datsun 280 ZZZAP in March 1977) and Micronetics' Night Racer in March 1977.

Bill Budge wrote a Night Driver clone for the Apple II using the same name as the original.
