= The Art of Video Games =

2012 art exhibition in Washington, D.C.

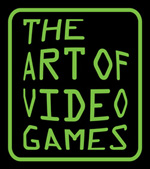
The Art of Video Games premiered at the Smithsonian American Art Museum in 2012.

The Art of Video Games was an exhibition by the Smithsonian American Art Museum which was on display from March 16 to September 30, 2012. The exhibition was designed to highlight the evolution of art within the video game medium over its forty-year history. Following its time at the Smithsonian American Art Museum, the exhibition toured to 10 additional venues in the United States. Chris Melissinos, founder of Past Pixels and collector of video games and gaming systems, was the curator of the exhibition.

== Purpose ==
The Art of Video Games was one of the first exhibitions to explore the forty-year evolution of video games as an artistic medium, with a focus on striking visual effects and the creative use of new technologies. It featured some of the most influential artists and designers during five eras of game technology, from early pioneers to contemporary designers (see grid below). The exhibition focused on the interplay of graphics, technology and storytelling through some of the best games for twenty gaming systems ranging from the Atari VCS to the PlayStation 3.

Smithsonian previously had coin-op arcade games on display in the mid-1980s, including the arcade video games Pong, Pac-Man and Dragon's Lair.

== Public vote ==
The Smithsonian American Art Museum invited the public to help select the video games to be included in the exhibition. The 240 games on the ballot were selected by Chris Melissinos, who worked with the museum and an advisory group consisting of game developers, designers, industry pioneers and journalists. The games were selected based on a variety of criteria, including visual effects, creative use of new technologies and how the game fit into the narrative of the exhibition. Voting took place between February 14 and April 17, 2011. More than 3.7 million votes were cast by 119,000 people in 175 countries.

== Galleries ==
Visitors to The Art of Video Games at the Smithsonian American Art Museum were greeted by a 12-foot projection that included excerpts from most of the 80 games featured in the exhibition with a chipmusic soundtrack written and recorded by 8 Bit Weapon and ComputeHer. An interior gallery included a series of short videos showing the range of emotional responses players of all ages have while interacting with games. Five themed videos addressing the themes of Beginnings, Inspiration, Narrative, Experience and The Future showcased excerpts from interviews with 20 influential figures in the gaming world—Nolan Bushnell, David Cage, Steve Cartwright, Jenova Chen, Don Daglow, Noah Falstein, Ed Fries, Ron Gilbert, Robin Hunicke, Henry Jenkins, Jennifer MacLean, RJ Mical, Mike Mika, David Perry, Jane Pinckard, George L. Rose, Kellee Santiago, Tim Schafer, Jesse Schell, Warren Spector and Tommy Tallarico. The videos are also available on the museum's website. A five-channel installation displaying advances in core mechanics illustrated how home video games have evolved dramatically since their introduction in the 1970s through elements like avatars, jumping, running, climbing, flying, cutscenes and landscapes. The room also held a selection of concept art from several games of different eras. Five playable games, one from each era, showed how players interact with diverse virtual worlds, highlighting innovative techniques that set the standard for many subsequent games. The playable games were Pac-Man, Super Mario Bros., The Secret of Monkey Island, Myst, and Flower. Interactive kiosks in the final gallery covered five eras of game technology, from early pioneers to contemporary designers, and 20 gaming systems from Atari VCS to PlayStation 3. Each kiosk featured a game from each of four genres—action, target, adventure and tactics—that visitors could select to listen to commentary, game dialogue and music.

== Games exhibited ==
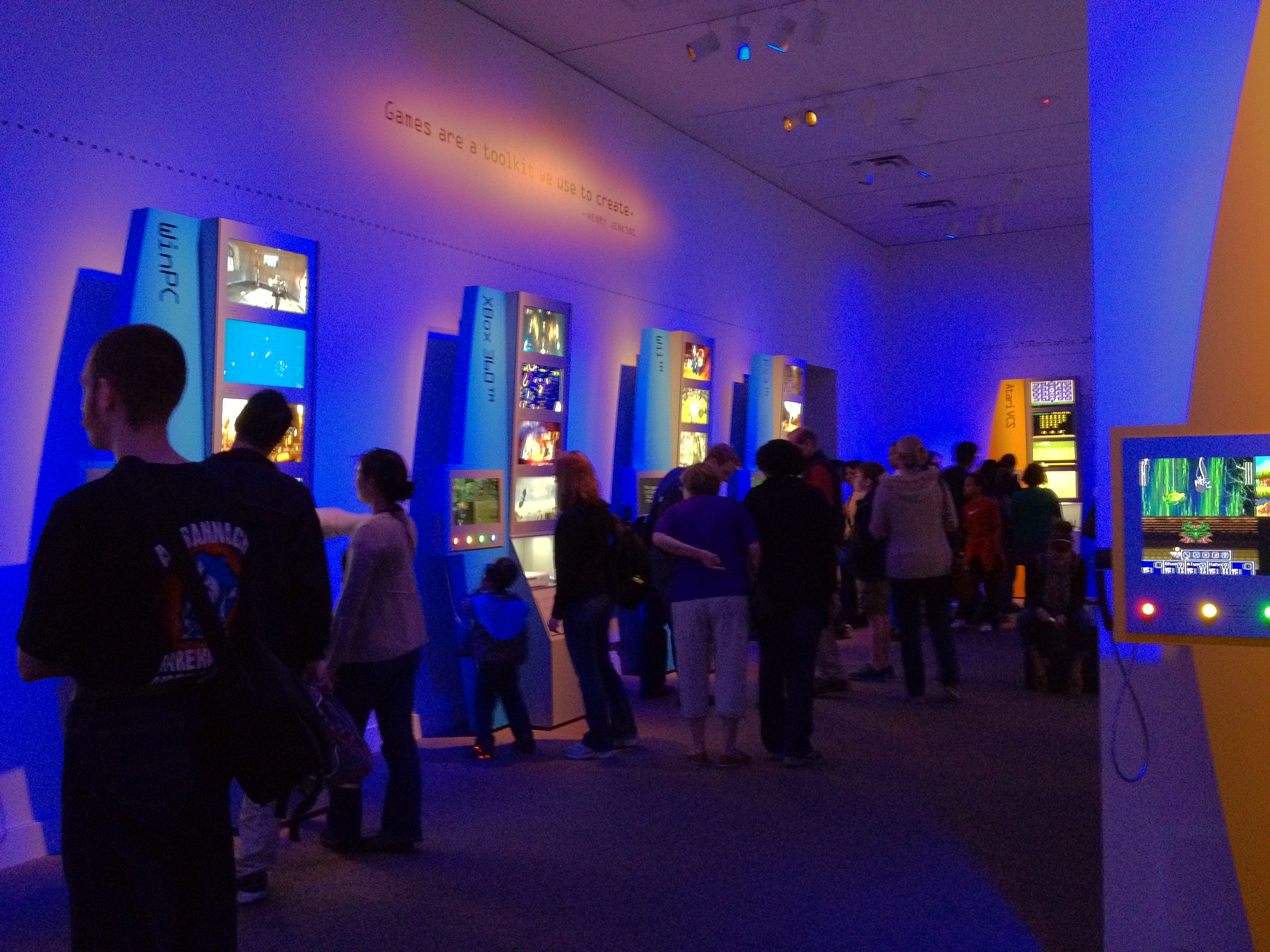
Visitors at the exhibit during its opening weekend at the Smithsonian American Art Museum

The following list of games are those that were selected by Melissinos and the advisory board for inclusion in the exhibition. The exhibition is divided into five chronological eras, showcasing platforms from within that era. For each platform, three games from each of four game genres were initially selected for inclusion, with one game determined by the public voting to be part of the final exhibition. In addition, playable versions of five games are available: Pac-Man, Super Mario Bros., The Secret of Monkey Island, Myst, and Flower.

=== Era 1: Start! (1970s–1983) ===
| Platform | Genre | Game | Year |
|---|---|---|---|
| Atari VCS | Target | Space Invaders | 1980 |
| Atari VCS | Target | Missile Command | 1981 |
| Atari VCS | Target | Yars' Revenge | 1981 |
| Atari VCS | Adventure | Adventure | 1980 |
| Atari VCS | Adventure | Pitfall! | 1982 |
| Atari VCS | Adventure | E.T. the Extra-Terrestrial | 1982 |
| Atari VCS | Action | Tunnel Runner | 1983 |
| Atari VCS | Action | Haunted House | 1981 |
| Atari VCS | Action | Pac-Man | 1981 |
| Atari VCS | Tactics | Combat | 1977 |
| Atari VCS | Tactics | Star Raiders | 1979 |
| Atari VCS | Tactics | Video Chess | 1979 |
| Colecovision | Target | Carnival | 1982 |
| Colecovision | Target | Zaxxon | 1982 |
| Colecovision | Target | Buck Rogers: Planet of Zoom | 1982 |
| Colecovision | Adventure | Alcazar: The Forgotten Fortress | 1985 |
| Colecovision | Adventure | Gateway to Apshai | 1983 |
| Colecovision | Adventure | Pitfall II: Lost Caverns | 1984 |
| Colecovision | Action | Donkey Kong | 1982 |
| Colecovision | Action | Jungle Hunt | 1983 |
| Colecovision | Action | Smurf: Rescue in Gargamel's Castle | 1982 |
| Colecovision | Tactics | Evolution | 1982 |
| Colecovision | Tactics | Star Trek: Strategic Operations Simulator | 1983 |
| Colecovision | Tactics | Artillery Duel | 1983 |
| Intellivision | Target | Demon Attack | 1982 |
| Intellivision | Target | Star Strike | 1981 |
| Intellivision | Target | Space Battle | 1979 |
| Intellivision | Adventure | Advanced Dungeons and Dragons | 1982 |
| Intellivision | Adventure | Swords and Serpents | 1982 |
| Intellivision | Adventure | Thunder Castle | 1986 |
| Intellivision | Action | Microsurgeon | 1982 |
| Intellivision | Action | Tron: Maze-A-Tron | 1982 |
| Intellivision | Action | Masters of the Universe: The Power of He-Man | 1983 |
| Intellivision | Tactics | Armor Battle | 1977 |
| Intellivision | Tactics | B-17 Bomber | 1982 |
| Intellivision | Tactics | Utopia | 1981 |

=== Era 2: 8-bit (1983–1989) ===
| Platform | Genre | Game | Year |
|---|---|---|---|
| Commodore 64 | Target | Attack of the Mutant Camels | 1983 |
| Commodore 64 | Target | Paradroid | 1985 |
| Commodore 64 | Target | Raid on Bungeling Bay | 1984 |
| Commodore 64 | Adventure | Wasteland | 1988 |
| Commodore 64 | Adventure | The Bard's Tale III: Thief of Fate | 1988 |
| Commodore 64 | Adventure | Zak McKracken and the Alien Mindbenders | 1988 |
| Commodore 64 | Action | Impossible Mission | 1984 |
| Commodore 64 | Action | Boulder Dash | 1984 |
| Commodore 64 | Action | Jumpman | 1983 |
| Commodore 64 | Tactics | M.U.L.E. | 1983 |
| Commodore 64 | Tactics | Little Computer People | 1985 |
| Commodore 64 | Tactics | Sid Meier's Pirates! | 1987 |
| Nintendo Entertainment; System | Target | 1943: The Battle of Midway | 1988 |
| Nintendo Entertainment; System | Target | Top Gun | 1987 |
| Nintendo Entertainment; System | Target | Life Force | 1987 |
| Nintendo Entertainment; System | Adventure | Final Fantasy | 1987 |
| Nintendo Entertainment; System | Adventure | The Legend of Zelda | 1986 |
| Nintendo Entertainment; System | Adventure | Shadowgate | 1987 |
| Nintendo Entertainment; System | Action | Mega Man 2 | 1988 |
| Nintendo Entertainment; System | Action | Super Mario Bros. 3 | 1988 |
| Nintendo Entertainment; System | Action | Metroid | 1986 |
| Nintendo Entertainment; System | Tactics | Archon: The Light and the Dark | 1983 |
| Nintendo Entertainment; System | Tactics | Desert Commander | 1989 |
| Nintendo Entertainment; System | Tactics | North and South | 1989 |
| Master System | Target | Fantasy Zone | 1986 |
| Master System | Target | After Burner | 1987 |
| Master System | Target | Missile Defense 3-D | 1987 |
| Master System | Adventure | Phantasy Star | 1987 |
| Master System | Adventure | Heroes of the Lance | 1988 |
| Master System | Adventure | Ultima IV: Quest of the Avatar | 1985 |
| Master System | Action | Shinobi | 1988 |
| Master System | Action | Land of Illusion starring Mickey Mouse | 1992 |
| Master System | Action | Marble Madness | 1984 |
| Master System | Tactics | Gain Ground | 1990 |
| Master System | Tactics | Spy vs. Spy | 1984 |
| Master System | Tactics | Rampart | 1991 |

=== Era 3: Bit Wars! (1989–1994) ===
| Platform | Genre | Game | Year |
|---|---|---|---|
| Sega Genesis | Target | Gunstar Heroes | 1993 |
| Sega Genesis | Target | Viewpoint | 1992 |
| Sega Genesis | Target | Ranger X | 1993 |
| Sega Genesis | Adventure | Phantasy Star IV | 1993 |
| Sega Genesis | Adventure | Flashback: The Quest for Identity | 1992 |
| Sega Genesis | Adventure | Shining Force 2 | 1993 |
| Sega Genesis | Action | Earthworm Jim | 1994 |
| Sega Genesis | Action | Sonic CD | 1993 |
| Sega Genesis | Action | Michael Jackson's Moonwalker | 1990 |
| Sega Genesis | Tactics | Herzog Zwei | 1990 |
| Sega Genesis | Tactics | Dune II: Battle for Arrakis | 1994 |
| Sega Genesis | Tactics | Nobunaga's Ambition | 1986 |
| Super Nintendo; Entertainment System | Target | Gradius III | 1990 |
| Super Nintendo; Entertainment System | Target | Star Fox | 1993 |
| Super Nintendo; Entertainment System | Target | Super Smash TV | 1991 |
| Super Nintendo; Entertainment System | Adventure | Chrono Trigger | 1995 |
| Super Nintendo; Entertainment System | Adventure | The Legend of Zelda: A Link to the Past | 1991 |
| Super Nintendo; Entertainment System | Adventure | EarthBound | 1995 |
| Super Nintendo; Entertainment System | Action | Super Star Wars | 1992 |
| Super Nintendo; Entertainment System | Action | Super Mario World | 1991 |
| Super Nintendo; Entertainment System | Action | Donkey Kong Country | 1994 |
| Super Nintendo; Entertainment System | Tactics | SimCity | 1989 |
| Super Nintendo; Entertainment System | Tactics | Syndicate | 1993 |
| Super Nintendo; Entertainment System | Tactics | Act Raiser | 1990 |

=== Era 4: Transition (1995–2002) ===
| Platform | Genre | Game | Year |
|---|---|---|---|
| IBM PC compatibles | Target | Star Wars: TIE Fighter | 1994 |
| IBM PC compatibles | Target | Crimson Skies | 2000 |
| IBM PC compatibles | Target | Diablo II | 2000 |
| IBM PC compatibles | Adventure | Baldur's Gate II: Shadows of Amn | 2000 |
| IBM PC compatibles | Adventure | Grim Fandango | 1998 |
| IBM PC compatibles | Adventure | Fallout | 1997 |
| IBM PC compatibles | Action | Deus Ex | 2000 |
| IBM PC compatibles | Action | Doom II | 1994 |
| IBM PC compatibles | Action | Unreal | 1998 |
| IBM PC compatibles | Tactics | Starcraft | 1998 |
| IBM PC compatibles | Tactics | Uplink: Hacker Elite | 2001 |
| IBM PC compatibles | Tactics | Command & Conquer | 1995 |
| Nintendo 64 | Target | Pilot Wings 64 | 1996 |
| Nintendo 64 | Target | Star Fox 64 (Note: Goldeneye 007 was the winning game in this category but cannot be displayed due to copyright restrictions. Star Fox 64 received the next highest number of votes.) | 1997 |
| Nintendo 64 | Target | GoldenEye 007 | 1997 |
| Nintendo 64 | Adventure | The Legend of Zelda: Ocarina of Time | 1998 |
| Nintendo 64 | Adventure | The Legend of Zelda: Majora's Mask | 2000 |
| Nintendo 64 | Adventure | Paper Mario | 2000–2001 |
| Nintendo 64 | Action | Super Mario 64 | 1996 |
| Nintendo 64 | Action | Banjo-Kazooie | 1998 |
| Nintendo 64 | Action | Shadows of the Empire | 1996 |
| Nintendo 64 | Tactics | Worms Armageddon | 1999 |
| Nintendo 64 | Tactics | Tom Clancy's Rainbow Six | 1998 |
| Nintendo 64 | Tactics | Ogre Battle 64: Person of Lordly Caliber | 1999 |
| Dreamcast | Target | Toy Commander | 1999 |
| Dreamcast | Target | Typing of the Dead | 1999 |
| Dreamcast | Target | Rez | 2001 |
| Dreamcast | Adventure | Shenmue | 1999 |
| Dreamcast | Adventure | Phantasy Star Online | 2000 |
| Dreamcast | Adventure | Skies of Arcadia | 2000 |
| Dreamcast | Action | Jet Grind Radio | 2000 |
| Dreamcast | Action | Sonic Adventure | 1998 |
| Dreamcast | Action | Crazy Taxi | 1999 |
| Dreamcast | Tactics | ChuChu Rocket! | 1999 |
| Dreamcast | Tactics | Panzer Front | 1999 |
| Dreamcast | Tactics | Rhapsody of Zephyr | 2001 |
| Saturn | Target | Panzer Dragoon II Zwei | 1996 |
| Saturn | Target | Black Fire | 1995 |
| Saturn | Target | Wing Arms | 1995 |
| Saturn | Adventure | Blazing Dragons | 2000 |
| Saturn | Adventure | Dark Savior | 2000 |
| Saturn | Adventure | Panzer Dragoon Saga | 1998 |
| Saturn | Action | NiGHTS into Dreams... | 1996 |
| Saturn | Action | Tomb Raider | 1996 |
| Saturn | Action | Clockwork Knight | 2000 |
| Saturn | Tactics | SimCity 2000 | 1999 |
| Saturn | Tactics | Blazing Heroes | 1999 |
| Saturn | Tactics | Command and Conquer | 1995 |
| PlayStation | Target | Einhander | 1998 |
| PlayStation | Target | Colony Wars III: Red Sun | 2000 |
| PlayStation | Target | Point Blank | 1998 |
| PlayStation | Adventure | Lunar: Silver Star Story Complete | 1996 |
| PlayStation | Adventure | Final Fantasy VII | 1997 |
| PlayStation | Adventure | Grandia | 1997 |
| PlayStation | Action | Metal Gear Solid | 1998 |
| PlayStation | Action | Crash Bandicoot: Warped | 1998 |
| PlayStation | Action | Oddworld: Abe's Oddysee | 1997 |
| PlayStation | Tactics | Final Fantasy Tactics | 1997 |
| PlayStation | Tactics | Carnage Heart | 1997 |
| PlayStation | Tactics | Command and Conquer: Red Alert | 1996 |

=== Era 5: Next Generation (2003–current) ===
| Platform | Genre | Game | Year |
|---|---|---|---|
| Xbox | Target | Panzer Dragoon Orta | 2002 |
| Xbox | Target | Xyanide | 2006 |
| Xbox | Target | Sniper Elite: Berlin 1945 | 2005 |
| Xbox | Adventure | Fable | 2004 |
| Xbox | Adventure | Indigo Prophecy | 2005 |
| Xbox | Adventure | Shenmue II | 2001 |
| Xbox | Action | Halo 2 | 2004 |
| Xbox | Action | Jet Set Radio Future | 2002 |
| Xbox | Action | Psychonauts | 2005 |
| Xbox | Tactics | Steel Battalion | 2002 |
| Xbox | Tactics | Tom Clancy's Splinter Cell | 2002 |
| Xbox | Tactics | Sid Meier's Pirates! | 2004 |
| Xbox 360 | Target | Geometry Wars 2: Retro Evolved | 2008 |
| Xbox 360 | Target | Ikaruga | 2002 |
| Xbox 360 | Target | Assault Heroes 2 | 2008 |
| Xbox 360 | Adventure | Mass Effect 2 | 2010 |
| Xbox 360 | Adventure | Limbo | 2010 |
| Xbox 360 | Adventure | The Elder Scrolls IV: Oblivion | 2006 |
| Xbox 360 | Action | Gears of War 2 | 2008 |
| Xbox 360 | Action | Halo 3 | 2007 |
| Xbox 360 | Action | BioShock | 2007 |
| Xbox 360 | Tactics | Halo Wars | 2009 |
| Xbox 360 | Tactics | Darwinia+ | 2010 |
| Xbox 360 | Tactics | The Lord of the Rings: The Battle for Middle-earth II | 2006 |
| Modern Windows | Target | Shatter | 2009 |
| Modern Windows | Target | Everyday Shooter | 2007 |
| Modern Windows | Target | flOw | 2006 |
| Modern Windows | Adventure | World of Warcraft | 2004 |
| Modern Windows | Adventure | Star Wars: Knights of the Old Republic | 2003 |
| Modern Windows | Adventure | Fallout 3 | 2008 |
| Modern Windows | Action | Half-Life 2 | 2004 |
| Modern Windows | Action | Portal | 2007 |
| Modern Windows | Action | Call of Duty: World at War | 2008 |
| Modern Windows | Tactics | StarCraft II: Wings of Liberty | 2010 |
| Modern Windows | Tactics | Age of Empires III | 2005 |
| Modern Windows | Tactics | Minecraft | 2009 |
| GameCube | Target | P.N.03 | 2003 |
| GameCube | Target | Star Fox Assault | 2005 |
| GameCube | Target | Alien Hominid | 2004 |
| GameCube | Adventure | The Legend of Zelda: The Wind Waker | 2003 |
| GameCube | Adventure | Tales of Symphonia | 2003 |
| GameCube | Adventure | Paper Mario: The Thousand-Year Door | 2004 |
| GameCube | Action | Prince of Persia: The Sands of Time | 2003 |
| GameCube | Action | Eternal Darkness: Sanity's Requiem | 2002 |
| GameCube | Action | Metroid Prime 2: Echoes | 2004 |
| GameCube | Tactics | Battalion Wars | 2005 |
| GameCube | Tactics | Pikmin 2 | 2004 |
| GameCube | Tactics | Fire Emblem: Path of Radiance | 2005 |
| Wii | Target | Boom Blox | 2008 |
| Wii | Target | Blast Works: Build, Trade, Destroy | 2008 |
| Wii | Target | Sin and Punishment: Star Successor | 2010 |
| Wii | Adventure | The Legend of Zelda: Twilight Princess | 2006 |
| Wii | Adventure | Super Paper Mario | 2007 |
| Wii | Adventure | Monster Hunter Tri | 2010 |
| Wii | Action | Super Mario Galaxy 2 | 2010 |
| Wii | Action | Metroid Prime: Trilogy | 2009 |
| Wii | Action | Epic Mickey | 2010 |
| Wii | Tactics | Zack and Wiki: Quest for Barbados' Treasure | 2007 |
| Wii | Tactics | Little King's Story | 2009 |
| Wii | Tactics | Battalion Wars 2 | 2007 |
| PlayStation 2 | Target | Silpheed: The Lost Planet | 2001 |
| PlayStation 2 | Target | Espgaluda | 2004 |
| PlayStation 2 | Target | Gradius V | 2004 |
| PlayStation 2 | Adventure | Final Fantasy X | 2001 |
| PlayStation 2 | Adventure | Kingdom Hearts II | 2006 |
| PlayStation 2 | Adventure | Ōkami | 2006 |
| PlayStation 2 | Action | Tony Hawk's Underground 2 | 2004 |
| PlayStation 2 | Action | God of War | 2005 |
| PlayStation 2 | Action | Shadow of the Colossus | 2005 |
| PlayStation 2 | Tactics | Metal Gear Solid 2: Sons of Liberty | 2001 |
| PlayStation 2 | Tactics | Tom Clancy's Rainbow Six: Lockdown | 2005 |
| PlayStation 2 | Tactics | Armored Core 3 | 2002 |
| PlayStation 3 | Target | Flower | 2009 |
| PlayStation 3 | Target | Super Stardust HD | 2007 |
| PlayStation 3 | Target | PixelJunk Shooter | 2009 |
| PlayStation 3 | Adventure | Dragon Age: Origins | 2009 |
| PlayStation 3 | Adventure | Final Fantasy XIII | 2009 |
| PlayStation 3 | Adventure | Heavy Rain | 2010 |
| PlayStation 3 | Action | Uncharted 2: Among Thieves | 2009 |
| PlayStation 3 | Action | Call of Duty: Black Ops | 2010 |
| PlayStation 3 | Action | LittleBigPlanet 2 | 2011 |
| PlayStation 3 | Tactics | Brütal Legend | 2009 |
| PlayStation 3 | Tactics | Command & Conquer: Red Alert 3 – Commander's Challenge | 2009 |
| PlayStation 3 | Tactics | Sid Meier's Civilization Revolution | 2008 |

== Subsequent exhibitions ==
Following its time at the Smithsonian, the exhibit was also shown at ten other venues across the United States, between 2013 and 2016.

- Smithsonian American Art Museum in Washington, D.C. (March 16, 2012 – September 30, 2012)
- Boca Raton Museum of Art in Boca Raton, Florida (October 24, 2012 – January 13, 2013)
- EMP Museum in Seattle, Washington (February 16, 2013 – May 13, 2013)
- Phoenix Art Museum in Phoenix, Arizona (June 16, 2013 – September 29, 2013)
- Everson Museum of Art in Syracuse, New York (October 25, 2013 – January 19, 2014)
- Hudson River Museum in Yonkers, New York (February 15, 2014 – May 18, 2014)
- Toledo Museum of Art in Toledo, Ohio (June 19, 2014 – September 28, 2014)
- Flint Institute of Arts in Flint, Michigan (October 25, 2014 – January 18, 2015)
- Chrysler Museum of Art in Norfolk, Virginia (February 13, 2015 – May 10, 2015)
- Memphis Brooks Museum of Art in Memphis, Tennessee (June 6, 2015 – September 13, 2015)
- The Patricia and Phillip Frost Art Museum at Florida International University in Miami, Florida (October 9, 2015 – January 25, 2016)

== Book ==
A companion book, The Art of Video Games: From Pac-Man to Mass Effect, accompanies the exhibition. It is written by Chris Melissinos, with a foreword by Elizabeth Broun, director of the Smithsonian American Art Museum and an introduction by Mike Mika, head of development for Other Ocean Interactive and a prominent advocate for the preservation of video game history. It also includes more than 100 composite images of games created by Patrick O'Rourke. The book was published by Welcome Books in cooperation with the Smithsonian American Art Museum.

== Reception ==
An estimated 680,000 visitors came to the Smithsonian exhibit during its six-month display period.

== See also ==
- Game On – a similar exhibition that explores the historical development of video games
- Game Masters (exhibition) – a similar exhibition at the Australian Centre for the Moving Image that explores key designers of the video game medium
- List of video games in the Museum of Modern Art – a list of video games in a similar, but smaller exhibition of the Museum of Modern Art
