= Fathom (video game) =

1983 video game

- Atari 2600 box art
- Developers: Imagic; Interphase Technologies (MSX)
- Publishers: Imagic; Texas Instruments (TI-99/4A); Toshiba EMI (MSX)
- Designer: Rob Fulop
- Programmers: Rob Fulop: Atari 2600; Rob Fulop; Intellivision; Dave Durran; TI-99/4A; Neil McKenzie; ColecoVision; Mark Voorsanger
- Artists: Michael Becker, Wilfredo Aguilar
- Platforms: Atari 2600, Intellivision, TI-99/4A, ColecoVision, MSX
- Release: August 1983: Atari 2600; August 1983; Intellivision; October 1983; TI99/4A; March 1984; ColecoVision; May 1984; MSX; JP: 1985
- Genre: Action-adventure
- Mode: Single-player

Fathom is a 1983 action-adventure game developed and published by Imagic for the Atari 2600. It was designed by Rob Fulop as his last game for Imagic and is one of the last home console games Imagic developed. It was later ported to the Intellivision, ColecoVision, TI 99/4A, and MSX. The player assumes the role of a shapeshifter named Proteus, who can take the form of a dolphin below water as well as a seagull above. The dolphin gathers seahorses while avoiding octopuses, and the seagull collects pink clouds while avoiding volcanic eruptions. Fulfilling these tasks yields the starfish needed to acquire the shards of a trident and save the mermaid Neptina.

Development of Fathom was strained initially by a lack of creative direction. Fulop wanted to create a game about deep sea treasure hunting but ran into technical difficulties rending a convincing scuba diver. A single drawing of a jumping dolphin, created by artist Michael Becker, sparked inspiration and drove the direction of the game into fantasy. The seagull's flight mechanics were directly inspired by the coin-op game Joust.

Upon release, contemporary reviewers praised the vibrant visual presentation and animations, though critics were divided on the repetitive nature of the gameplay loops. Some reviewers were fond of the way the game expands on each loop. Others found the movement to be a frustrating sore spot. Retrospective reception has been generally positive, highlighting the game as a technical and artistic achievement for the Atari 2600 hardware.

== Gameplay ==
Proteus's two playable forms, the seagull and dolphin, meet to exchange control. With the complete trident, Proteus can swim to the ocean bottom and save Neptina.

The objective is to free the mermaid Neptina, daughter of Neptune, who has been trapped at the bottom of the sea by the Titans. The player character is a shapeshifter named Proteus who must recover the shattered pieces of Neptune's trident to break Neptina's cage.

The player starts the game in the form of a dolphin and can swim freely between several different ocean screens. They have a limited amount of time to collect all three shards of the broken trident and return them to the mermaid's cage at the bottom of the map. As a dolphin, The player is tasked with collecting all the seahorses that appear on a certain screen, while avoiding octopuses and seaweed beds. Once all the seahorses are collected, the player can obtain a starfish which will give them one piece of the trident. Collecting enough seahorses will also cause a bird icon to appear at the bottom of the screen. Returning to the top of the screen with this icon will allow the player to start controlling a seagull above the water.

As a seagull, the player can fly around a new set of screens above the water while avoiding black birds and volcanic eruptions. Collecting enough pink clouds will cause more starfish to appear, which grants the player another trident piece. Obtaining all three trident pieces and sufficient clouds will make a fish symbol appear at the bottom of the screen, allowing the player to transform back into a dolphin and swim down to Neptina's cage to finish a loop. Every time one game loop is completed, the number of screens on the map increases and the player must travel further to accomplish their objectives. Once the player completes seven loops, the game is over and a secret ending is revealed.

== Development ==
=== Background ===
Fathom was designed by Rob Fulop for Imagic. In 1983, he wrote an article for Video Games magazine titled "An Act of Creation" where he detailed his account of the game's development. Fulop was a former developer for Atari, who had left disgruntled to form Imagic with Dennis Koble and Bob Smith. His first game there was Demon Attack, a bestseller for Imagic. Development started on Fathom in September 1982, three months after he finished his last game Cosmic Ark. In that gap, he developed a game called Cubicolor, which Imagic decided not to release. According to Fulop, this was because it didn't have the right "market appeal" and it tested poorly with focus groups.

=== Concept ===
In "An Act of Creation", Fulop said all of his games started with an on-screen "effect", i.e. "something that looks interesting and catches the eye." He wanted to make a game that had something to do with descending into water. Themes of scuba diving and treasure hunting were locked in early, but he had a hard time deciding on design concepts from there. Fulop claims he did extensive reading of related fiction to learn more about buried treasure and "the lore of the sea." He was pulled towards ideas of "exploration" and "adventure" but wanted to avoid the complexity he saw as common to those genres, saying "what I wanted was to create something that was easy to play right away." He also wanted to create something cute that didn't involve shooting. He was drawn to the idea that a game could be "basically a little movie, or cartoon" where the player could take control of the main characters. In an interview with The Video Game Update, Fulop claimed he created "a game that's designed to look more like a cartoon than any other type of video game."

The code was based on Bob Smith's work on Riddle of the Sphinx. Fulop says he started by changing all of the desert elements into underwater elements. By his account, the original player character was a scuba diver who carried air tanks, shovels, and maps. Fulop spent four weeks designing the character but couldn't fit enough detail into the Atari 2600's sprites. He wasn't pleased with the held objects, which were often as big as the player, and couldn't get to the diver to turn convincingly.

Game artist Michael Becker, who had previously worked with Fulop on Demon Attack and Cosmic Ark, came up with an image of a dolphin jumping out of the water. Fulop frequently cites this dolphin image as the point of inspiration for the game's core concepts. The dolphin was easier to draw and added an element of fantasy, which freed up the creative process. Becker also suggested adding a mermaid, which fit the new fantasy theme. Fulop played with several ideas to turn this concept into a full game, including adding bazookas and turning it into a shoot 'em up. Fulop claims "the real breakthrough" came when he added a seagull to the title screen as a background detail. Later, he became inspired after playing "a lot of Joust" at a local arcade, and decided to implement that game's flight mechanics.

=== Final product ===
In Fathom, all of the graphics were designed by Michael Becker and Wilfredo Aguilar, a first for Fulop, who was used to doing at least some of the graphical design. Fulop claims Imagic's advertising agency helped him put together the structure of the final game in preparation for Summer CES 1983. Within the last three weeks leading up to the event, Fulop recounts his biggest limitation being time. He describes working longer hours each day and being frustrated by the discovery of new bugs. After Imagic's bug testers reported "no problems found" for a week, it was declared finished. Fulop estimated the game took approximately three months to ship after that.

In an 1993 interview, Fulop described being frustrated with the way control of the dolphin transitioned to the seagull. He had wanted to create a more dramatic transition between the two gameplay states, but this would have cut part of the dolphin jumping animation Becker had designed. This alteration was rejected by his supervisor, Dennis Koble, and Imagic CEO Bill Grubb. Fulop claims this incident caused him to dislike the game following its release. By the time "An Act of Creation" was printed for Video Games' December 1983 issue, Fulop had left Imagic.

The game contains an Easter egg. Under the right conditions, the initials of the three developers (Rob Fulop, Michael Becker, and Wilfredo Aguilar) can replace the rocks spewing from the erupting volcano. All three names are also printed in full on the box art. Fulop said players had responded well to Easter eggs in other games, so he took advantage of the spacious 8 KB ROM cartridge to add secrets.

== Release ==
Fathom was first shown at Summer CES in June 1983, along with five other original games. Versions for the Atari 2600, Intellivision, and ColecoVision were announced. Imagic also announced conversions for the Commodore VIC-20 and Atari 8-bit computers. By this time, cartridges were already in production. The game released for the Atari 2600 in August 1983. The other versions were planned to release in the Fall. It was marketed with a contest where participants were asked to count the number of tridents in a press advertisement and on the back of the box.

As a joint venture with Texas Instruments (TI), Imagic announced a release for the TI-99/4A home computer, slated for January 1984. A few weeks after announcing the venture, TI announced losses in the millions and TI stock plummeted. The TI-99/4A version released in March 1984. By that point, TI had already announced it was ending production on the system. The TI version was released as a cartridge with compatibility with the TI Speech Synthesizer. During gameplay, players hear the voice of Neptuna giving advice and asking to be freed. It was published by Texas Instruments and programmed by Neil McKenzie.

Due to the video game crash of 1983, Imagic had laid off most of its staff by October 1983 and announced they had become exclusively a "game design house". In practice, this meant Imagic began transitioning into the computer software business. A version for the Intellivision by Dave Durran was released later in 1983. A version for the ColecoVision programmed by Mark Voorsanger with graphics by Matthew Sarconi was released in May 1984. An MSX version was developed by Interphase Technologies and released in Japan by Toshiba EMI. Versions for the VIC-20, Atari 8-bit, and 5200 were never released.

== Reception ==
Reception

Review scores
Publication	Score
Electronic Fun with Computers & Games	2.5/4
JoyStik	4/5
San Francisco Chronicle	3/5

Fathom was frequently praised for its graphics and animation. Jim Clark of Videogaming & Computergaming Illustrated called the graphics "wildly impressive, even beautiful", and E.C. Meade described the animations as "simply outstanding". Mike Wilson of The Logical Gamer praised the graphics but didn't think they exceeded those of other Atari 2600 games. Electronic Games called it a "wonderfully graphic" work. Joystik magazine complimented the "superb graphics", "rich and vibrant colors", and "fluid movement."

Critics were more mixed about gameplay. Computer Entertainer gave a perfect score in gameplay and graphics, describing the game as a great adventure and praising its expansion with each loop. The San Francisco Chronicle also thought the way the game expands was a great feature. Alan R. Bechtold of the The Logical Gamer agreed with this sentiment and was impressed by how much was fit into the cartridge. However, Bechtold's co-reviewer Mike Wilson described the gameplay as boring once mastered and advised players to avoid the game. Electronic Fun with Computers & Games described the game as "monotonous" and "tremendously dull". Dan Persons in Video Games magazine gave it high praise. He wrote that Fulop took the "give 'em enough rope and they'll hang themselves" approach to the game design by allowing players to roam wherever they want within a set time limit. He thought the gameplay was rewarding, the graphics "excellent" and "well animated" and only wished there were a way to skip the early levels on repeat playthroughs.

United Kingdom based magazine TV Gamer thought it was "unusual" and "a simple challenging concept with good graphics." TeleMatch like the game citing its excellent graphics and animation, expansive world, and effective scenario. Italian Videogiochi described it as a very challenging game, describing the controls as unintuitive and complaining about having to restart tasks after accidentally leaving the current screen. French magazine Tilt said the ColecoVision version was a high point for games for that system.

Retrospectively, Levi Buchanan writing for IGN praised Fulop's work on the game as "perhaps his greatest achievement on the 2600" and called the graphics "beautiful" and "elegant". He thought Fathom was one of the five best games Imagic made for the Atari 2600. In 2007, Brett Weiss wrote that "good controls, excellent graphics, and original gameplay make Fathom a winner."

== See Also ==
- Dolphin
- No Escape!
- List of Atari 2600 games
