= Microsurgeon =

Microsurgeon may refer to:

- Microsurgeon (video game), a 1982 Intellivision video game by Imagic
- Microsurgeon, a surgeon who specializes in microsurgery
