= Laser Gates =

1983 video game

- North American box art
- Developer: VentureVision
- Publisher: Imagic
- Designer: Dan Oliver
- Platforms: Atari 2600; Atari 8-bit (Imagic 1-2-3)
- Release: October 1983 (2600); June 1984 (Atari 8-bit)
- Genre: Horizontally scrolling shooter
- Mode: Single-player

Laser Gates is a 1983 horizontally scrolling shooter video game published by Imagic for the Atari 2600. Players control the Dante Dart, a space ship tasked with shutting down the Cryptic Computer, a peace keeping device that went rouge. Players navigate a cavern while avoiding enemies and force fields. It was designed by Dan Oliver, a former Games by Apollo developer, for the short lived company VentureVision following their first and only release, Rescue Terra I. At the time, its title was Innerspace. Imagic renamed it and released it in October 1983. At the same time, Imagic was announcing a pivot away for home console video games, making Laser Gates one of Imagic's last Atari 2600 releases, along with Quick Step and Wing War. All three games were ported to the Atari 8-bit computer and packaged as Imagic 1-2-3 in 1984.

Laser Gates received poor critical reception. Common points of criticism are the lack of screen space afforded by the four bars at the bottom of the screen and lack of novelty and replayability compared to other similar horizontally scrolling shooters, such as Vanguard. Some critic praise the graphics and large variety of enemies. Overall critics consider it to be a "pretty standard" scrolling shooter.

== Gameplay ==
Laser Gates is a horizontally scrolling shooter. Players control the Dante Dart, a shape ship infiltrating the caverns of the Cryptic Computer to destroy four Failsafe Detonators. The Cryptic Computer is a peace keeping device that has gone rouge, and whose fail safe protections are now preventing the Dante Dart from shutting it down. A variety of enemies threaten the players, along with the eponymous laser gates, which come in three varieties and must be navigated through. At the bottom of the screen are four status bars, "Score", "Energy", "Shields", and "D-Time". Energy depletes as the player uses the Dante Darts laser fire and can be replenished by collecting energy pods found throughout the cavern. "Shields" deplete every time the ship is hit but are partially replenished with every 10,000 points earned. "D-Time" depletes over time until empty, at which point the game is over. The game is completed once four detonators have been destroyed. Detonators bear the number 6507 on them, a reference to the MOS 6507 microprocessor inside the Atari 2600.

The Dante Dart at the top of the screen faces two force fields with gaps. Four bars take up the bottom half of the screen.

== Development & release ==
Laser Gates was designed and programmed by Dan Oliver, who originally developed it under the title Innerspace at VentureVision. Oliver was a former developer at Games by Apollo where he developed Space Canyon. Before Apollo went bankrupt, Oliver says he left looking for somewhere with better financial compensation. He found a newspaper ad for crew looking to create a video game startup. He joined this new Texas-based company called VentureVision, which was founded in November 1982 by Robert Hessler. For VentureVision, Oliver designed Rescue Terra I, the only game the company published before being swept away by the video game crash of 1983. According to Oliver, 20,000 Rescue Terra I cartridges were produced but only 384 were sold. Oliver's next project for the company was titled Innerspace, a sequel to Rescue Terra I that was planned for release alongside a third game in the trilogy, Solar Defense, in April 1983. Before it ever released, VentureVision went under and Oliver decided to approach Imagic who published the game instead.

Imagic renamed it to Laser Gates and announced it for release in Fall 1983 along with five other games. These games ended up being the last six games Imagic published for home consoles. Laser Gates was released in October 1983 for the Atari 2600, at the same time as Imagic was announcing a pivot into home computer software. According to Oliver, the Imagic offices were already barren by the time he approached them, "my golden touch continued - 3 games, 3 companies out of business!" Oliver claims Imagic was in Chapter 11 bankruptcy at the time, although the company lasted at least two more years and is not known to have ever been in bankruptcy. Laser Gates was one of three games included in Imagic 1-2-3, a June 1984 release by Imagic for Atari 8-bit computers, along with Wing War and Quick Step. It was also released in European countries such as Italy, France, and Germany.

== Reception ==
The Video Game Update called Laser Gates a "very pretty" game with challenging action. But that its inability to distinguish itself for other horizontally scrolling shooters meant it lost interest quickly. In Videogaming and Computer Gaming Illustrated both E.C. Meade and Jim Clark thought the game brought nothing new to the genre and wasn't worth anyone's time. Mark Brownstein in Video Games was highly critical, complaining about the lack of novelty, the anticlimactic confrontation with the final computer, and the gauges taking up large portions of the screen. He said "this one is only for 2600 owners who want to shoot their own machines or for those crazies who must have every horizontal-scrolling shoot-up." Retrospectively, Brett Weiss said "it plays more than a little like Vanguard, but it's not as much fun."

German magazine TeleMatch complimented the graphical presentation and the variety of enemies though couldn't be sure how it would up over the long run. Italian magazine Videogiochi thought it wasn't very original but called it an enjoyable game with well-executed graphics. They also complained about the manual, which they thought was sparse on description and illustration. French magazine Tilt gave it five out six stars for interest, three out of six stars for graphics, and three out of six stars for sound.

Electronic Games reviewed Imagic 1-2-3, a collection containing Laser Gates, Wing War, and Quick Step, in 1985. They said of the package "this disk is for people who enjoy getting more bang for the buck even though none of these three games stand up well on its own." They said Laser Gates was a "pretty standard scrolling shoot-out." Computer Entertainer considered Laser Gates to be the weakest of the three in the package.
