= Beauty & the Beast (1982 video game) =

- Developer: Imagic
- Publisher: Imagic
- Designer: Wendell Brown
- Platform: Intellivision
- Release: October 1982
- Genre: Platform
- Mode: Single-player

Beauty & the Beast is a platform game written by Wendell Brown for the Intellivision and released in 1982 by Imagic. It is a single-player game with a concept similar to Nintendo's Donkey Kong.

== Gameplay ==
In the game, the player takes the role of Bashful Buford who must save Tiny Mabel from the giant Horrible Hank. In order to save Tiny Mabel, the player must climb up a building while avoiding objects thrown by Horrible Hank. Hearts come from Mabel which makes Buford invincible for a short time. Once the player saves Mabel, the giant dies by falling off the building.

Intellivision Lives! released an emulated version bundled with Shark! Shark! and B-17 Bomber.

== Reception ==
In How to Win at Home Video Games, the reviewer wrote: "Beauty and the Beast is actually Imagic's answer Donkey Kong's theme, 'climb the building to save the girl.' Surprising, however, it's a beauty of a game that we recommend to video beasts of all skill levels."

It was also reviewed by TeleMatch and Tilt.
