= Open Wonderland =

3D toolkit for making collaborative virtual worlds

- Original authors: Open Wonderland Foundation, Sun Microsystems
- Preview release: 0.5 User Preview 4 (2010-0_5_A4) / May 2010; 16 years ago
- Written in: Java
- Operating system: Cross-platform
- Platform: Java
- Type: Virtual world, 3D computer graphics, Collaboration
- License: GPL v2 with the "Classpath" exception
- Website: http://openwonderland.org

Open Wonderland (originally Project Wonderland) is an open-source toolkit written in Java for creating collaborative 3D virtual worlds.

Project Wonderland had been funded by Sun Microsystems since its early development. On January 27, 2010, Sun Microsystems was acquired by Oracle who decided to cease funding. Project Wonderland continued as an independent community-supported open-source project named "Open Wonderland".

== See also ==
- jMonkeyEngine - used internally by OWL
- Project Darkstar - The Sun Game Server
- Croquet Project
- OpenSimulator - another open source server platform for virtual worlds.
