= Chris Melissinos =

American programmer

Christopher Melissinos
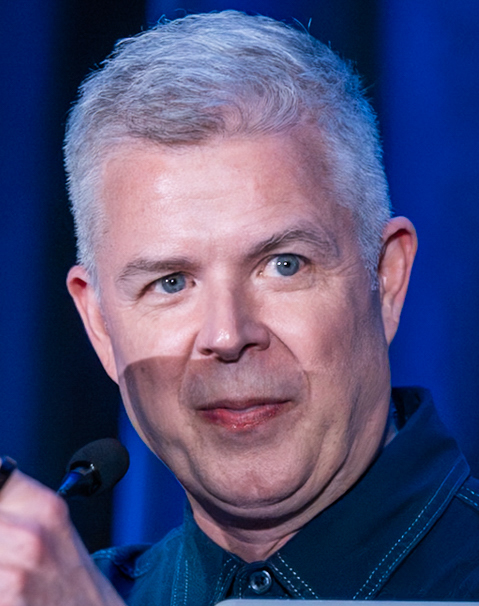
- Melissinos at the Game Developers Conference in 2026
- Born: New York, New York
- Citizenship: American; Greek
- Known for: Chief Gaming Officer at Sun; Founder of Javagaming.org; Guest Curator and Creator of "The Art of Video Games" at the Smithsonian American Art Museum
- Awards: 13th Annual Game Developers Choice Awards - Industry Ambassador
- Scientific career
- Fields: Computer gaming Computer science
- Workplaces: Sun Microsystems

Christopher Robert Melissinos is a Java programmer who served as Sun Microsystems' Chief Evangelist and Chief Gaming Officer. During his tenure at Sun, he was responsible for the creation of their Game Technologies Group and was a driving political force behind the formation of several open source Java gaming technologies including Project Darkstar, and Java bindings for OpenGL, OpenAL and Jinput.

He was the host of JavaOne in 2009.

== The Art of Video Games Exhibition ==
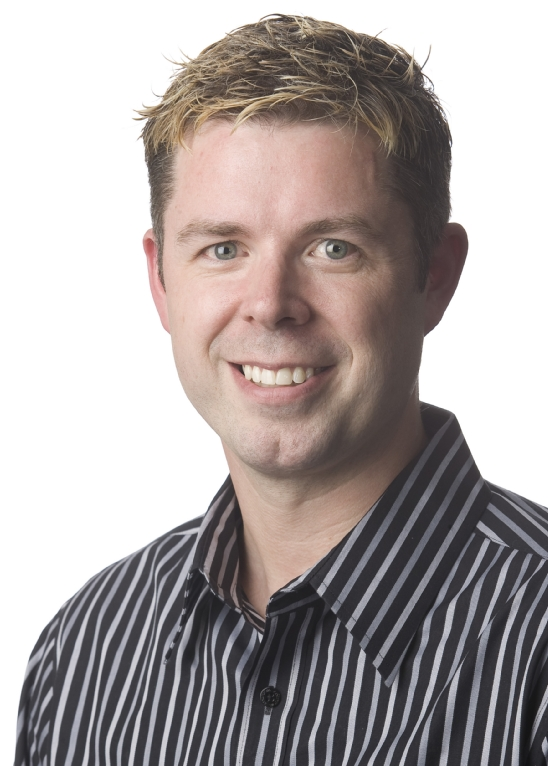
Melissinos c. 2009

"The Art of Video Games" exhibition opened at the Smithsonian American Art Museum on March 16, 2012 and closed on September 30, 2012. This exhibition became one of the most successful exhibitions in the history of the museum, attracting more than 23,000 visitors during its opening weekend and more than 680,000 visitors in its 6-month run at the museum.

The exhibit's goal was to examine the influence of art and popular culture on video games, and the subsequent reflection of video games on culture with titles spanning over four decades of gaming. Chris Melissinos is the exhibit curator and he assembled an advisory group made up of experts, developers, and journalists in the interactive entertainment industry. to offer suggestions and opinions in the structure of the exhibition.

Additionally, there was a public vote for the final 80 games, out of 240, that were presented in the exhibition to allow for the inclusion of Melissinos' "Three Voices of Video Games" thesis in the selection process itself. This public vote ran from February 14, 2011 through April 17, 2011 and received more than 3.7 million votes from 119,000 people in 175 countries.

Considered to be one of the standout art exhibitions of 2012, The Art of Video Games exhibition toured across the US into 2016.

== Industry Awards ==
On March 25, 2013, Chris Melissinos was presented at the Game Developers Choice Awards with the "Ambassador Award" for 2013. The Ambassador Award honors an individual or individuals who have helped the game industry advance to a better place, either through facilitating a better game community from within, or by reaching outside the industry to be an advocate for video games and help further our art. This award was presented by his longtime friend and industry luminary Mark DeLoura, who is currently serving as the Senior Adviser for Digital Media at the White House Office of Science and Technology Policy.

== Past Pixels ==
PastPixels logo

In 2009, Chris Melissinos founded the PastPixels organization to start and focus on the long term preservation of video games and related ephemera. Stemming from his lifelong collecting, since the early 1970s, and building upon his work in the video games industry for more than 15 years, PastPixels was created as an entity for him to pursue preservation projects. The first of these projects to be completed was "The Art of Video Games" for the Smithsonian American Art Museum in Washington, DC.
