= Trick Shot (video game) =

1982 video game

- Developer: Imagic
- Publisher: Imagic
- Designer: Dennis Koble
- Platform: Atari 2600
- Release: NA: April 1982; PAL: September 1982
- Genre: Sports (cue sports)
- Modes: Single-player, multiplayer

Trick Shot is a pocket billiards video game released for the Atari 2600 by Imagic in 1982. It was designed by former Atari programmer and Imagic vice president, Dennis Koble. It was the first game Koble developed with Imagic, and one of the company's three debut games, along with Demon Attack and Star Voyager. Players can choose between several paired down varieties of pool, each with only three target balls. There is also a trick shot mode that provides nine challenge rounds. Koble attempted to simulate realistic ball physics but failed due to the technical limitations of the Atari 2600. Critics consider it to be a well made game but not quite as appealing as other Imagic titles.

== Gameplay ==
Trick Shot is a simulation of pocket billiards using four balls, three target balls and a cue ball. Players can choose to play a version of pool, English billiards, or complete a "trick shot" mode with nine predetermined puzzles, each requiring the player to sink at least one target ball in one shot. On each shot, players can choose the cue balls angle, power, and spin (which the manual refers to as "english"). The cue can take one of 16 different angles with options for topspin, backspin, and left or right spin.

== Development and release ==
Trick Shot was written by Dennis Koble, a former programmer and supervisor at Atari and one of Imagic's founders. At Imagic, he held the title of vice president of software development. According to Koble, who had studied physics in college, it was difficult to implement the ball physics on the Atari 2600. He ultimately had to settle for an approximation. According to Electronic Games, the limited video RAM available to the Atari 2600 might have been a reason for the limited number of billiard balls.

Trick Shot was one of three titles initially released by Imagic, along with Rob Fulop's Demon Attack and Bob Smith's Star Voyager. All three games released in April 1982 in the United States. In the United Kingdom, it released in September 1982 and was distributed by Adam Imports. It was also released in other European countries.

The cue represented as a white dot aiming the cue ball at a target ball

== Reception ==
Bill Kunkel and Arnie Katz of Electronic Games called Trick Shot "a leisurely paced videogame that should prove a captivating change of pace for both male and female home arcaders." In Arcade Alley, Kunkel and Katz wrote it was "a 7½ out of 10 compared to, say Demon Attack's 9½" but still recommended it as a must own cartridge. Phil Wiswell in Games thought the pool and English billiards modes were fun with two players but weren't very realistic given the limited number of balls. JoyStik gave it a seven out of ten for graphics and an eight out of ten for gameplay. British magazine Computer and Video Games called the ball movement "convincing" but thought the large pockets made it too easy to sink balls unintentionally. TV Gamer complimented the graphics but thought the sound "left something to be desired." German magazine TeleMatch thought it required great skill to achieve a high score.
