= Firestorm: Thunderhawk 2 =

1995 video game

- Developer: Core Design
- Publishers: Core Design; Victor Entertainment (Japan)
- Designer: Roberto Cirillo
- Programmer: Sarah Avory
- Artist: Roberto Cirillo
- Composer: Martin Iveson
- Platforms: PlayStation, Sega Saturn, MS-DOS
- Release: Sega Saturn: EU: 4 December 1995; NA: December 1995; JP: 23 February 1996; PlayStation: EU: 4 December 1995; NA: 15 January 1996; JP: 24 May 1996; MS-DOS: EU: 4 December 1995
- Genre: Combat flight simulation
- Mode: Single-player

Firestorm: Thunderhawk 2, known as Thunderstrike 2 in North America, is a 1995 combat flight simulation video game developed and published by Core Design for PlayStation, Sega Saturn and MS-DOS. It is the sequel to Thunderhawk AH-73M.

== Gameplay ==
A gameplay screenshot, with the AH-73M helicopter firing missiles at a warship.

Firestorm: Thunderhawk 2 is a combat flight simulator in which the player pilots a fictional attack helicopter, the AH-73M, through a series of missions around the world. The game consists of eight campaigns, taking place in locations such as the Panama Canal, South America, and the South China Sea. While the player can choose a campaign in any order, missions must be completed chronologically. The AH-73M is controlled by turning, altering altitudes, and accelerating or decelerating the helicopter. The player can choose to view the action from various viewpoints, including views from outside the helicopter or from within a cockpit. The AH-73M is armed with a variety of weapons, which includes a chain gun, missiles, rockets, and cluster bombs. Most of the weapons, except for a chain gun, uses a limited supply of ammunition. It is possible for the player to heavily customise the weaponry on their AH-73M before the beginning of each mission.

The heads-up display shows an armour level, a mini-map, a compass, a radar for displaying targets, and the currently selected weapon. The HUD also shows a radar detection warning display, which warns the player when the enemy is tracking their flight path and has locked on to them. When the player either completes or fails the mission, the result indicator is displayed and they are free to leave the mission zone. After completing a mission, the debrief screen appears, showing the percentage of kills and points awarded. The player is awarded with a medal for successfully completing a mission, and a ribbon for completing the entire campaign. A demerit is also awarded for failing to complete the mission objective, or leaving the mission zone without destroying all the primary targets; the player is grounded if three demerits are awarded in any one campaign.

== Development ==
Firestorm: Thunderhawk 2 was created by the British studio Core Design, as a sequel to the original Thunderhawk. Sarah Avory served as a lead programmer, while Martin Iveson handled the game's music and sound effects. The game was developed simultaneously for the PC, Saturn, and PlayStation, with the PC as the lead platform. According to Avory, the game took very little time to develop since it reused the game engine from Thunderhawk; it took only one month to create a playable version for the PC, and just a few days to port this early version over to both the PlayStation and Saturn. With this accomplished, the team set about adding additional missions, troops, and bug fixes, working towards a release date of 4 December 1995 for all three versions. In Japan, the Sega Saturn version of Thunderhawk 2 was released by Victor Entertainment on 23 February 1996, followed by the PlayStation version on 24 May. An Atari Jaguar CD port was planned but never released.

== Reception ==
Reception

Review scores
Publication	Score
Electronic Gaming Monthly	8.5/10, 8/10, 7.5/10, 8/10 (SAT)
Hyper	83/100 (SAT)
Next Generation	4/5 (SAT, PS1)
Play	85% (PS1)
Maximum	4/5 (SAT, PS1)
Sega Saturn Magazine	90% (SAT)

The PlayStation and Sega Saturn versions received mostly positive reviews. Common subjects of praise included the fun of destroying enemies and scenery, the large number of missions, and the use of contemporary real world scenarios and weaponry. Critics generally complimented the heavily detailed and realistic graphics, but reprimanded the draw distance problems, particularly the considerable pop-up. However, even the game's sternest critics concluded it to be far better than contemporary flight simulators, such as Wing Arms and Black Fire. In 1996, GamesMaster ranked the game 9th on their "The GamesMaster Saturn Top 10".

== Sequel ==
Firestorm: Thunderhawk 2 was followed by its sequel Thunderhawk: Operation Phoenix.
