= Crime and Punishment (video game) =

1984 video game

- Developer: Imagic
- Publishers: Imagic; Mindscape (MS-DOS)
- Platforms: Apple II, Commodore 64, MS-DOS
- Release: NA: 1984; EU: 1984
- Mode: Single-player

Crime and Punishment is a legal simulation video game developed by Imagic and published for the Apple II and Commodore 64 in 1984. Mindscape released a port for IBM PC compatibles the same year.

== Gameplay ==
The player assumed the role of a sentencing judge in a criminal law matter before the courts.

Information available to the player included details on the nature of the crime committed, the defendants prior criminal history and pre-sentencing reports.

The player could also review known facts relating to the case before sentencing the prisoner to probation, jail, prison or even choose the death penalty in murder cases.

In the case of imprisonment, the player also chose the length of prison term.

Scoring was related to how closely the sentence handed out by the player matched that of what a real life judge decided in the case; the player was penalized for asking irrelevant questions.

On pirated editions, the game had only one kind of case, software piracy, and the only available sentence was death.

== Reception ==
A review in Family Computing found that, despite some lack of documentation, the game was "a worthwhile program, and one that makes good use of the computer." Electronic Games found it "a marvelous piece of software that will not only educate and enlighten its users" and would" prove more entertaining than 'The People's Court'".
