= Riddle of the Sphinx (video game) =

1982 video game

- Developer: Imagic
- Publisher: Imagic
- Designer: Bob Smith
- Platform: Atari 2600
- Release: August 1982
- Genre: Action-adventure
- Mode: Single-player

Riddle of the Sphinx is a 1982 vertically-scrolling action-adventure game written by Bob Smith for the Atari 2600 and published by Imagic. As the Prince of Egypt, the player must collect treasures and gain strength to rescue the land from a terrible curse. It was Smith's second game after leaving Atari for Imagic, following Star Voyager. Smith wanted to branch out from shoot 'em up games and was inspired by the Rosicrucian Egyptian Museum in San Jose, California.

Players collect an inventory of items and manage stats including health and thirst. The second player controller and difficulty and graphical switches are used to interface with these features. Players must provide the correct offerings to landmarks found throughout the map, such as pyramids and sphinxes. Riddles included in the manual provide hints to the correct item for each location.

After the game was released, a contest was held for whoever could provide the most creative solution to the game's riddles. The winner, who presented the answer on a 12-foot scroll inscribed with Egyptian hieroglyphs, received the prize from Smith at the Rosicrucian museum.

Critics enjoyed the game's complexity and focus on puzzle-solving over action.

== Gameplay ==
Riddle of the Sphinx is an action-adventure game played from a top-down vertically scrolling perspective. Players take the role of an Ancient Egyptian prince who appeases the Egyptian gods through offerings collected throughout the explorable map. Anubis has put a curse on the land causing it to be filled with scorpions and thieves, which the player can fend off using a rock sling. The prince can also get thirsty which causes him to move slower and shoot rocks less far. The player has an inventory of items that can be selected between and used with the second player controller. There are also a variety of stats including inner strength, time elapsed, thirst, and wound that can be displayed using combinations of the Atari 2600's black and white/color switch and right difficulty switch.

A screenshot from Riddle of the Sphinx

The game world contains nomad traders who buy and sell items, temples of Anubis and Isis which can either help or harm the player, oases that refill the player's thirst, landmarks including a sphinx, a phoenix, a pyramid, and the Temple of Ra. On higher difficulty settings, landmarks will only grant passage when specific items are offered. Riddles in the manual provide hints to the items required for each landmark. Solving a final riddle allows a final offering to be made at the Temple of Ra and for the game to end.

== Development ==
Riddle of the Sphinx was created by Bob Smith for Imagic. Smith was a former developer at Atari who created Video Pinball. He left to form Imagic in 1981 along with colleagues Rob Fulop and Dennis Koble. Before leaving, Smith had been working on an unreleased Dungeons & Dragons game for the Atari 2600. Riddle of the Sphinx was Smith's second game for Imagic after Star Voyager.

According to Smith, the theme was inspired by the Rosicrucian Egyptian Museum, which was three blocks away from Smith's childhood home in San Jose, CA. In Atari 2600 programming, the core program that handles sending graphics to the console's graphics chip, known as the Television Interface Adapter, is called the kernel. Smith had written a kernel that allowed enemies to travel downwards and projectiles to travel in the opposite direction upwards. In an interview with Atari Archive, Smith said "I wanted to do something different...I thought 'I've got this idea for the kernals. I've got the idea for the game and so this is what I'm going to do.'" In an interview with Retro Gamer, Smith said "I didn't want to do another shooter so this is something more cerebral."

== Release ==
In the United States, Riddle of the Sphinx released alongside Fire Fighter in August 1982. In the United Kingdom, it was available before Christmas that same year. Smith estimates the game sold about 750,000 copies. A contest in the US that asked contestants to submit "the most creative and intriguing answer" to the game's riddle. The winner, a 30-year-old Egyptology enthusiast from Santa Monica, presented his answer on a 12-foot scroll inscribed with Egyptian hieroglyphs. The winner received $1,000 presented by Bob Smith at the Rosicrucian Egyptian Museum. A similar contest was held in the UK for £185 worth of Imagic products, including six game cartridges.

== Reception ==
In "A Players Guide to Fantasy Games", Electronic Games said the puzzles were "challenging" and "intriguing enough to keep most people from exhausting its possibilities in a hurry" but that Riddle of the Sphinx lacked replay value and that "it's a lot of fun until a point is reached." In its 1983 Arcade Awards the game received a certificate of merit for "Best Adventure Videogame" losing the top spot to Pitfall. The Electronic Games 1984 Software Encyclopedia gave it an 8 out of 10 but said that "those who hate to read the instructions before slapping the cartridge in...might have a bad time."

Mike Wilson of The Logical Gamer said "the only way it could have been better would be if the VCS had more memory than it does." Bechtold's co-reviewer Alan R. Bechtold said it was at that point "as involved, complex, and engrossing as anything available on any system." Richard A. Edwards reviewed Riddle of the Sphinx in The Space Gamer, and called it a "masterful" blend of strategy and arcade gaming in a home cartridge. JoyStik called it "one of the most elaborate quest/adventure games ever created" in 1983. British magazine TV Gamer considered it "a very complex game indeed" and a "first rate adventure game." The Video Game Update recommended it for lovers of "mysterious adventures and quests." Phil Wilson in the magazine Video Games called it "one of his favorite games" adding "fast, accurate shooting will not win this game for you, thinking will." Rick Johnson in Vidiot complained about the overall complexity and obtuseness of the riddles.

== See also ==
- List of Atari 2600 games
