= Injured Engine =

1984 video game

- Developers: Dave Johnson; Karen Elliott; Chip Curry
- Publisher: Imagic
- Designer: Dave Johnson
- Platforms: Commodore 64, Apple II
- Release: 1984
- Genres: Puzzle, simulation
- Modes: Single-player, multiplayer

Injured Engine is a game released for the Apple II and Commodore 64 by Imagic. The player must diagnose problems in a simulated automobile engine. The game aims to teach how engines work and how engine parts relate to each other. It was created by an auto mechanic and a graphic artist. Imagic demonstrated it at the 1984 Consumer Electronics Show.

== Gameplay ==
Apple II screenshot

== Reception ==
Rhea J. Grundy of Home Computer Magazine compared it to a Revell V-8 engine model and said the game teaches an "increased awareness of your automobile" rather than the skill necessary to make repairs. Mark Cotone of Commodore Microcomputers wrote that Injured Engine will not replace mechanics or detailed manuals, but it can aid in learning proper maintenance. Joyce Worley of Electronic Games called it an easy game that can help novices to talk more knowledgeably to mechanics. Kiplinger's Personal Finance called it an easy way to learn the basics of car engines.
