= Jim Waldo =

American computer scientist

- Education: University of Utah; University of Massachusetts Amherst
- Known for: Jini, Project Darkstar
- Awards: Distinguished Engineer, Sun Microsystems
- Scientific career
- Fields: Distributed computing Privacy
- Workplaces: Hampshire College; VI Corp; Pixel Computer; Apollo Computer; Sun Microsystems; VMware; Harvard University
- Thesis: Truth-value gaps in natural language (1980)
- Doctoral advisor: Terence Parsons

Jim Waldo is an American computer scientist and the Chief Technology Officer of Harvard University. He is the Gordon McKay Professor of the Practice of Computer Science at the Harvard School of Engineering and Applied Sciences and Professor of Technology and Policy at the Harvard Kennedy School. Previously he was a Distinguished Engineer at Sun Microsystems Laboratories, where he was lead architect for Jini, a distributed programming system based on Java, and helped develop Project Darkstar. He was also involved in some of the early design and development of the Java programming language and environment.

== Biography ==
Jim Waldo graduated from the University of Utah in 1973 with a BS in philosophy, in 1975 with an MA in linguistics, and in 1976 with an MA in philosophy. He then attended the University of Massachusetts at Amherst for his PhD in philosophy and graduated in 1980. After a year-long academic position at Hampshire College, he joined a startup company as a programmer. He moved to Apollo Computer in 1985 and stayed on when it was acquired by Hewlett-Packard in 1989. While at HP, he led the design and development of the first object request broker and was instrumental in getting that technology incorporated into the first CORBA specification. He then moved to Sun Microsystems in 1992. He left Sun in 2010 and after a year at VMWare, he joined Harvard University where he was named CTO in 2011.

== Bibliography ==
- Waldo, Jim (2010). Java: The Good Parts. O'Reilly Media. ISBN 978-0596803735.
- Waldo, James; Lin, Herbert S.; Millett, Lynette I. (2007). Engaging Privacy and Information Technology in a Digital Age. Washington, D.C.: National Academies Press. p. 450. ISBN 978-0309103923.
- Arnold, Ken; O'Sullivan, Bryan; Scheifler, Robert W.; Waldo, Jim; Wollrath, Ann (1999). The Jini Specification. Reading, Mass.: Addison-Wesley Professional. pp. 400. ISBN 978-0201616347.
- Waldo, Jim (1993). The Evolution of C++: Language Design in the Marketplace of Ideas. Cambridge, Mass.: MIT Press. pp. 291. ISBN 9780262731072.
