= Imagic =

American video game company

- Type: Private
- Industry: Video games
- Founded: 1981
- Defunct: 1986
- Fate: Liquidation
- Headquarters: Los Gatos, California, United States
- Key people: Bill Grubb; Dennis Koble; Jim Goldberger; Brian Dougherty; Bob Smith; Rob Fulop; Dave Durran; Pat Ransil; Gary Kato

Imagic (/ɪˈmædʒɪk/ i-MA-jik) was an American video game developer and publisher that created games initially for the Atari 2600. Founded in 1981 by corporate alumni of Atari, Inc. and Mattel, its best-selling titles were Atlantis, Cosmic Ark, and Demon Attack. Imagic also released games for Intellivision, ColecoVision, Atari 8-bit computers, TI-99/4A, IBM PCjr, VIC-20, Commodore 64, TRS-80 Color Computer, and Magnavox Odyssey². Their Odyssey² ports of Demon Attack and Atlantis were the only third-party releases for that system in America. The company never recovered from the video game crash of 1983 and was liquidated in 1986.

== History ==
Imagic was the second independent video game publisher in the early days of home programmable video game systems following Activision. Prior to Activision only Atari and Mattel offered games for their respective consoles. In early 1981, Bill Grubb, the founding CEO of Imagic, had recently left his position as the VP of Sales and Marketing at Atari. After witnessing Activision's meteoric success, Grubb began making plans to form another independent Atari game developer and teamed up with Dennis Koble who was managing game development at Atari. By coincidence at the same time, Jim Goldberger, a marketing executive at Mattel, was working on a business plan with Brian Dougherty, a senior engineer at Mattel, to form the first independent game company for the Mattel Intellivision, the second largest game console at the time. Grubb and Goldberger knew each other and on April 1, 1981 had a meeting in which they discussed each others plans. Grubb suggested joining forces which would allow the new company to distinguish itself from Activision by offering games for both platforms. An agreement was reached and Grubb and Dougherty pitched venture capitalist Kleiner Perkins and Merrill Pickard, ultimately raising $2 million in seed capital. The company was organized as a California Corporation on June 1, 1981, with Frank Caufield and Steve Merrill joining the board along with Grubb and Dougherty. Other founders included Bob Smith and Rob Fulop from Atari, Inc., Dave Durran from Mattel as well as Pat Ransil and Gary Kato.

It was Grubb's goal to take Imagic public and to eventually overtake Activision as the number one third-party video game publisher. Like Activision, Imagic had a meteoric rise, in its first 3 quarters of sales in 1982, the company sold $48 million worth of games led by Demon Attack developed by Rob Fulop, which became one of the top selling games in the industry. An Intellivision version was also developed by Gary Kato. Fulop, was previously a programmer at Atari, and claimed in a 2019 interview with Paleotronic Magazine that he left the company in favor of Imagic after being paid for developing the Atari 2600 port of Missile Command with a Safeway coupon for a free turkey rather than the monetary Christmas bonus he had expected. Atari later sued Imagic over the Intellivision version of Demon Attack claiming it was to similar to Phoenix, which Atari had the exclusive home console rights to. The case was later settled out of court.

Imagic filed for an initial public offering (IPO) in November 1982 with underwriters Merrill Lynch, Hambrecht & Quist, and Alex Brown. Grubb and Dougherty, along with CFO Dennis Rowland completed a public offering road show. The offering was well received and the company was set to go public on December 10, 1982. On December 8th, Warner Communications announced that sales at Atari were significantly down for the 1982 Christmas season. This news negatively affected demand for Imagic's stock forcing the offering to be delayed indefinetly.

Imagic was heavily affected by the video game crash of 1983. Following outcry from retailers following the 1982 Christmas season, Imagic implemented a buyback program. Imagic agreed to buy millions of games back from retailers to provide shelf space for new titles. In order to raise money for storage fees on these old games, Imagic reportedly sold $12 million of its own company stock. In early September 1983, the company laid off 40 out of 170 employees. By October, Imagic had laid off most of its workforce and announced that they would exclusively become a "game design house" and discontinue production of their own games.. By November, Bill Grubb had been replaced by Bruce Davis as CEO. Davis had represented the company as legal counsel during the failed IPO launch. After losing confidence in Grubb, the board was drawn to Davis thanks to his accounting background and his previous prediction of the industry crash.

Imagic appeared at the 1984 Consumer Electronics Show with plans for four IBM PCjr games. Imagic was eventually liquidated in 1986. The rights to Imagic's most popular titles have been owned by Activision since the late 1980s, and they have been re-released on several occasions.

== Fan club ==
During its height, Imagic ran a fan club for their games, the Numb Thumb Club, which published an annual newsletter. Only two issues were published before Imagic's decline began in late 1983.

== Games ==
Imagic 2600 cartridges were distinct from both Activision and Atari cartridges with an extended ridge at the top of the cart. Packaging was distinctive due to the use of reflective silver on the boxes, with a tapered, ridged end intended for an easy grip. The years are for the original versions only, not subsequent ports.

=== Developed and published ===
Title	Designer (Note: As printed on each game's packaging)	Released	Platform
Demon Attack	Rob Fulop	April 1982	Atari 2600, Intellivision, Atari 8-bit (1983), Odyssey 2 (1983), Vic-20 (1983), TI-99/4A (1983), IBM PC (1984), TRS-80 CoCo (1984), Commodore 64 (1984)
Star Voyager	Bob Smith	April 1982	Atari 2600
Trick Shot	Dennis Koble	April 1982	Atari 2600
Atlantis	Dennis Koble	July 1982	Atari 2600, Intellivision, Vic-20 (1983), Atari 8-bit (1983), Odysssey 2 (1983)
Cosmic Ark	Rob Fulop	July 1982	Atari 2600
Fire Fighter	Brad Stewart	August 1982	Atari 2600
Riddle of the Sphinx	Bob Smith	August 1982	Atari 2600
Beauty & the Beast	Wendell Brown	October 1982	Intellivision
Microsurgeon	Rick Levine	October 1982	Intellivision, IBM PC (1984), TI-99/4A (1984)
Dragonfire	Bob Smith	December 1982	Atari 2600, Intellivision, Vic-20 (1983), ZX Spectrum (1984), TRS-80 CoCo (1984) Colecovision (1984), Commodore 64 (1984), Apple II (1984)
Swords & Serpents	Brian P. Dougherty	February 1983	Intellivision
Dracula	Alan Smith	March 1983	Intellivision
Ice Trek	Patrick Schmitz	March 1983	Intellivision
No Escape!	Michael Greene	April 1983	Atari 2600
Nova Blast	Clinton Ballard	April 1983	Intellivision, Colecovision, Commodore 64 (1984)
Shootin' Gallery	Dennis Koble	April 1983	Atari 2600
Truckin'	Rick Levine	April 1983	Intellivision
Tropical Trouble	Steve DeFrisco	May 1983	Intellivision
White Water!	Douglas A. Fults	May 1983	Intellivision
Solar Storm	Dennis Koble	June 1983	Atari 2600
Moonsweeper	Bob Smith	July 1983	Atari 2600, Colecovision, ZX Spectrum, Commodore 64, MSX, TI-99/4A
Safecracker	Marvin Mednick	July 1983	Intellivision
Fathom	Rob Fulop	August 1983	Atari 2600, Intellivision, Colecovision (1984), TI99/4A (1984), MSX (1985)
Quick Step	David Johnson	October 1983	Atari 2600
Subterranea	Mark Klien	December 1983	Atari 2600
Wing War	Michael Greene	March 1984	Colecovision, Atari 2600 (Note: Only released in PAL regions) (1984), TI-99/4A (1984)
Imagic 1-2-3 (Note: A compilation of Laser Gates, Quick Step, and Wing War)		June 1984	Atari 8-bit
Crime and Punishment	Jack Kress, Graeme Newman, Rick Oliver	September 1984	IBM PCjr, Apple II, Commodore 64
Injured Engine	Dave Johnson	November 1984	Commodore 64, Apple II
Chopper Hunt (Note: formerly Buried Bucks from ANALOG Software)	Tom Hudson	December 1984	Atari 8-bit, Commodore 64
Grand Slam Baseball		December 1984	IBM PCjr

=== Only published ===
Title	Designer	Developer	Released	Platform
Laser Gates	Dan Oliver	VentureVision	October 1983	Atari 2600
Tournament Tennis	Steve Kelly	D&L Research	December 1984	Colecovision, Commodore 64, ZX Spectrum, MS-DOS (1985), Atari ST (1985), Amstrad CPC (1985), Sinclair QL (1985), Thompson TO (1985)

=== Only developed ===
Title	Publisher	Released	Platform
Touchdown Football	IBM, EA, Atari Corp.	August 1984	IBM PCjr, Atari 8-bit, Commodore 64, Atari 7800
Sherlock Holmes in "Another Bow"	Bantam Books	August 1985	Apple II, Commodore 64, Macintosh, IBM PCjr
I, Damiano: The Wizard of Partestrada	Bantam Books	September 1985	Apple II, IBM PCjr
