= Black Fire (video game) =

1995 video game

- Developer: NovaLogic (Note: Additional work by Sega Away Team.)
- Publishers: NA: Sega; JP/EU: Virgin Interactive Entertainment
- Platform: Sega Saturn
- Release: NA: November 10, 1995; JP: December 22, 1995; EU: June 28, 1996
- Genre: Combat flight simulator
- Mode: Single-player

Black Fire is a 1995 combat flight simulation video game developed by NovaLogic, published in North America by Sega and in Japan and Europe by Virgin Interactive Entertainment for the Sega Saturn.

== Gameplay ==
Black Fire is a helicopter combat flight simulation game. The player controls a helicopter from a first-person perspective, having to deal with being attacked by enemies, including helicopters and other vehicles. This perspective can be changed to a side view. The player can choose between four different types of weapons during play. Damage is caused by either being shot, being crashed into by other helicopters, and crashing into terrain. Different parts of the helicopter can become damaged, indicated by the color of the helicopter changing on the in-game user interface. Damaged parts may cause the helicopter to operate differently. The helicopter the player controls has both limited ammo and fuel; if the fuel runs out, the level is lost. The level is also lost if the player runs out of time.

== Development and release ==
Black Fire was developed by NovaLogic for the Sega Saturn. It was published by Sega in North America on November 10, 1995. It was later published by Virgin Interactive Entertainment in Japan on December 22, 1995 and in Europe on June 28, 1996.

== Reception ==
Reception

Review scores
Publication	Score
Game Players	71%
GameFan	204/300
GameRevolution	6/10
Mean Machines Sega	70/100
Next Generation	3/5
Fusion	2/5
Sega Power	74%
Sega Pro	80/100
Sega Saturn Magazine	75%
Total Saturn	67%
Ultimate Gamer	6/10

Black Fire garnered divisive reception from critics. Fusion's Mike Nallas saw the game's polygonal landscapes as its best point, but pointed out issues with the radar and targeting systems. GameFan's three reviewers regarded it to be a fair combat flight simulator but thought the visuals were unimpressive. They also noted its learning curve due to the controls, "annoying" draw distance, and lack of additional camera angles, among other flaws. Game Players' Patrick Baggatta commended the texture-mapped 360° playfields, in-game radio hints, soundtrack, and fast-paced gameplay. Nevertheless, Baggatta saw the repetitive terrain, lack of strategy, and "awkward" controls to be the game's negative points.

Next Generation agreed with Baggatta, stating that "The obvious attempt to be all things to all gamers makes it too easy to overlook the impressive elements of Blackfire, such as the occasionally stunning graphics and intense action sequences, but with time these rewarding facets do manage to make their way to the surface. Perhaps if there was more of a strategic approach to the action as opposed to the shoot-'em-up angle, then these elements would be more obvious. As is, Blackfire has its moments, but it lacks a consistent hook." Ultimate Gamer's Frank O'Connor found it graphically dull but fun gameplay-wise. Sega Pro's Mat Yeo gave positive remarks to its minimal loading times and graphical presentation, but stated that "tighter controls would have been welcome".

GamePro expressed that the pre-rendered cutscenes between stages outclassed its "jagged" in-game visuals, while also noting the helicopter's limited altitude. Sega Power' Dave Perrett and James Ashton felt mixed regarding the game's visuals and originality, but praise was given to its audio and replay value. Sega Saturn Magazine's Rad Automatic wrote that "Basically, Blackfire is a good game engine saddled with a disappointing level premise. The mission objectives increase in their complexity, but the action required to complete each one doesn't. It's enjoyable enough for a while, but don't expect a classic — or even more than a week's enjoyment."

Mean Machines Sega's Marcus Hearn and Paul Gascoigne favorably compared the game with both Magic Carpet (1994) and Hi-Octane (1995) graphics-wise. Regardless, Hearn and Gascoigne concurred with other reviewers regarding its field of vision, controls, and difficult levels. They ultimately recommended Firestorm: Thunderhawk 2. Total Saturn saw its visuals, sound, and gameplay to be average. GameRevolution lauded the overall visual presentation and audio design, but noted its difficult learning curve.
