= Quick Step (video game) =

1983 video game

- Developer: Imagic
- Publisher: Imagic
- Designer: David Johnson
- Platform: Atari 2600
- Release: September 1983
- Genre: Action
- Modes: Single-player, multiplayer

Quick Step is an Atari 2600 action game written by David Johnson. It was published by Imagic in September 1983 as one of the last Atari 2600 games from the company. The player controls a kangaroo competing against a squirrel, where both animals must jump between moving platforms, changing them to their character's color to earn points. There is a two-player mode where the second player controls the squirrel.

== Gameplay ==
Quick Step on Atari 2600

The gameplay of Quick Step consists of controlling a green kangaroo that must jump across different colored vertically scrolling platforms, competing against a purple squirrel. Jumping onto a platform changes it to the character's color and the player gets a point for every platform of their color that scrolls off the screen. Certain platforms (called "magic mats") will freeze the other character in place when jumped on, which can cause the other player to lose a life if they are near the bottom of the screen and the platform they are on scrolls off. The player can also press the fire button to release a "tricky trap" which causes the platform under the other character to disappear, causing them to fall. The platforms speed up as gameplay progresses, and eventually collapse into a single column towards the end of the level.

The game may be played in single-player mode, or in a two-player mode where the second player can control the squirrel.

== Development ==
Quick Step was designed by David Johnson, with graphics assistance from Wilfredo Aguilar, Michael Becker, and Wendy Szeto.

== Reception ==
A review in the December 1983 issue of Video and Computer Gaming Illustrated was mixed, being critical of the graphics and having a mixed reaction to the gameplay. Video Games Magazine was also critical of the graphics, but praised the game as "a truly different game, if only because of the potpourri of elements". Computer Entertainer praised the two-player mode, calling it a "gem". The Fort Worth Star-Telegram called Quick Step "closer to a miss than a hit". Many reviewers considered it a clone of Q*bert.

In a retrospective review of Imagic games, IGN said Quick Step "is a brilliant, furious multiplayer game for a system not exactly known for aggressive two-player action games", putting it in their top five list of Imagic games for the Atari 2600. videogamecritic.com said that while Quick Step was inspired by Q*bert, it lacks the "charm" that made Q*bert a video game classic.
