= No Escape! =

1983 Atari action game

- Developer: Imagic
- Publisher: Imagic
- Designer: Michael Greene
- Platform: Atari 2600
- Release: April 1983
- Genre: Action
- Modes: Single-player, multiplayer

No Escape! is an Atari 2600 video game developed and published by Imagic in 1983. The player controls Jason, leader of the Argonauts, who fights off the Furies sent by the Greek gods. A two-player mode, in which the second player competes against the first turn-by-turn, is also available.

== Gameplay ==
No Escape! on the Atari 2600

No Escape! begins with Jason imprisoned in the temple of Aphrodite due to stealing the Golden Fleece. Jason must survive against waves of attacking Furies, and the gameplay revolves around picking up and throwing rocks. The player must hit the ceiling of the temple, causing a brick to fall onto a Fury. Throwing a rock directly at a Fury causes two more Furies to appear in its place. Gameplay is focused around timing the falling brick to intersect with the moving Furies. Subsequent levels increase the difficulty by allowing the Furies to shoot back at the player, fly around faster, and move in different patterns.

The game may be played in single-player mode, or in two-player mode where each player takes turns.

== Development and release ==
No Escape! was programmed by Michael Greene with graphical assistance by Michael Becker and Wilfredo Aguilar. This was Greene's first project at publisher Imagic, having also worked for the company on the game Wing War for Atari 2600 and the program Talking Teacher for Commodore 64. Greene estimated that it took six months to develop No Escape! and said the game's Greek mythology theme was a different one than what he had initially chosen. Becker and Aguilar collaborated on Imagic's Fathom, a game based on Roman mythology, just before the company's dissolution.

Imagic released No Escape! in April 1983.

== Reception ==
Hardcore Gaming 101 called the game a "rare gem" and said it has a "completely different feel to any other shooter from that time, or, for that matter, any other shooter since". IGN called it a "strange shooter", but also complimented its "compelling gameplay and some very attractive visuals". The game was also praised for its final animation showing Jason escaping on Pegasus.

In a 1983 review from Electronic Fun with Computers & Games, Imagic was praised for delivering a game with the right balance, providing a "challenge that the player can neither overcome nor resist playing again and again."
