= Wing Arms =

1995 video game

- European cover art
- Developer: Bell Corporation
- Publisher: Sega
- Director: Kouji Iwashita
- Designer: Joe Gillian
- Platform: Sega Saturn
- Release: JP: September 29, 1995; NA: January 1996; EU: February 1996
- Genre: Flight simulator
- Mode: Single player

Wing Arms is a 1995 mission based flight simulator video game for the Sega Saturn taking place some time after World War II in an alternate chain of events. Players choose one of seven different Allied and Axis fighter planes and are assigned to six seek and destroy missions against a large, equally unified squadron and naval force. It is an arcade style flight simulator, as the physics are simplified for the sake of playability; the planes do not stall when traveling under stalling speeds and planes do not crash against water and other surfaces when descending from high altitudes. It was one of the first games to be developed using the Sega Graphics Library operating system.

== Story ==
Some time after the summer of 1945, a group of arms manufacturers throughout the Axis and Allied countries known as Avalon revealed to have played a large part in instigating combat in World War II which resulted in the boom of vehicle and weapons production. As soon as the war ended however, Avalon's riches started to decrease, resulting in their decision to keep the war going by using captured Axis and Allied planes against opposite nations military facilities.

A squadron of unified Allied and Axis planes are assembled aboard the USS Enterprise to deal with the newest products of Avalon and to crush the company for good.

== Planes ==
These are the available planes the player can choose from aboard the Enterprise, each have different speeds, shield strength (which serves as the plane's armor) and are all equipped with up to 30 rockets.

- Mitsubishi A6M Zero
- Grumman F6F Hellcat
- Kyūshū J7W Shinden
- P-51 Mustang
- Supermarine Spitfire Mk.I
- P-38 Lightning
- Messerschmitt Me 262 Schwalbe

== Gameplay ==
Players start immediately by choosing the plane they wish to pilot. From there, their missions start with a quick briefing from the aircraft carrier's admiral via radio. Players must accomplish a particular goal in order to progress, particularly destroying a certain number of plane targets or destroying a particular base, ship or fortification.

After every mission, players are ranked by the types of targets they destroyed (Land, Air and Sea), their total number of targets destroyed, the time it took them to clear the mission and their current rank. Players can work their way up in ranks with 2nd Lieutenant being the lowest and Colonel being the highest. Players are also given three credits they can use once their plane is destroyed.

== Reception ==
Reception

Review scores
Publication	Score
Electronic Gaming Monthly	7.25/10
Next Generation	3/5
Maximum	2/5
Sega Saturn Magazine	82%

The four reviewers of Electronic Gaming Monthly each expressed different opinions of what Wing Arms's strong points and drawbacks are, but all but one agreed that it was an overall excellent flight simulator. Rad Automatic of Sega Saturn Magazine praised the variety of missions and the sophisticated control system, though he felt that the enemy AI in the later missions is too difficult. GamePro's Slo Mo gave the game a mostly positive review for its arcade-style gameplay, tough enemy AI, and graphics, remarking that "Wing's topnotch graphics maintain a stellar performance during the fast-paced gameplay with smooth, quick animation and three aircraft views". However, he criticized the unlimited ammunition and extreme durability of the player's plane as unrealistic. Maximum remarked that Wing Arms has solid albeit unoriginal gameplay but highly uneven graphics, with extensive popup in the later levels. They concluded the game to be enjoyable but ultimately not worthwhile since it offers nothing new and is completely overshadowed by the already released Firestorm: Thunderhawk 2. A reviewer for Next Generation advised gamers that Wing Arms has a different dynamic than most arcade-style flight sims, since it uses "old-school dog-fighting" rather than locking missiles and other high-tech weaponry. He criticized the short length of the game but said it is fun while it lasts, since "the action is fast, the graphics are beautiful, and the control is a joy."
