= Star Voyager (1982 video game) =

1982 video game

- Developer: Imagic
- Publisher: Imagic
- Designer: Bob Smith
- Platform: Atari 2600
- Release: April 1982
- Genre: Space combat simulator
- Modes: Single-player, multiplayer

Star Voyager is a first-person space combat game designed by Bob Smith for the Atari 2600 and published in 1982 by Imagic. It was the first game Smith developed after leaving Atari to form Imagic, and one of the company's debut releases, along with Demon Attack and Trick Shot. Players take control of a space ship which must destroy enemy space ships and fly through seven star portals to save the day. The game was inspired by Doug Neubauer's Star Raiders which also inspired Activision's Starmaster, all three of which released for the Atari 2600 in the same year.

Like many games developed by Smith, including his first game which he sold to Creative Computing, the game takes a first-person perspective. Smith says he choose this because he wanted to make the most realistic and immersive games possible. The game was initially released in the United States in April but also released in Europe by the end of the year. It was one of the first games released by Imagic in that region.

Critics praised the gameplay and graphics, considering it exemplary of the standard of quality expected from Imagic. They also considered it to be simple compared to other variations of Star Raiders and a better choice for players who enjoy action over strategy.

== Gameplay ==
Star Voyager is a space combat simulator played from a first person perspective. It plays similarly to the combat sections from Atari's Star Raiders. Players take control of a space ship known as the Star Voyager, attempting to save the capital starport from an invasion by the planet Zakor by flying through seven star portals. On the way, players must shoot down oncoming enemy ships with one of two weapons systems: lasers or photon torpedoes. The two weapons are either chosen before the start of a new game or used simultaneously with the second player controller, providing the option for two-player cooperative play. There is also a competitive multiplayer mode which gives one player control over the enemy ships. Musical cues are used to warn of incoming enemies and star portals.

The Star Voyager flying towards an enemy near the center of the screen

== Development ==
Star Voyager was written by Bob Smith. Smith was a former Atari employee and the developer of Video Pinball. In 1981, Smith and his colleagues Rob Fulop and Dennis Koble left Atari to form Imagic. Star Voyager was the first game Smith made for Imagic. In interviews, Smith admits he was inspired by Star Raiders.

Smith had experience writing first-person games thanks to a clone of Night Driver he wrote for the TRS-80 and sold to Creative Computing. Smith also later wrote Moonsweeper, another first-person game by Imagic. Smith claims he strove to make first-person games because he wanted to make games as realistic and immersive as possible. Smith wanted to implement a version of the melody from the movie Close Encounters of the Third Kind but had trouble replicating certain notes on the Atari 2600 sound chip.

Star Voyager was first displayed alongside Demon Attack and Trick Shot at Winter CES 1982. At the show, Smith recalls being "abashed" by Alan Miller's Starmaster which Smith considered to be more technically impressive.

== Release ==
Star Voyager was one of three titles initially released by Imagic, along with Rob Fulop's Demon Attack and Dennis Koble's Trick Shot. All three games released in April 1982 in the United States. That same year, the game received competition from Activision's Starmaster and Atari's conversion of Star Raiders for the Atari 2600. In the United Kingdom, it released in fall 1982. It was distributed by Adam Imports and was the first Imagic game released in that region. It was also released in other European countries.

== Reception ==
In Electronic Games, Bill Kunkel and Arnie Katz wrote that "Imagic has quickly established its imprint as symbolic of state-of-the-art audio-visual effects. Star Voyager does nothing to tarnish this budding reputation." JoyStik called it a simplified space game with appeal to "more aggressive" players. According to Mike Wilson of The Logical Gamer, Star Voyager is "simple, yet subtly complex" and "tremendous fun". Wilson's co-reviewer Alan R. Bechtold thought the one player mode didn't provide enough gameplay compared to its competitors but still recommended the game.

British magazine TV Gamer thought it was "very nice" but not quite as good as Activision's Starmaster. German magazine TeleMatch considered it a variation of Star Raiders without any surprising twists. French magazine Tilt called it simpler than Star Raiders but still fun with impressive visuals and audio.
