= Swords & Serpents (1983 video game) =

- Developer: Imagic
- Publisher: Imagic
- Designer: Brian P. Dougherty
- Platform: Intellivision
- Release: February 1983
- Genre: Action

Swords & Serpents is a 1983 video game from Imagic for the Intellivision console.

== Gameplay ==
Swords & Serpents is presented from an overhead view and follows a Warrior Prince who navigates four levels of the Sinister Serpent's maze-like dungeon fortress, fighting Phantom Knights and Red Sorcerers along the way. The player searches the dungeon for keys and collects treasures that must be carried back to a chest located on the first level. A two‑player mode allows a second player to control Nelrem, an elderly wizard who can read scrolls to gain abilities such as fireballs, invincibility, healing, and other spells.

== Reception ==
Reception

Review scores
Publication	Score
Electronic Fun with Computers & Games	3/4
Tilt	3/6

Computer Entertainer praised the graphics and sound effects in Swords & Serpents. Creative Computing's Video & Arcade Games magazine liked Swords & Serpents but disliked the graphics.
