= Microsurgeon (video game) =

1982 video game

- Developer: Imagic
- Publisher: Imagic
- Designer: Rick Levine
- Platforms: Intellivision, TI-99/4A, IBM PCjr
- Release: Intellivision: October 1982
- Modes: Single-player, multiplayer

Microsurgeon is a video game published by Imagic in 1982 for the Mattel Intellivision game console. The game was ported to the TI-99/4A computer and the IBM PCjr. Microsurgeon was re-released as part of the Intellivision Rocks collection.

== Plot ==
A tanker carrying hazardous material has been damaged during an accident, allowing the gas inside to escape. Those exposed to the fumes begin to suffer a range of immune disorders, such as rampant bacterial infections, rapidly growing tumors, and widespread tar deposits in the lungs. Patients are being rushed to Xenon Medical Center for emergency microsurgery before their conditions become fatal; the player assumes the role of a member of the surgical staff.

== Gameplay ==
Microsurgeon is one of the first published video games related to health or health education. The player must guide a tiny medical device, the Robot Probe, throughout a patient's body to treat the ailments affecting various organs, such as bacterial infections, brain tumors, cholesterol blockages in arteries, and tapeworms.

At the start of the game, the player is presented with the patient's status chart, which shows information on each individual organ as well as an overall condition, ranging from "Good" to "Terminal". The Robot Probe is equipped with three different treatments: ultrasonic rays, antibiotics, and aspirin. The treatment to be used depends on the ailment; for example, bacteria only respond to antibiotics, while viruses can only be temporarily disabled with aspirin. If the Robot Probe moves outside of the patient's blood vessels or lymphatic system, phagocytes (roaming white blood cells) will attack it and start to drain its power. Moving the Robot Probe and dispensing treatments also use up power.

Any system whose initial status is not "Good" will slowly deteriorate toward "Terminal" until and unless it is brought up to "Good" with appropriate treatment, and cannot be improved after reaching "Terminal". The ultimate goal is to bring the patient's overall status up to "Good" and exit the patient's body through the eye, ear, nose, or mouth before the power runs out. The game ends when the power reaches zero, the player pilots the Robot Probe out of the body, or the overall status reaches "Terminal" due to two or more systems achieving this status. The player's score (represented as the total bill for the surgery) is reported only at the end of the game, and is determined by several factors such as the overall difficulty of the surgery and the patient's final status.

== Release and reception ==
Microsurgeon was released for the Intellivision in October 1982.

Danny Goodman of Creative Computing Video & Arcade Games tested Microsurgeon at the summer 1982 Consumer Electronics Show. He wrote: "From preliminary play, this cartridge looks like a 'must' for Intellivision owners for both graphics and unique game theme". It was noted as "among the most innovative computer/game software for 1982-1983" at the Consumer Electronics Show in Las Vegas. It tied for "Most Original Game" of the year in Electronic Fun with Computers & Games magazine, December 1983. The game appeared on the cover of IEEE Spectrum, December 1982, and on The Anniversary's Designing a Nervous Breakdown album cover.

Microsurgeon was among 240 video games selected to be included in "The Art of Video Games" exhibit at the Smithsonian Institution in 2012.

== Reviews ==
- Games

== Legacy ==
A remake of the game was announced in 2018 for the Intellivision Amico.
