= 1975 in video games =

1975 saw several critical influences in the history of video games, including the first commercial games utilizing large-scale integrated circuits and microprocessors, as well as the first role-playing video games.

On the back end of the Pong boom, the coin-operated video game industry achieved new expressions of gameplay and animation in arcade games. Racing games and competitive shooting games became particularly popular. Local multiplayer games accommodating more than four players were released by Atari, featuring advanced implementations of transistor-transistor logic hardware. Several games utilizing microprocessors debuted in coin-op, including the influential Gun Fight from Midway Mfg.

The console industry saw its first competitive environment in the United States with Magnavox, Atari, and smaller competitors introducing systems utilizing advanced circuit designs. Atari’s Pong home console featured a sophisticated custom chip created in-house. European dedicated consoles remained isolated to specific regions, but offered some of the first console lines from companies like Videomaster. Japan’s first native console was developed and released by toy company Epoch.

Computer networks saw a mass proliferation of game variants written in the BASIC programming language which influenced the emerging field of microcomputers. Games introduced in publications like People’s Computer Company and 101 BASIC Computer Games were frequently played via teletypes on time-sharing connected terminals; some were distributed via the remote connected ARPANET. The PLATO network likewise experienced a massive uptick in titles following the popularity of Empire and Spasim. Midwestern universities connected to the PLATO system were early recipients of the spread of Dungeons & Dragons, which prompted several student groups to develop the earliest computer role-playing games.

== Events ==
- February 16–19 – Atari attends the New York Toy Fair to interest retailers to stock their forthcoming Pong home console. They fail to find any interest among toy buyers.
- March 12 – Wallace Kirschner and Lawrence Haskel file US Patent #4,026,555 for Alpex Computer Corporation relating to a bitmapped system for video game graphics.
- March 17 – Sears, Roebuck & Co. signs an agreement with Atari Inc. to distribute their Pong home console in their Sears retail stores. Sears creates the Tele-Games brand to market the game while also allowing Atari’s logo to appear on the product. Magnavox later sues Sears over infringement of their Odyssey patents.
- September 16–19 – The first WESCON computer trade show is held in San Francisco, California. Premiering there is the MOS Technology 6502 microprocessor, which powers many future video game systems. Steve Mayer and Ron Milner of Atari's Cyan Engineering are convinced to use the 6502 in their prototype home video game system which develops into the Video Computer System.
- October 17–19 – The Music Operators of America show is held in Chicago, Illinois. Several microprocessor video games make their debut including Gun Fight from Midway, Shark from U.S. Billiards, PT-109 from Mirco Games, and Destruction Derby from Major Manufacturers.
- October 29 – Stephen Bristow of Atari Inc. patents the technology behind the first hardware-enabled sprites for video games, dubbed Player/Missile Graphics by Atari.
- November 26 – A market study evaluating the Alpex Computer home video game system using ROM cartridges is drafted by Gene Landrum for Fairchild Semiconductor, which convinces the company to create the Fairchild Video Entertainment System.

== Financial performance ==
=== United States ===
==== Arcade ====
Total unit sales: 50,000–79,000. (Note: The Frost & Sullivan estimate totals 53,000 games with traditional arcade cabinets and 26,000 for those under the new cocktail table presentation.)

Total Revenue (machine sales): $68–76 million. (Note: The Frost & Sullivan estimate totals $58 million in games with traditional arcade cabinets and $18 million for those under the new cocktail table presentation.)

Title	Arcade cabinet units (Estimates)	Manufacturer	Developer	Genre
Gun Fight	8,600	Midway Manufacturing	Dave Nutting Associates	Multi-directional shooter
Wheels	7,000 (Note: Ralph Baer's numbers compiled in April 1976 are mostly estimates without direct access to sales figures.) 2,400	Midway Manufacturing	Taito Corp	Racing
Wheels II	3,000	Midway Manufacturing	Taito Corp	Racing
PT 109	1,500	Mirco Games	Mirco Games	Action
Avenger	1,200	Electra Games	Universal Research Laboratories	Fixed shooter
Tank II	1,000	Kee Games	Atari Inc.	Multi-directional shooter
Super Flipper	538	Chicago Coin	Model Racing	Sports
Crash 'N Score	500	Atari Inc.	Atari Inc.	Racing
Jet Fighter	500	Atari Inc.	Atari Inc.	Multi-directional shooter
Shark Jaws	500	Atari Inc.	Atari Inc.	Action
Steeplechase	500	Atari Inc.	Atari Inc.	Racing

==== Most popular arcade games ====
RePlay magazine published its first popularity chart for coin-operated games in the United States in March 1976, covering games of the previous year. The lists were based on polling operators regarding their opinions of games receiving the most attention in their locations. RePlay's charts were based only on a subset of operators and are not on imperial metrics such as earnings reports, but they give a strong indication of games which were of the most value to arcades and street locations.

The RePlay rankings included both video and electro-mechanical games which ran in close competition through the 1970s until video games became dominant. Outside of the top twenty ranked in order, forty-eight other games were also listed.

Rank	Arcade video games		
Rank	Title	Genre	Manufacturer
1	Tank / Tank II	Multi-directional shooter	Kee Games
2	Wheels / Wheels II	Racing	Midway Manufacturing
3	Gun Fight	Multi-directional shooter	Midway Manufacturing
4	Indy 800	Racing	Kee Games
5	Gran Trak 10 / Gran Trak 20	Racing	Atari Inc.
6	Twin Racer	Racing	Kee Games
7	BiPlane	Multi-directional shooter	Atari Inc.
8	Racer	Racing	Midway Manufacturing
9	Demolition Derby	Racing	Chicago Coin
10	Street Burners	Racing	Allied Leisure Industries

Home consoles

Total unit sales: 250,000-400,000 consoles.

Total revenue (retail): $32–40 million.

Title	Game console units (1975)	Manufacturer	Developer
Odyssey	80,000	Magnavox	Sanders Associates/Magnavox
Odyssey 100 / Odyssey 200	100,000	Magnavox	Sanders Associates/Texas Instruments
Pong	85,000	Atari Inc.	MOS Sorcery/Atari Inc.

== Publications ==
- Ted Nelson publishes Computer Lib/Dream Machines. It discusses numerous games, including variants of Spacewar! and those on the PLATO network.
- October – RePlay magazine publishes its first issue. Edited by Eddie Adlum – previously editor for the coin machine section of publication Cash Box – the monthly magazine covers all aspects of coin-operated entertainment.

== Notable releases ==
=== Arcade games ===
- April – Indy 800 by Atari (published under the Kee Games label) begins production. The game features color graphics and an eight player cabinet powered by eight circuit boards. Despite its massive profile and price restricting the range of venues, the game is highly successful and proves the earning power of large, multiplayer games.
  - Atari releases Hi-Way, a scrolling racing game featuring a sit-down cabinet and screen-warping effects.
- September – Western Gun is released by Taito in Japan. It features the first human-on-human combat in a video game as well as destructible environments.
- October – Sega’s American marketing arm, Sega of America, releases their first video game in the United States, Bullet Mark.
  - Project Support Engineering releases Maneater. The game is noted for its special cabinet design which is molded in the shape of a great white shark with open jaws. It is one of several games capitalizing on the release of the movie Jaws – including Shark Jaws by Atari and Shark by U.S. Billiards. Steven Spielberg is photographed with the Maneater cabinet.
  - Atari introduces Steeplechase – a unique, six-player game. Controls are simplified to a single button which causes a horse to leap. It is the first graphical game featuring a character who can jump.
  - Electra Games releases Avenger. It is an early example of a scrolling shoot 'em-up.
- November – Gun Fight is released by Midway Manufacturing, based on Western Gun by Taito. It is the preeminent video game to use a microprocessor as well as the first twin-stick shooter. The game is among the most successful of 1975 and its hardware is used for subsequent Midway-released games.
- December – Exidy’s Destruction Derby is released; Chicago Coin releases it as Demolition Derby. The game is later modified to become Death Race (1976).
- Fairchild employee Jerry Lawson creates the game Destruction Derby (Note: Unrelated to the Destruction Derby released by Exidy.) which he offers to Major Manufacturers. Though the game is never officially released, its creation leads to Lawson’s engineering leadership of the Fairchild Video Entertainment System console.

=== Computer games ===
- August – The Dungeon (also known as pedit5) is developed by Reginald “Rusty” Rutherford for the PLATO IV system at the University of Illinois Champaign-Urbana. It is an early computer role-playing game, adapting Dungeons & Dragons mechanics as a graphical dungeon crawl with randomly generated encounters. The game is also the first known video game to feature a high score table.
- In response to the deletion of The Dungeon from PLATO, Paul Resch, Larry Kemp, and Eric Hagstrom of the University of Illinois Champaign-Urbana create the game Orthanc.
- Don Daglow develops the role-playing game Dungeon for the PDP-10 at Claremont University Center.

=== Hardware ===
==== Console ====
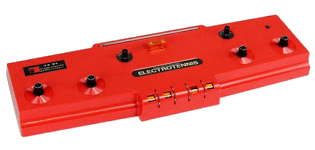
TV Tennis Electrotennis

- April – The company Jolieb distributes the Odyssey console in Japan, the first home video game to be sold in the country.
- May – Control Sales offers the Video Action II console for sale for $299. The console runs into difficulties with Federal Communications Commission restrictions, forcing the company to pull it from sale.
- September – Toy company Epoch releases TV Tennis Electrotennis in Japan. It is the first Japanese-developed home video game console, with the unusual feature of a wireless connection to the television via a UHF antenna.
- October – The Tele-Games home version of Pong (sometimes called Home Pong) is made available for purchase in Sears retail stores.
- November – Magnavox releases two new models consoles based on the Odyssey using chips developed by Texas Instruments, the Odyssey 100 and Odyssey 200. These consoles are pared down to play variants of the Ping Pong game from the original Odyssey – which is discontinued – and are much more successful.
  - Videomaster releases its Olympic Home T.V. Game model in the United Kingdom which plays six games.
  - Television Tennis is released by Executive Games in the United States.
- December – Philips releases the ES 2201 Tele-Spiel console in the Netherlands, an early console featuring interchangeable games similar to the original Odyssey.

== Business ==
- April 1 – San Diego Chargers football players Dennis Partee and Gary Garrison plus businessman Jim Pierce found the company Cinematronics Inc.
- April 4 – Micro-Soft is founded in Albuquerque, New Mexico, by Bill Gates and Paul Allen to focus on software for microprocessors.
- September 22 – Yasuhiro Fukushima founds the Eidansha Boshu Service Center in the Shinjuku district of Tokyo. The advertising business is later renamed Enix Corporation when they enter computer games.
- November 1 – Sammy Industry is established in Japan by Hajime Satomi, a split of the coin-operated amusement assets from his company Satomi Corporation.

== See also ==
- 1974 in games
