= 1976 in video games =

1976 was a mixed year for the expansion of the video game industry. While the consumer market in the United States for dedicated home consoles saw significant growth, the coin-operated video game market saw a decline despite individual hits. The year also marked the availability of some of the first computer game software for microcomputers, growing out of the hobbyist market.

In the U.S coin-operated games market, video games were largely stalled due to the reemergence of pinball as a popular category. Licensed tables like Bally’s Wizard (1975) and the creation of successful tables utilizing solid-state electronics allowed pinball to outpace video games. Smaller companies – particularly those who relied on the cocktail table market – failed to keep pace and many new games were not successful. Several of the top earning games of the year were the same as those of the year prior with only a few standout releases such as Sea Wolf.

Home consoles saw an explosion in interest in the U.S. after the successful 1975 Holiday season. Established companies like Atari and Magnavox created additional models sold throughout the year. New companies to the business adopted pre-made chips to create their own consoles, most prominently the General Instrument AY-3-8500 “Pong on a chip”. The most successful and lasting of these competitors was Coleco Industries who managed to outsell all their competition with their Telstar line of consoles. In Japan, the availability and development of dedicated console chips spurred the domestic market. The end of 1976 also saw the release of the first programmable home system with interchangeable ROM cartridges, Fairchild’s Video Entertainment System, the first console of the second generation.

Computer games continued to be shared via timesharing networks on mainframe systems at institutions and universities through this period. The most significant game introduced in 1976 was Adventure, the origin of the interactive fiction genre – which in turn led to action adventure games. Adventure was distributed via the ARPANET which allowed its influence to reach not only locations across the United States but into Europe through the nascent Internet. The PLATO network also featured advances in interactive experiences, including sophisticated role-playing games both single and multiplayer.

Microcomputers created for electronics enthusiasts proliferated after the introduction of the Altair 8800 in 1975. Several companies sold commercial game software targeted at hobbyists building computer kits. Many of these were adaptations of circulating BASIC games like Star Trek (1971) and others were made for specific computer addons – usually graphics boards. The software market for early microcomputers was largely based on trading rather than purchasing programs – which prompted Bill Gates to pen his famous An Open Letter to Hobbyists.

In Japan, video games took on greater importance in the coin-operated market as Sega, Taito, and Namco transitioned to give video games a greater focus. Taito found success importing games from Midway Mfg in the U.S. like Ball Park while Sega pushed the boundaries of transistor-transistor logic technology with games like Road Race. Namco, through its relationship with Atari, imported what would be the defining game of the first Japanese video game boom, Breakout.

== Events ==
- January 7–9 – The Winter Consumer Electronics Show is held in Las Vegas, Nevada. The show featured the first major appearance of video games in the form of dedicated home consoles.
- June 8 – Atari Inc. settles with Magnavox over the case related to their patents on the technology used in the Odyssey home game system.
- June 13–16 – In Chicago, Illinois the annual Summer Consumer Electronics Show is held. Numerous video game companies announce new products, including Fairchild’s Video Entertainment System.
- August – Larry Kaplan is hired into the home consumer programming group of Atari Inc. to work on games for the Video Computer System. He is joined thereafter by Alan Miller, Bob Whitehead, and David Crane – three of the original co-founders of Activision Inc.
- November 12–14 – The Music Operators of America show is held in Chicago. Voted game of the show by both RePlay and Play Meter magazines is Blockade by Gremlin Industries.

== Financial performance ==
=== United States ===
==== Arcade ====
Total unit sales: 54,000 cabinets.

Title	Arcade cabinet units (Estimates)	Manufacturer	Developer	Genre
Breakout	11,000	Atari Inc.	Atari Inc.	Action
Sea Wolf	10,000	Midway Manufacturing	Dave Nutting Associates	Multi-directional shooter
Sprint 2	8,200	Atari Inc.	Atari Inc.	Racing
Night Driver	2,100	Atari Inc.	Atari Inc.	Racing
Death Race	2,000	Exidy	Exidy	Racing

==== Most popular arcade games ====
RePlay magazine's Route and Arcade Survey was published in October 1976, including a chart of most popular games on location over the last several months. The lists compiled by RePlay were based on polling operators regarding their opinions of games receiving the most attention in their locations. RePlay's charts were based on only a subset of reports by operators and are not on imperial metrics such as earnings reports, but they give a strong indication of games which were of the most value to arcades and street locations.

The Profit Chart section of the survey included a top ten listing of games seen as most profitable by operators. This included two pinball games – Wizard by Bally (#3) and Captain Fantastic by Bally (#9) – as well as electro-mechanical game Daytona 500 (#10) by Allied Leisure. Four additional games were left in an unranked section: Trivia by Ramtek, Demolition Derby by Chicago Coin, Death Race by Exidy, and Bombs Away by Meadows Games.

	Arcade video games		
Rank	Title	Genre	Manufacturer
1	Sea Wolf	Fixed shooter	Midway Manufacturing
2	Gun Fight	Multi-directional shooter	Midway Manufacturing
4	Wheels	Racing	Midway Manufacturing
5	Indy 800	Racing	Atari Inc.
6	Breakout	Action	Atari Inc.
7	Indy 4	Racing	Atari Inc.
8	Bi-Plane	Multi-directional shooter	Fun Games

Home consoles

Total unit sales: 3.24 million–4 million consoles.

Total revenue (retail): $125–225 million.

Title	Game console units (1976)	Manufacturer	Developer
Telstar	>1,000,000	Coleco Industries	General Instrument/Alpex Computer
Video Entertainment System	50,000-60,000 40,000	Fairchild Semiconductor	Fairchild Semiconductor/Alpex Computer

=== Japan ===
Game Machine magazine published the results of their first annual survey of arcade operators in the country. This first survey only covered results as of the Japanese New Year's holiday. They received data from 49 locations, which were divided by a region. Respondents were asked to rank their most popular games from first to third place, with points allocated depending on their placement. The list was further divided between arcade games, medal games, and kiddie rides. The arcade game list included 27 named games, with 17 of them being video games.

Arcade video games			
Title	Points	Genre	Manufacturer
Ball Park (Note: Taito's release of the Midway Mfg game Tornado Baseball.)	34	Sports	Taito
Speed Race DX	26	Racing	Taito
Heavyweight Champ	20	Sports	Sega
Breakout	14	Action	Namco (Note: Atari's video games were released by Namco in the country at this time under the label of Atari Japan, which they purchased in 1974.)
Sea Wolf	10	Fixed shooter	Taito
LeMans	5	Racing	Namco
Kamikaze (Zero Fighter Kamikaze)	4	Fixed shooter	Fuji Enterprises
Sparkling Corner	3	Racing	Sega
Speed Race Twin	3	Racing	Taito
Indy 800	2	Racing	Namco
Night Driver	2	Racing	Namco
Rock n' Bark	2	Light gun shooter	Sega
Western Gun	2	Multi-directional shooter	Taito
Sprint 2	1	Racing	Namco
Road Race	1	Racing	Sega
Attack	1	Light gun shooter	Taito
Pong-Tron	1	Sports	Sega

== Notable releases ==
=== Games ===
- February – Nürburgring 1 is released by the German company Trakus. Created by Dr. Reiner Foerst, the racing game is among the first to feature 3-D graphics and object scaling. The units are created by hand with twenty-eight individual circuit boards powering the logic. Digital Games, Dave Nutting Associates, and Atari all develop games based on Nürburgring 1.
  - Sega releases Road Race, a third-person racing game with object scaling. The game is later rejiggered as motorcycle racing game Man T.T. which features soundtrack via an 8-track music player and haptic feedback when the vehicle crashes. It is released in the U.S. under the licensed name of Fonz – the first video game with an officially licensed media property.
  - Interceptor by Taito becomes available. The game features discrete object scaling in the context of a first-person flight shooting game.
  - Sea Wolf is released by Midway Mfg, a successful gallery target shooting game updating previous electro-mechanical games. The game features and early version of an electronic high score feature.
- April – Death Race by Exidy is released. The game causes the first controversy on video game violence when a reporter for the Associated Press writes about its graphic imagery.
- May – Atari Inc. ships Breakout. The game is a hit in the United States but becomes even bigger in Japan when it is released by Namco. Block breaker games in the country create the first video game boom.
- October – Heavyweight Champ by Sega premieres and features early one-on-one dueling between two human opponents, considered by some to be the first fighting game. (Note: RCA’s Fredotronic arcade system featured the game Swords by Joe Weisbecker which featured a fencing match. It was never released beyond its test market.)
- November – Sprint 2 is released by Atari Inc. under their Kee Games label. It is the first commercially released game to feature the technology of hardware sprites, patented by Steve Mayer and Ron Milner of Cyan Engineering.
- December – Blockade by Gremlin Industries is released. It serves as the origin for the snake game but is not very successful due to rampant cloning of the game by other companies.

=== Computer games ===
- William Crowther finishes work on Adventure or ADVENT, the pioneering interactive fiction game based on his caving experience and Dungeons & Dragons. He leaves the program to be discovered by others on the Bolt, Beranek and Newman server of the ARPANET, after which it proliferates to computer labs across the country.
- Gary Wisenhunt and Ray Wood complete the role-playing game dnd on the PLATO IV system. The game features a more structured style than the earlier The Dungeon, including an end boss.
- Moria by Kevet Duncombe and Jim Battin introduces a first-person, three-dimensional perspective to the multiplayer role-playing experiences of the PLATO IV system. The game features the ability for players to form a party and becomes massively influential in the PLATO ecosystem.
- March – SCELBI offers the book Scelbi's First Book of Computer Games for the "8008"/"8080" for sale. These are among the first games programmed specifically for microprocessors available for purchase.
- June – The company Cromemco ships the Dazzler, a graphics display board for S-100 compatible computers. Alongside the hardware, Cromemco offers several programs for the system on paper tape including implementations of tic-tac-toe and Life.
- September – Wargy I by Chris Crawford is developed for the IBM 1130. Crawford would go on to help define the academic field of video game design.
- December – Microchess is completed for the KIM-1 computer kit by Peter R. Jennings. It is among the most prolific early games on microcomputers.

=== Console games ===
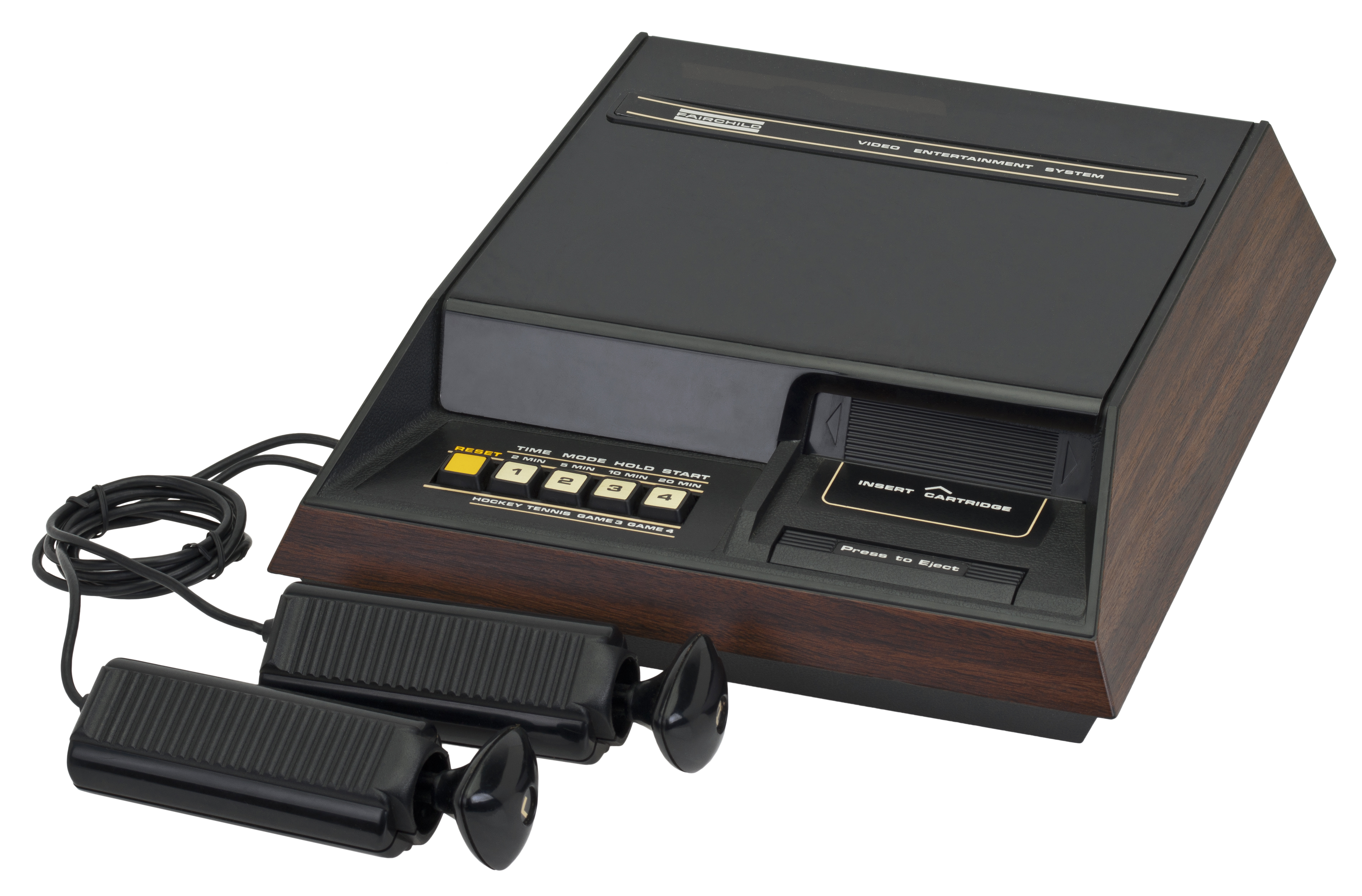
Fairchild Channel F

- February – General Instrument announces the availability of their AY-3-8500 integrated circuit made specifically for game-playing machines. The chip features six games, including four Pong-style games. The availability of the chip as an OEM part creates a mass proliferation of companies involved in the console business.
- June – Coleco ships the Telstar dedicated console using the AY-3-8500 chip. Due to their early awareness of the chip, Coleco received their full order and the Telstar line became the most popular set of systems in 1976.
- November – The Video Entertainment System – the first console to feature programmable cartridges – from Fairchild Semiconductor becomes available after several delays. Of the three launch titles, only Videocart-1 is broadly available due to manufacturing set backs. The console introduces the first pause feature to video games.

== Business ==
- April 1 – Apple Computer is founded by Steve Jobs, Steve Wozniak, and Ronald Wayne.
- April 20 – Data East Inc. is founded by Tetsuo Fukuda as an electronics measurement instrument manufacturer. The company becomes involved in coin-operated amusements and later video games.
- October 1 – Atari Inc. is purchased by Warner Communications to make it a wholly owned subsidiary. The deal amounts to $28 million to buy out the shareholders. Management remains in place, with Manny Gerard of the Warner Office of the President appointed to oversee the business.

== See also ==
- 1976 in games
