= Outlaw (1976 video game) =

1976 video game

- North American arcade flyer
- Developer: Atari, Inc.
- Publishers: NA: Atari, Inc.; JP: Namco
- Platform: Arcade
- Release: NA: March 1976
- Genre: Light gun shooter
- Mode: Single-player

Outlaw is a 1976 light gun shooter video game developed and published by Atari, Inc. for arcades. The game simulates an Old West fast draw duel between the player and the computer. Outlaw was developed under the name Marshall as a direct response to Midway's Gun Fight (1975). Along with Gun Fight, it was among the earliest Western genre-themed video games.

Outlaw was released in March 1976. A reviewer in Play Meter compared Outlaw to another Atari arcade release Quiz Show (1976) finding Outlaw to be superior. A retrospective review from Steve Fulton writing for Gamasutra (now Game Developer) said the game felt dated in comparison to the similarly themed Gun Fight.

Atari would later publish two other different Western-themed games titled Outlaw which featured different styles of gameplay: Outlaw for the Atari 2600 and Outlaw for iPhone and iPad.

== Gameplay ==
In Outlaw, players choose between two characters—Half-fast Pete, known for his accuracy, and Billy-The-Kid, who excels at quick draws. The goal is to outdraw and shoot an outlaw who appears randomly in town. Successful shots earn points, which contribute to end-of-game rankings like "Dude," "Greenhorn," and "Top Gun".

== Production ==
In their book Atari Inc.: Business is Fun (2012), authors Marty Goldberg and Curt Vendel described the game as an answer to Midway's popular game Gun Fight (1975). During development it was internally codenamed Marshall. Outlaw was among the early video game with a Western genre theme which arrived in the mid-1970s. Jeremy Saucier from The Strong said that unlike Gun Fight, Outlaw focused directly on the "gunfighter" style of Western films such as High Noon (1952) about fast-drawing outlaws and the player exacting justice on them through fast gunplay.

Like Atari's earlier arcades games such as Pong (1972), Outlaw had no microprocessor, but instead used individual TTL logic chips to implement the game logic. Outlaw was built into a custom arcade cabinet featuring a light gun. Character sprites were stored in ROM. The visual setting of the game—a stylized Old West street—was rendered using a physical screen overlay.

== Release and reception ==
Outlaw was released in March 1976. It was released in Japan in May 1976 where it was distributed by Namco.

A reviewer in Play Meter compared the title with another Atari arcade game Quiz Show, saying that Outlaw was the more "outstanding " release. The reviewer found it similar to Nintendo's arcade game Wild Gunman (1974) which also used a projection system. In 2007, Steve Fulton writing for Gamasutra (now Game Developer) dismissed Outlaw saying that the TTL technology was "showing its age", particularly in comparison to the sharper graphics and more thrilling gameplay seen in Gun Fight.

== Legacy ==
Outlaw was the second last arcade game Atari developed based on the TTL discreet logic format for arcades as the company had already began working on games with 8-bit microprocessors. The final game Atari developed using TTL was Breakout (1976).

Atari would release a game titled Outlaw in 1978 for the Atari Video Computer System. This game was different than the arcade game's light gun based gameplay, and more closely resembled Midway's Gun Fight (1975). Atari would also publish a game for iPhone and iPad developed by Flying Wisdom Studios titled Outlaw. Reviews of the game said the game was not a port of the arcade game or the Atari 2600 game.
