= Boot Hill (video game) =

1977 video game

- Arcade flyer
- Developer(s): Midway; Taito
- Platform(s): Arcade
- Release: NA: May 1977
- Genre(s): Multidirectional shooter
- Mode(s): Single-player, multiplayer

Boot Hill is a multidirectional shooter arcade video game released by Midway in 1977. It is a sequel to the 1975 video game Gun Fight, originally released by Taito as Western Gun in Japan. It was released under license from Taito, as Boot Hill is another version of Western Gun.

== Gameplay ==
Each player uses a small joystick to move their cowboy up and down the play area, while a second, larger joystick is used to aim the pistol and shoot. This larger stick also has a trigger button. The game's goal is to shoot the other player, situated on the opposite side of the game area, with the allocated 6 bullets. Wagons move up the middle and cacti litter the play area, both providing temporary cover from the opponent's gunfire and disintegrate when shot. The player may play against the machine or another person in two player mode.

== Reception ==
In the United States, the third annual RePlay arcade chart listed Boot Hill as the 11th highest-grossing arcade video game of 1977. The first annual Play Meter arcade chart listed Boot Hill as the 14th highest-grossing arcade game of 1977 (or 13th highest video game, excluding the electro-mechanical game F-1). RePlay later listed it as the 20th highest-grossing arcade game of 1978.

It was listed in the book 1001 Video Games You Must Play Before You Die.
