= Sprint 2 =

1976 video game

- Arcade flyer
- Developer: Kee Games
- Publishers: NA/EU: Kee Games; JP: Namco
- Designers: Dennis Koble; Lyle Rains
- Platform: Arcade
- Release: NA: November 2, 1976; EU: Late 1976; JP: June 1977
- Genre: Racing
- Modes: Single-player, multiplayer

Sprint 2 is a 1976 racing video game developed and published by Kee Games for arcades. While earlier driving games had computer-controlled cars that moved along a "canned predetermined" course, Sprint 2 "introduced the concept of a computer car that had the intelligence to drive itself around the track" in "a semi-intelligent" manner.

== Development ==
The team that developed Sprint 2 consisted of Dennis Koble, Wendi Allen (credited as Howard Delman), Dan Van Elderen and Lyle Rains. Both Koble and Rains do not recall who came up with the idea for the game. Rains would recall in an interview with Retro Gamer that the game was likely from Atari who wanted to release a new and improved driving game, as Gran Trak 10, Gran Trak 20, Indy 800 and LeMans games were moneymakers for Atari and its customers.

The game was one of Atari's first mass-produced microprocessor based games. Rains recalled that this allowed them to make the game faster and more exciting than earlier racing games. Koble said that he had to immerse himself in 6502 programming for the game. Sprint 2 was designed to be an update of the previous games, leading the team to remove unwanted features, such as driving in reverse from Gran Trak 20 as well as removing a brake pedal as stepping off the accelerator pedal was the equivalent of a brake. Other features remained such as the timer, with Rains stating that it had not occurred to the team to base the game around laps over a timer.

Sprint 2 is a first racing game that introduced the concept of a computer-controlled car that had the intelligence to drive itself around the track, without a predetermined course, based on how well the player was doing. Rains stated that this was his idea. To do so, he created a map of vectors to tell the computer-controlled cars which way they should drive. They would align themselves to the current vector and drive themselves around the track in a non-repeating path. Koble created the graphics for the game, stating that the artists employed by Atari at the time were only making side panel and control panel artwork and were not involved with the game's creation.

== Reception ==
In the United States, Sprint 2 was the second highest-earning arcade video game of 1977, below Sea Wolf. It was also second highest-earning arcade video game of 1978, below Space Wars, along with Sprint 1 in third place. Sprint 2 was later the third highest-earning arcade video game of 1979, below Space Invaders and Atari Football.

The game was a commercial success for Namco in Japan, where Sprint 2 was the seventh highest-earning arcade video game of 1977. It was also among the year's top four highest-earning racing video games, below Taito's Speed Race DX and Road Champion, and tied with Taito's Super High-Way.

== Legacy ==
Sprint 2 was the first in a long series of games, some of which bore its name into the 1980s:

- Sprint 4 and Sprint 8, a 4 player and 8 player version respectively, were released in 1977. Both were full color raster versions of the game.
- Sprint 1 was released in 1978. The "1" and "2" designations reflect the number of players, rather than indicating it was a prequel.
- Super Sprint, a 3 player version with updated graphics, was released by Atari Games in 1986.
- Championship Sprint, a 2 player version of Super Sprint, was released by Atari Games in 1986.
- Badlands, a 2 player post-apocalyptic setting update of Championship Sprint, was released in 1989.
- NeoSprint, an 8 player version with 3D graphics, was released by Atari in 2024.

Sprint 2 was one of the first Atari products to feature the now well-known "Atari arcade font" (first introduced in the Quiz Show).

In 2016 a reverse engineered version to JavaScript became available.
