= Lyle Rains =

American video game designer

Lyle Rains was a senior executive at the arcade game company Atari and conceptualized the original idea for Asteroids, which was then developed and implemented by Ed Logg. Rains reportedly called Logg into his office and said "Well, why don’t we have a game where you shoot the rocks and blow them up?"

Rains also served as Executive Producer for a large number of Atari coin-op games. An avid gamer, he wrote a popular online FAQ for the Atari coin-op game KLAX.

Rains also had creative input in Cyberball (1988), where he suggested a football game where opponents could input plays while being blocked from seeing each other's screens.

He joined old compatriot video game designers in a new company called Innovative Leisure headed by Seamus Blackley in 2012 to design games for phones.

== Game credits ==
- Tank (1974)
- Jet Fighter (1975)
- Steeplechase (1975)
- Sprint 2 (1976) - also credited with designing the well-known 'Atari arcade font'.
- Sprint 4 (1977)
- Atari Football (1978)
- Sky Raider (1978) - game designer
- Asteroids (1979)
- Hard Drivin' (1988)
- Race Drivin' (1990)
- Space Lords (1992)
