= Heavyweight Champ =

1976 video game

- Arcade flyer for the 1987 game
- Developer: Sega
- Designer: Norio Yasuda
- Platform: Arcade
- Release: October 1976 (original); September 1987 (remake)
- Genre: Sports

Heavyweight Champ (Note: Japanese: ヘビーウェイトチャンプ, Hepburn: Hebīweito Chanpu) is a series of boxing video games from Sega. The original arcade video game was released in 1976. The game uses black-and-white graphics and critics have since identified it as the first video game to feature hand-to-hand fighting. It was a commercial success in Japan, where it was the third highest-grossing arcade video game of 1976. However, it is now considered a lost video game.

Sega released a remake to arcades in 1987, changing the side perspective of the original game to a third-person viewpoint from behind the boxer. Both games feature unique controls that simulate throwing actual punches. The 1987 remake was Japan's fifth highest-grossing arcade video game of 1988 and received positive reviews from critics.

== Gameplay ==
The 1976 game has monochrome graphics and side-view perspective.

The 1976 original features gameplay viewed from a side-view perspective. It employs two boxing glove controllers, one for each player, which move up and down for high and low punches, with an inward movement for striking. It uses large monochrome sprite visuals for the graphics.

The 1987 game changed the perspective to behind the player's boxer. In addition, the player is given two punch controllers, one for each hand. Only a single-player mode is available, in which the player faces a series of opponents in one-round, three-minute bouts. Players can swivel the cabinet to move their boxer from side to side.

== Reception ==
The original 1976 game was a commercial success in Japan. On the first annual Game Machine arcade chart, Heavyweight Champ was the third highest-grossing arcade video game of 1976 in Japan, just below Taito's Ball Park and Speed Race DX.

The 1987 remake was also a commercial success. In Japan, Game Machine listed the 1987 version on their November 15 issue as being the fourth most-successful upright arcade unit of the month. It went on to become Japan's fifth highest-grossing dedicated arcade game of 1988.

The 1987 remake was also critically well-received. Advanced Computer Entertainment and Commodore User praised the game's unique controls but raised concerns that they might decrease the lifespan of the cabinets. Commodore User also had positive impressions of the game's graphics and gave the game a 9 out of 10 overall.

== Legacy ==
Sega reused the Heavyweight Champ name when they released the Sega Master System version of James "Buster" Douglas Knockout Boxing outside of North America. The game features a side perspective and is otherwise unrelated to the arcade games. It was not received well.

Heavyweight Champ's 1976 version was the first video game to ever depict a Black person.

The 1991 Sega arcade game Title Fight also featured controls for left and right punches and a similar behind-the-boxer perspective as the 1987 game, along with two-player gameplay through use of a dual-monitor cabinet.

== See also ==
- List of Sega arcade games
