= Super Bug (video game) =

1977 video game

- Developer: Kee Games
- Publisher: Kee Games
- Designer: Wendi Allen
- Platform: Arcade
- Release: NA: September 1977
- Genre: Racing
- Mode: Single-player

Super Bug is an arcade video game developed and released by Kee Games (a subsidiary of Atari, Inc.) in 1977. The player steers a yellow Volkswagen Beetle (or "Bug") along a multi-directionally scrolling track, avoiding the boundaries and occasional obstacles. The game ends when fuel runs out. Super Bug is in black and white, and the colored car comes from a yellow overlay in the center of the monitor.

The 1978 Atari arcade game Fire Truck is based on Super Bug. Both games were programmed by Wendi Allen (credited as Howard Delman).

== Development ==
Originally titled City Driver, the video game Super Bug was the first to be designed and programmed by Wendi Allen. Allen stated in an interview that she had to learn a lot about the game development process during the nine months it took to create Super Bug.

Joe Decuir of Atari was writing a version of the game for Atari 8-bit computers which was never completed.

== Reception ==
In the United States, it was among the top 35 highest-grossing arcade games of 1977, according to RePlay. It went on to become the fourth highest-grossing arcade game of 1978 according to Play Meter, or the year's fifth highest according to RePlay. It was later the 19th highest-grossing arcade video game of 1979, according to Play Meter.
