= Rebound (video game) =

1974 arcade game

- Flyer
- Developer: Atari
- Publishers: Atari, Inc.
- Platform: Arcade
- Release: NA: February 1974
- Genre: Sports
- Mode: Multiplayer

Rebound is a two-player sports arcade video game developed by Atari and released in February 1974. In the game, two players each control paddles on either side of a volleyball net, with a ball dropped from the top of the screen. The players bounce the ball back and forth across the net with the goal of scoring points by having the ball reach the bottom or side of the other player's half of the screen, with the trajectory of the ball dependent on where it strikes the paddle. The winner is the first player to reach eleven or fifteen points, depending on the game settings.

Development of Rebound began in late 1973, as one of several variations they produced in 1974 on the gameplay of the successful Pong (1972), Atari's first game and the fourth-ever arcade video game. Around the same time, Atari launched Kee Games, a subsidiary meant to produce clone games of Atari's products and act as a competitor in order to expand into more distribution channels in the same region than the industry typically supported. Kee's first game, released in March 1974, was Spike, a clone of Rebound, which added a "spike" button to the game that made the paddle jump up and attempt to bounce the ball downwards instead of up. In addition to the base game, Atari sold a conversion kit to convert any Atari two-player Pong variant into Rebound, and in 1977 Rebound was included in Video Olympics for the Atari 2600, a collection of Pong variants.

== Gameplay ==
Screenshot of gameplay; the two players are tied at 0 points, the net is at its lowest level, and the ball is falling from the top towards the left side.

Rebound is a two-player volleyball sports game in which the players, each controlling a paddle representing a person on either side of a volleyball net, attempt to score points. The horizontal paddles are moved by the players left and right on their side of the net, represented by a short dashed line. The ball, represented by a square dot, is dropped from the top of the screen in a parabolic arc; if it hits a player's paddle, it bounces in another arc according to where on the paddle it hit. Bounces from closer to the center are more vertical, while those towards the sides move mostly horizontally. This method of changing the angle of deflection is similar to the mechanics of Pong (1972), Atari's first arcade game.

If the ball reaches the bottom of the screen without being deflected by a paddle, bounces on the same paddle four times, hits the net, or is deflected into the side of the screen, then a sound is played and a point is awarded to the player on the opposing side. After a point is scored, the ball is dropped from the top of the screen again. Every two times the ball is bounced across the net by the players without a point being scored the net is grows slightly higher, up to ten times; it resets in height when a point is scored. Two large numbers at the top of the screen record the points for each player. Each game costs a quarter, and machines can be set to play one or two rounds per game. Rounds can be set to play until a player reaches either eleven or fifteen points. Whenever a game is won, the game resets into its "attract mode", where the paddles are stretched across the screen, allowing the ball to bounce along to the side and be re-dropped indefinitely. Atari subsidiary Kee Games made a version of the game named Spike, which was functionally almost identical with the addition of a "spike" button; this button made the player's paddle jump into the air, potentially bouncing the ball into a downward trajectory like a volleyball spike.

== Development ==
A Spike arcade cabinet, featuring a different cabinet than Rebound but nearly identical graphics and controls, with the addition of two "spike' buttons

Rebound was developed by Atari beginning in late 1973; the final schematics are dated November 31, 1973, and use the code name "Volleyball". 1973 was near the beginning of the start of the arcade game industry; after the success of Atari's Pong (1972), the first game by the new company and fourth arcade game ever produced, the nascent industry was largely composed of variations on the concept, called "ball-and-paddle games". While Atari created games with other gameplay types in 1973 and 1974, such as Space Race (1973) and Gran Trak 10 (1974), it also created several Pong-like games. Rebound was a variation on that theme, featuring controls and gameplay similar to Pong, with the addition of gravity arcing the ball and both paddles moved to the bottom of the screen. Rebound was released by Atari in February 1974, with a release announcement on February 16. Other Atari ball-and-paddle games from 1974 include Superpong and Quadrapong, both of which were variations on the original Pong gameplay.

The arcade game market is split into manufacturers, distributors, and operators; manufacturers like Atari sell game machines to distributors—who handle several types of electronic machines—who in turn sell them to the operators of locations. In the early 1970s, distributors bought games on an exclusive basis, meaning that only one distributor in each distribution region would carry products from a given arcade game manufacturer, restricting the manufacturer to only the operators that distributor sold to. Atari, in 1973 just over a year old and largely based on their hit first game Pong, felt that as a smaller manufacturer this setup severely limited their ability to sell arcade games: they could only contract with a limited number of distributors, who would only buy a limited number of games per year. To work around this, Atari set up a secret subsidiary company in September 1973, Kee Games, which was intended to sell clones of Atari's games, in effect doubling their potential reach. The first such game by Kee, released in March 1974, was Spike, a clone of Rebound with the addition of the "spike" button that made the paddle jump up to attempt to knock the ball downwards; other than that addition it is functionally the same game.

== Legacy ==
Rebound has been described by Retro Gamer as one of the more notable Pong variants. Despite this, unlike many other games of the time Atari did not make a sequel game. Sales numbers are not available for Rebound or Spike; additionally, a table made in 1976 by Ralph H. Baer in his book Videogames: In the Beginning containing sales numbers for most games of the time period does not contain any numbers for the two games. In addition to the stand-alone game, Atari sold conversion kits which could modify any two-player Pong variant they produced into a Rebound game. The kits included a circuit board to plug in to the existing game and decal stickers to cover up the original name on the cabinets with "Rebound". In 1977, Rebound was included as one of the games in Video Olympics for the Atari 2600 home video game console, a collection of Pong variants, as "Volleyball".

== Sources ==
- Baer, Ralph H. (2005-04-26). Videogames: In the Beginning. Rolenta Press. ISBN 978-0-9643848-1-1.
- Goldberg, Marty; Vendel, Curt (2012-11-25). Atari Inc.: Business Is Fun. Syzygy Press. ISBN 978-0-9855974-0-5.
- Williams, Andrew (2017-03-16). History of Digital Games: Developments in Art, Design and Interaction. CRC Press. ISBN 978-1-317-50381-1.
- Wolf, Mark J. P. (2007-11-30). The Video Game Explosion: A History from PONG to PlayStation and Beyond. Greenwood Publishing Group. ISBN 978-0-313-33868-7.
