= Indy 800 =

1975 video game

- North American arcade flyer
- Developer(s): Kee Games
- Publisher(s): NA: Kee Games; JP: Nakamura Seisakusho
- Platform(s): Arcade
- Release: NA: April 1975; JP: September 1975
- Genre(s): Racing
- Mode(s): Multiplayer

Indy 800 is a 1975 racing video game developed and published by Kee Games (a subsidiary of Atari, Inc.) for arcades; in Japan, it was distributed by Nakamura Seisakusho (Namco).

== Gameplay ==
Gameplay is a simulation of an Indianapolis 500 style race, in which up to eight players compete by racing each other with simulated IndyCar race cars. The players race blocky cars around a simple track with a top-down overhead view. The player car colors are purple, peach, yellow, green, light blue, white, red and dark blue.

== Technology ==
The game is housed in a large custom rectangular cabinet that takes up 16 square feet (1.5 m^{2}). Each side of the cabinet has two steering wheels and four pedals. The 25-inch monitor is set in to the top face of the cabinet and looked down upon. The game uses a full color RGB display and does not use color overlays.

The processing electronics consist of a card cage that includes a "Backplane" or "Motherboard", eight identical car function boards, and three unique, common processing boards that the backplane board supports and interconnects. Each of the eleven boards has its own onboard fixed 5-volt regulator IC. All of the logic circuitry is TTL, and no microprocessors are used.

Each game was sold with two spare car boards and one each of the three processing boards, so that the game owner could repair it by simple circuit board substitution. Two "card extender" boards were furnished with each game sold that enabled technicians to probe individual components on suspect boards while they were still operating in the game. A complete set of circuit board logic diagrams was also furnished, as was a set of schematics for the modified GE color monitor.

The cabinet also features overhead mirrors to allow spectators to watch the game while it's being played.

== Reception ==
In March 1976, the first annual RePlay arcade chart listed Indy 800 as the fourth highest-earning arcade video game of 1975 in the United States, below Tank, Wheels and Gun Fight. Later in October, RePlay listed Indy 800 again as the fourth highest-earning arcade video game of 1976 in the United States, below Sea Wolf, Gun Fight and Wheels. In Japan, it was the tenth highest-grossing arcade video game of 1976.

== Legacy ==
- A clone of the game, bearing the same name, was released by Atari subsidiary Kee Games.
- Indy 800 was followed up the following year with a smaller 4 player version entitled Indy 4.
- A scaled down version of Indy 800 was a launch title for the Atari 2600 in 1977, renamed Indy 500.
