= 1977 in video games =

1977 had sequels such as Super Speed Race and Datsun 280 ZZZAP as well as several new titles such as Space Wars. The year's highest-grossing arcade games were F-1 and Speed Race DX in Japan, and Sea Wolf and Sprint 2 in the United States. The year's best-selling home system was Nintendo's Color TV-Game, which was only sold in Japan.

== Financial performance ==
=== Highest-grossing arcade games ===
==== Japan ====
In Japan, the following titles were the highest-grossing arcade games of 1977, according to the second annual Game Machine chart. Both arcade video games and electro-mechanical games (EM games) are listed on the same arcade chart. Namco's EM racing game F-1 was the highest-grossing overall arcade game for the second year in a row, followed by Taito's racing video game Speed Race DX (its predecessor Speed Race was distributed as Wheels by Midway Manufacturing in North America).

Arcade electro-mechanical games (EM games)						Arcade video games					
Rank	Title	#1	#2	#3	Points	Rank	Title	#1	#2	#3	Points
1	F-1	12	6	5	53	1	Speed Race DX	8	5	8	42
2	Mogura Taiji (Whac-A-Mole)	5	1	3	20	2	Breakout	3	6	4	25
3	Shoot Away	4	3	0	18	3	Scratch	2	5	3	19
4	Flipper (Pinball) (Note: フリッパー, Furippā)	3	0	3	12	4	Circus	0	2	3	7
5	F-1 Mach	0	5	0	10	5	Road Champion	1	1	1	6
6	Shooting Trainer	1	2	1	8	6	Superbowl	1	1	0	5
7	Laser Clay	2	0	0	6	7	Sprint 2	1	0	1	4
8	Block Cut (Note: ブロック・カット, Burokku Katto)	0	2	0	4	7	Super High-Way	0	2	0	4
9	Dead Line	1	0	0	3	9	Gran Trak 10	1	0	0	3
10	Heli-Shooter	0	0	2	2	9	Man T.T.	1	0	0	3
10	Crane (Note: クレーン, Kurēn)	0	0	2	2	9	Super Speed Race	1	0	0	3

Note: Medal games are listed on a separate chart, with Nintendo's EVR Race being the highest-grossing medal game for the second year in a row.

==== United States ====
In the United States, Play Meter magazine began publishing annual lists of top-grossing arcade games in 1977. The following titles were the top ten highest-earning arcade video games of the year on the annual Play Meter and RePlay charts. Lifetime arcade cabinet sales are also given in a separate column.

Rank	Play Meter	RePlay	Lifetime cabinet sales
1	Sea Wolf		10,000
2	Sprint 2		8,200
3	Breakout		11,000
4	LeMans	Drag Race	Unknown
5	Gun Fight (Western Gun)	Starship 1	Unknown
6	Night Driver	Double Play	Unknown
7	Death Race	Night Driver	Unknown
8	Tornado Baseball	Bazooka	Unknown
9	Datsun 280 ZZZAP	Robot Bowl	Unknown
10	Blockade	Datsun 280 ZZZAP	Unknown
10	Indy 4	Datsun 280 ZZZAP	Unknown

=== Best-selling home systems ===
Rank	System(s)	Manufacturer(s)	Type	Generation	Sales	Ref
1	Color TV-Game	Nintendo	Console	First	800,000	
2	Atari Video Computer System (Atari VCS)	Atari, Inc.	Console	Second	250,000	
3	Personal computer (PC)	Various	Computer	—N/a	150,000	
4	TRS-80	Tandy Corporation	Computer	8-bit	100,000	
5	Altair 8800	MITS	Computer	8-bit	10,000	
6	Commodore PET	Commodore International	Computer	8-bit	4,000	
7	Apple II	Apple Inc.	Computer	8-bit	600	

== Events ==
- Agnes Kim opens the first Electronics Boutique, a kiosk at the King of Prussia Mall in King of Prussia, Pennsylvania selling transistor radios and calculators.
- Atari opens the first Chuck E. Cheese's Pizza Time Theater (later Chuck E. Cheese's), a combination video arcade/pizzeria conceived by Atari co-founder Nolan Bushnell. In June, Bushnell purchases the rights to Pizza Time Theater back from Atari for $500,000 USD.
- Nakamura Manufacturing Ltd. formally changes its name to Namco (which it has employed as a brand name since 1971), and establishes Namco Enterprises Asia Ltd. in Hong Kong, its first subsidiary based outside Japan.

== Notable releases ==
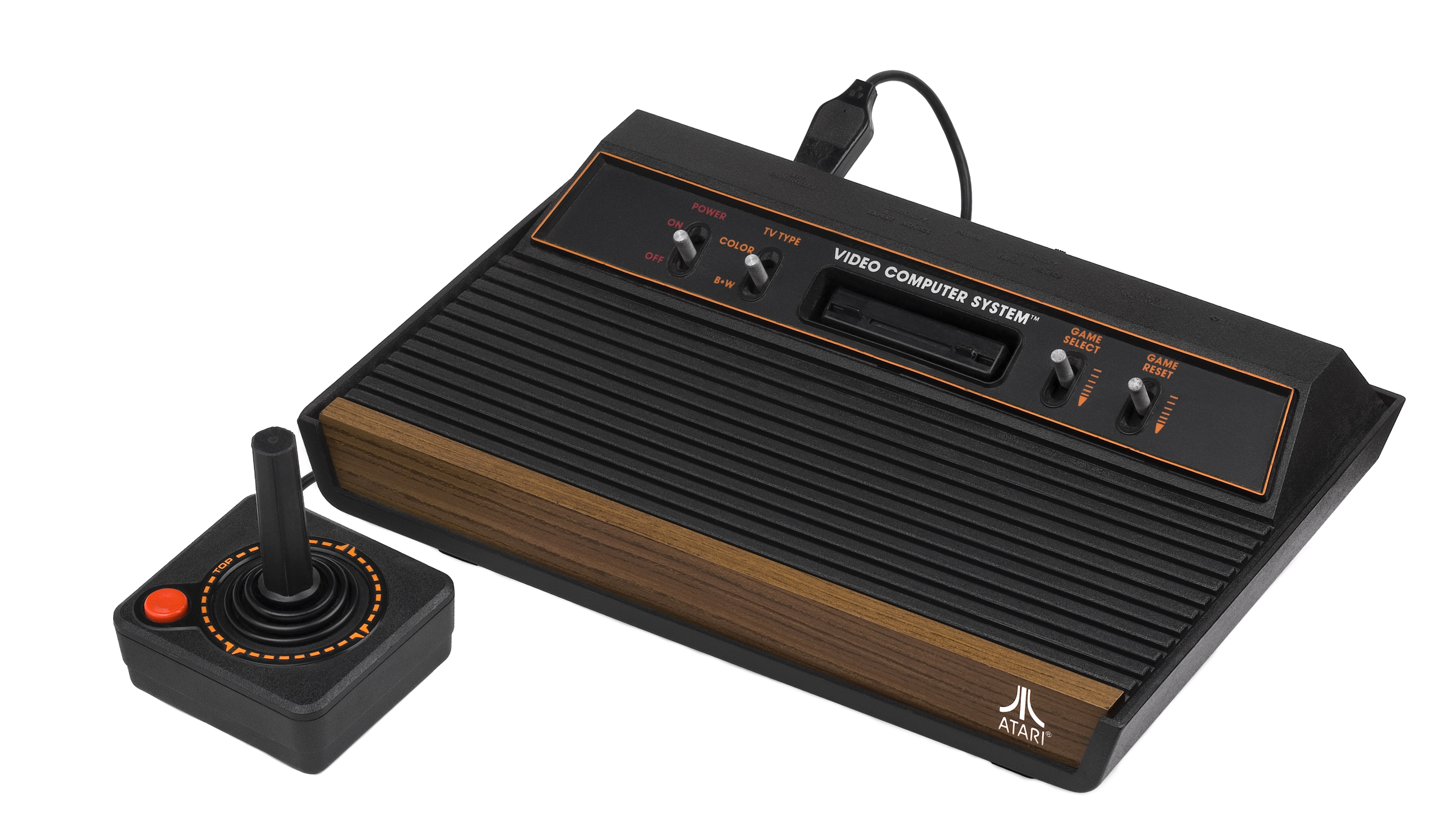
The Atari Video Computer System was the most successful video game console of the second-generation era.

=== Video game consoles ===
- In January, RCA Corporation releases the Studio II video game console.
- In September, Atari releases the Atari Video Computer System (later known as the VCS or Atari 2600) video game console alongside nine launch titles in the USA.
- Coleco releases a number of new models of the Telstar series: the Telstar Alpha, the Telstar Colormatic, the Telstar Regent, the Telstar Ranger, the Telstar Galaxy, and the Telstar Combat. Most of these systems feature only minor variations on the original Telstar model, such as new controller types (for example, the Ranger featured a light gun, while the Galaxy included joysticks).
- Groupe SEB releases the Telescore 750 dedicated home video game console.
- Nintendo releases the Color TV-Game 6 dedicated home video game console, featuring six variations of Light Tennis (a Pong clone). Nintendo's partner, Mitsubishi, produces most of the system's hardware components.
- Philico releases the Telejogo dedicated home video game console, featuring three pre-installed games.
- Bally releases the Bally Home Library Computer (Astrocade) home video game console through mail order retailer JS&A National Sales Group. Delays in production of the system, however, mean that none of the units actually ship until the following year.

=== Home computers ===
- June 10 – Apple Computer releases the Apple II.
- August 3 – Tandy releases the TRS-80 Model I.
- October – Commodore releases the Commodore PET.
- Intelligent Systems releases the Compucolor II.

=== Games ===
- Cinematronics releases Larry Rosenthal's Space Wars, the first vector graphics arcade game.
- Tim Anderson, Marc Blank, Bruce Daniels, and Dave Lebling, the future founders of Infocom, develop the first version of Zork on a PDP-10 at the Massachusetts Institute of Technology Laboratory for Computer Science.
- While studying for a Ph.D. at the University of Virginia, Kelton Flinn begins developing a text-based aerial combat game called Air, an early precursor to 1987's Air Warrior, the first massively multiplayer online game.

== See also ==
- 1977 in games
