= Pursuit (video game) =

1975 video game

- Arcade flyer
- Developer: Kee Games
- Publisher: Kee Games
- Platform: Arcade
- Release: NA: January 1975
- Genre: Combat flight simulator
- Mode: Single-player

Pursuit is a 1975 combat flight simulator video game developed and published by Kee Games for arcades. The player controls a World War I flying ace who tries to shoot down enemy planes. Gameplay is from a first person perspective.

== Gameplay ==
The player uses a flight stick to steer the plane up, down, right, and left to get the enemy in his or her sights. The top-mounted fire button is then used to shoot the enemy plane and gain points.

== Release ==
The game is housed in a custom wide cabinet modeled to look like a World War I biplane cockpit. It includes a similarly modeled flight stick with top-mounted fire button. The game's PCB is composed of discrete technology and includes Atari/Kee's Durastress technology. One overlay provides the onscreen crosshair.

== See also ==
- Red Baron (1980)
