= Gran Trak 10 =

1974 video game

- North American arcade flyer
- Developers: Atari; Cyan Engineering
- Publishers: NA: Atari; JP: Namco
- Designers: Larry Emmons; Allan Alcorn
- Platform: Arcade
- Release: NA: May 1974; JP: September 1974
- Genre: Racing
- Mode: Single-player

Gran Trak 10 is a racing video game developed by Atari, Inc. through its subsidiary Cyan Engineering, and released by Atari for arcades in May 1974. The player drives a car along a race track viewed from above, avoiding walls of pylons and trying to pass as many checkpoints as possible before time runs out. The game is controlled with a steering wheel, accelerator and brake pedals, and a gear stick, and the car crashes and spins if it hits a pylon.

Atari founder Nolan Bushnell had originally planned to develop a driving video game inspired by Chicago Coin's arcade electro-mechanical game Speedway (1969) when he founded the company, but cancelled it in favor of a simpler game, Pong (1972). Atari eventually began development on a driving video game, Gran Trak 10, in late 1973. It was initially designed by Larry Emmons of Cyan, with the mechanical design handled by Eigen Systems, though after several design and production problems were uncovered during an initial small production run in March 1974 the design was overhauled by Allan Alcorn, the designer of Pong, with wider distribution beginning in May. The game's circuits include possibly the first instance of integrated circuit-based read-only memory (ROM), which thereafter became the standard for arcade games, replacing diode-stored graphics.

Gran Trak 10 was developed during a time of several internal changes at Atari; as a result communication problems led Atari to not accurately track the expense of manufacturing the game. It was initially sold to distributors for a net loss of US$100 per cabinet; although this flaw was fixed, it contributed to a total loss of $500,000 for the company that fiscal year, placing Atari in financial difficulties. The game itself was successful, and led to several versions of the game being produced in 1974 by Atari and its subsidiary Kee Games, including a smaller cabinet version titled Trak 10 and a two-player version titled Gran Trak 20, as well as numerous later racing games. Gran Trak 10 was the first arcade car driving video game, though Atari had released the spaceship racing game Space Race in 1973, and a simple racing game, Wipeout, was included with the 1972 Magnavox Odyssey console.

== Gameplay ==
Gran Trak 10 is a single-player racing video game in which the player drives a race car along a race track, shown from above. The player controls the car with a steering wheel, accelerator and brake pedals, and gear stick, as in a real car. The gear shifting requires the player to shift between reverse, first, second, and third gears as needed, but the pedals are digital controls rather than analog, so the player cannot control his speed by applying differing levels of pressure. The steering wheel turns the car only while it is being turned, rather than having a neutral "straight" position. Braking does not stop the car instantly and turning while braking will cause the car to skid. The course is defined on the screen by walls of white dots representing pylons, which if hit stop the car and spin it. There is only a single track layout. The track contains one black path representing an oil slick, which prevents the player's car from turning. At the top of the screen are two numbers; the number on the right is the remaining time in the game, starting at 78 and counting down by 2s, while the number on the left is the number of checkpoints the player has passed, and counts up by 2s.

The time per game, though the counter always starts at 78, is by default 105 seconds and is adjustable by the game operator; changing the time adjusts both the speed of the counter and how long a player spends crashed after hitting a pylon. A switch on the internal circuit board can turn off crashes entirely, while another allows for two games to be played for a quarter rather than one. A placard on the front of the game gives suggested ratings for the score in a given game, from "License Revoked" for 10 or fewer points to "Real Pro" for greater than 40; the operator's manual suggests changing or removing this card if the time per game is adjusted.

== Development ==
Time has run out at 8 points, in a Gran Trak 10 cabinet.

In 1972, Atari founder Nolan Bushnell considered creating a driving video game as one of the company's first games, inspired by Chicago Coin's first-person electro-mechanical game Speedway (1969). He decided not to pursue the idea, however, due to the perceived complexity. In late 1973, Atari revisited the idea of a driving video game, unrelated to any prior arcade game. The design was instead created by Cyan Engineering, which had recently become a semi-independent research and development subsidiary of Atari and had previously handled the prototype design of Gotcha. Larry Emmons developed the circuits to control the car itself in the game, creating the feel of braking, acceleration, and movement. Emmons also used integrated circuit-based memory—specifically, mask ROM (read-only memory)—in his circuit design to store graphical data such as the tracks, rather than the diode arrays that previous arcade games used. This is believed to be the first use of integrated circuit-based memory in an arcade game, and ROMs thereafter became the standard for arcade and console video games. The mechanical designs for the game, including the steering wheel, pedal, and gear shift controllers, were developed by Eigen Systems, located in the same building as Cyan and founded by ex-coworkers of the Cyan founders Emmons and Steven Mayer. At one point, the game's design included a small printer that would print high scores when achieved, but this was removed prior to the final design.

Allan Alcorn, the designer of Pong, took a leave of absence from the company beginning in September 1973, and around the same time Steve Bristow, who had previously worked with the founders of Atari on the first arcade video game Computer Space, left to co-found Kee Games. This in turn left Lloyd Warman, new to the company, as the head of engineering for Atari during Gran Trak's development. Alcorn and Emmons have stated that they believed Warman was a good engineer but a poor project manager, which led to the Gran Trak project running behind schedule and having several design problems. This was exacerbated by a new short-lived Atari management team and product development structure, which led to several communication problems and cost overruns. When Atari began production in early 1974, it had difficulties getting enough circuits to build the cabinets from National Semiconductor, who cited a "hybrid" integrated circuit design by Emmons as non-standard, first refusing to sell them to Atari and then producing only small production runs. According to Alcorn, the non-standard design was a tactic to prevent competitors from copying the design, as other manufacturers would be unable to produce it at all.

A short run of Gran Trak systems was produced in March 1974 and revealed other design problems, such as the steering controls; in their prototype system, Eigen used a real car steering wheel and pedals, but the production run used different parts. Alcorn returned to Cyan that month and redesigned the game to fix the flaws and use more standard parts; the copying protection scheme was changed to use a custom-designed integrated circuit that was named the same as a standard Texas Instruments integrated circuit. Alcorn later stated in an interview that neither Warman nor Emmons understood the challenges in converting a prototype design to a product that could be manufactured. The game entered production soon after, and Atari announced it was shipping a full production run in May 1974. Although the design flaws were fixed, the communication problems during development led to one final problem with the game: Atari was unclear on the actual cost of producing the game. As a result, a single Gran Trak game ended up costing US$1,095 to manufacture, while Atari was selling them to distributors for only $995, losing $100 per sale. Atari soon corrected the problem, but ended the fiscal year with a large loss due in part to the financial failure of the game.

== Reception and legacy ==
Atari reported a loss of $500,000 for the 1974 fiscal year, roughly as much as the previous year's profits, with Gran Trak as one of the major causes. This led Atari into deep financial problems, leaving part of Gran Trak's legacy being "the game that nearly put Atari out of business". In September 1974, Atari merged with its subsidiary Kee Games; Kee's final game Tank, released that November, was a commercial success, however, and is credited with buoying the finances of the newly merged Atari at a critical time for the company. The Gran Trak 10 game itself, after its problems were resolved, was considered a success, and Atari released multiple versions of it: a clone version titled Formula K was released through Kee Games for different distributors around July 1974, and Atari produced a small cabinet version in late in the year titled Trak 10. According to Ralph H. Baer, Formula K sold 6,000 units. A two-player version titled Gran Trak 20 was released in August, along with its own clone version from Kee Games titled Twin Racer and its own small cabinet version, Trak 20. Baer estimates that Gran Trak 20 sold 4,500 units.

In March 1976, RePlay magazine published a survey of the top 20 arcade games in use, and listed Gran Trek 10 and 20 combined as the fifth highest-earning game in the prior year in the United States, below Tank, Wheels, Gun Fight and Indy 800. In Japan, it was among the top ten highest-earning arcade video games of 1977, and among the year's top seven racing video games (topped by Taito's Speed Race DX).

Atari produced numerous other racing arcade games in the same style as Gran Trak, including LeMans (1976), Sprint 2 (1976), Super Sprint (1986), and Badlands (1989). Gran Trak 10 was the first arcade car racing video game and the first video game to use a steering wheel, for which it has been called the "grandfather" of car racing video games. Prior to Gran Trak 10, a simple racing game, Wipeout, had been released in 1972 for the Magnavox Odyssey home video game console and a spaceship racing arcade game, Space Race, had been released by Atari in 1973. Gran Trak 10 had an influence on Taito game designer Tomohiro Nishikado; while he did not enjoy the game due to its twisting tracks and complex controls, it inspired him to develop his own driving video game, by adapting two older electro-mechanical games, Kasco's Mini Drive (1958) and Taito's Super Road 7 (1970), into the video game Speed Race (1974).
