= Shoot Away =

1977 video game

- Developer: Namco
- Publisher: Namco
- Designers: Kazunori Sawano; Sho Osugi
- Series: Shoot Away
- Platforms: Arcade, Mobile
- Release: JP: 1977; NA: 1978
- Genres: Light gun shooter, skeet shooting

Shoot Away (Note: Japanese: シュータウェイ, Hepburn: Shūto Au~ei) is a 1977 electro-mechanical (EM) light gun shooter arcade game developed and published by Namco. Players use the shotgun-shaped light guns to fire at clay pigeons, represented as flying white dots on a projector screen. There are two that must be shot down in each round, and players only get two bullets to hit them. Bonus points are awarded for shooting the pigeons as soon as they appear, or by destroying both of them with a single bullet. The game was a critical and commercial success, maintaining a presence in arcades into the 1980s.

== Gameplay ==
Shoot Away is a lightgun shooter arcade game that simulates the sport of skeet shooting. It uses a projector system that projects monochrome images against a panoramic backdrop, designed to resemble a forest clearing. Using the attached lightguns, players have two attempts to shoot at both white targets — representing clay pigeons — that arch across the screen. Both players' scores are shown on an LCD attached to the gun holsters. There are two difficulty options, "Regular" and "Pro".

== Development and release ==
Development of Shoot Away was done by Sho Osugi, an engineer for Namco that worked on many of the company's driving games for arcades. He was assisted by Kazunori Sawano, best known for his work on Namco's first major hit Galaxian. Shoot Away was one of Namco's first products exported outside Japan, helping establish intercontinental connections with other manufacturers.

== Reception ==
Shoot Away was one of Namco's first major arcade hits, and performed considerably well in the United States. Satish Bhutani, the co-founder of Namco America, had difficulty in satisfying the growing demand for the game. Shoot Away remained a popular title in arcades well after its original release, with machines still being sold as late as 1986.

In Japan, Shoot Away was the third highest-earning EM arcade game of 1977, and the sixth highest overall arcade game that year. The following year, it was the second highest-earning EM arcade game of 1978 (below Namco's F-1), and the eighth highest overall arcade game. It was later one of the highest-earning EM arcade games of 1980 and Namco's fifth highest arcade game that year (below Pac-Man, Galaxian, Rally-X and Pitch In).

Cash Box was enamored with the game's sense of realism, particularly its rifle-shaped lightguns and illuminated projector backdrop. They wrote that it provides "a very appealing atmosphere for the player". Electronic Fun with Computer & Games shared their admiration for its large, vibrant projector screen. In a 1991 retrospective article on electro-mechanical arcade games, CU Amiga writer Julian Rignall ranked Shoot Away as one of the "real interactive games".

== Legacy ==
In 1978, Namco released a single-player version of Shoot Away named Clay Champ. It was designed to be smaller and more compact for arcades and other street locations, and used mirror effects combined with projection systems. Allied Leisure released the game in North America in June 1979. In the same year, Allied released a video version titled Clay Shoot. Namco released CosmoSwat in 1984, which was a reskin of Shoot Away that featured a science fiction-motif and a video display on the gun holster stand.

The arcade game appears in the 1984 film, The Karate Kid, where Ali Mills and her friends play the game at an arcade.

A 1992 sequel, Shoot Away II, was published in Japan, featuring additional difficulties and new fiber optic lightguns. A version that featured rapid-fire lightguns was also produced. Shoot Away II is included as a minigame in Time Crisis II (2001) and Point Blank DS (2006). Namco released a version of Shoot Away for Japanese cellular phones in 2002 through the i-Mode network. A third sequel, Shoot Away Pro, was developed by Bandai Namco Amusement and released in March 2018.
