= Dogfight (1980 video game) =

1980 video game

- Developer: Bill Basham
- Publisher: Micro Lab
- Platform: Apple II
- Release: 1980
- Genre: Multidirectional shooter
- Modes: Single-player, 2-8 players multiplayer

Dogfight is an aerial combat video game written by Bill Basham for the Apple II and published by Micro Lab in 1980. The game is a clone of Atari, Inc.'s 1975 arcade game Jet Fighter.

== Gameplay ==
The player controls an aircraft that always moves in the direction is it pointed and can be rotated left or right and shoot. The screen wraps around at the edges, such that a player heading off the right edge of the screen will re-enter from the left.

Players can play solo against the computer or up to 8 humans can play against each other. Since all input is via the single built-in keyboard of the Apple II, this involves the players crowding up against each other to reach their 3 keys. Each plane is identified by a number drawn next to it.

When a plane is shot, it becomes a parachuting figure, which transits the screen from top to bottom a few times and also may be shot.

== Development ==
The game was written by Bill Basham in Rockford, Illinois. He began programming the Apple II in machine language and wanted to explore animation. He was able to smoothly animate up to 56 items on the screen at the same time, optimized with a lookup table.

== Reception ==
Dogfight was number 6 on Softalk's "The Top Thirty" list in the February 1981 issue.

== Legacy ==
Programmer Bill Basham: "After writing Dogfight and publishing it through Microlab, I went on to write Diversi-DOS. Microlab wasn't selling Dogfight by then, so I decided to include it as a freebee with Diversi-DOS".

Dogfight II is a 1981 update with support for the Joyport device and two new game modes: multiplayer and anti-aircraft gunner.
