= Shark Jaws =

1975 video game

- Arcade flyer
- Developer: Horror Games (Atari, Inc.)
- Platform: Arcade
- Release: NA: September 25, 1975
- Genre: Action
- Mode: Single-player

Shark Jaws is an action video game by Atari, Inc. under the name of Horror Games, originally released for arcades in 1975. An unlicensed tie-in to the movie Jaws, and believed to be the first commercially released movie tie-in, it was created to be a game about sharks eating people. According to Bushnell, the game was successful enough to sell approximately two thousand units.

In the game, the player controls a deep-sea diver trying to catch small fish while avoiding a great white shark that is trying to eat him. Points are scored by running over the fish to catch them.

== Development ==
Atari head Nolan Bushnell originally tried to license the Jaws name, but was unable to secure a license from Universal Pictures. Deciding to go ahead with the game anyway, it was retitled Shark JAWS, with the word Shark in tiny print and JAWS in large all caps print to create greater prominence. Afraid of legal action from Universal, Atari released it under a fake name, Horror Games.

== Gameplay ==
Player has to dodge a shark while collecting fish for points, all while avoiding getting eaten by the shark.The number of fish collected is the score for the game and is shown on the top middle of the screen.

== Technology ==
The game is housed in a custom cabinet that includes a single joystick and start button. The cabinet bezel uses blue and green colors, and portrays sharks swimming around along with a solitary swimmer. The game PCB is composed of discrete technology, and although the game was released under the name Horror Games, the PCB clearly states Atari.
