= Tank (video game) =

1974 arcade game

- Promotional flyer showing the original cabinet
- Developer: Kee Games
- Publishers: NA: Kee Games; JP: Namco
- Designers: Steve Bristow; Lyle Rains
- Platform: Arcade
- Release: NA: November 1974; JP: September 1975
- Genres: Maze
- Mode: Multiplayer

Tank is an arcade game developed by Kee Games, a subsidiary of Atari, and released in November 1974. It was one of the few original titles not based on an existing Atari property developed by Kee Games, which was founded to sell clones of Atari games to distributors as a fake competitor prior to the merger of the two companies. In the game, two players drive tanks through a maze viewed from above while attempting to shoot each other and avoid mines, represented by X marks, in a central minefield. Each player controls their tank with a pair of joysticks, moving them forwards and back to drive, reverse, and steer, and firing shells with a button to attempt to destroy the other tank. The destruction of a tank from a mine or shell earns the opposing player a point, and tanks reappear after being destroyed. The winner is the player with more points when time runs out, with each game typically one or two minutes long.

Tank was designed by Steve Bristow, who had previously worked with the founders of Atari on Computer Space, the first arcade video game, and was developed by Lyle Rains. It was created as part of Bristow's vision to move the company away from only producing copies of Atari's games into also developing original titles. The game's cabinet was designed by Peter Takaichi. In September 1974, during development, Atari merged with Kee. The game was commercially successful, selling over 10,000 units and buoying Atari's then-troubled finances. It led to a cocktail cabinet release of the game and to three sequels: Tank II (1975), Tank 8 (1976), and Ultra Tank (1978). A dedicated console version of Tank II was announced in 1977 but cancelled later that year; the joysticks for the game, however, became the standard joystick controllers for the Atari 2600 (1977). Variations on the game were included in the Atari 2600 game Combat, as well as in the Coleco Telstar game Telstar Combat!, both in 1977.

== Gameplay ==
Tank is a two-player maze game in which the players, each controlling a tank, attempt to shoot each other. The maze is a set of blocks set at right angles to each other with an empty square central area all viewed from above; the shape of the maze is not symmetric, and is the same between games. One of the tank sprites is white and the other is black, while the central area is filled with black X marks representing land mines. The tanks can fire shells, which destroy the other tank if they hit; tanks are also destroyed if they hit a land mine. The destruction of a tank grants the opposing player a point and causes a brief explosion and accompanying sound, during which time the other tank cannot shoot, before restoring the tank at the same position. Destroyed land mines do not return. Points are displayed above the play area, and flash during the final twenty seconds of the round. The game continues until the time runs out, after which the player with the higher point value wins the match. Each game typically costs a quarter and lasts for 60 seconds, but an internal toggle adjusts it to two quarters and 120 seconds. The time can be further adjusted by operators.

The game is displayed on a black-and-white television screen, and the tanks are controlled by two joysticks each. Pushing both joysticks moves the player's tank forward, and pulling them both back causes the tank to stop. Pulling them in different directions or amounts causes the tank to turn in place or while moving, respectively. A button on the top of the right joystick fires a shell.

== Development ==
Photo of gameplay; the two tanks are at the bottom and neither player has scored.

The arcade game market is split into manufacturers, distributors, and operators; manufacturers like Atari sell game machines to distributors—who handle several types of electronic machines—who in turn sell them to the operators of locations. In the early 1970s, distributors bought games on an exclusive basis, meaning that only one distributor in each distribution region would carry products from a given arcade game manufacturer, restricting the manufacturer to only the operators that distributor sold to. Atari, in 1973 just over a year old and largely based on their hit first game Pong, felt that as a smaller manufacturer this setup severely limited their ability to sell arcade games: they could only contract with a limited number of distributors, who would only buy a limited number of games per year. To work around this, Atari set up a secret subsidiary company in September 1973, Kee Games, which was intended to sell clones of Atari's games, in effect doubling their potential reach. Kee did have its own manufacturing equipment and therefore the ability to develop original titles, and after several clone games lead engineer Steve Bristow developed the idea for a new title. Bristow, who had previously worked with the Atari founders on Computer Space, the first arcade video game, came up with the idea while thinking of how he could improve Computer Space. His idea to correct the perceived shortcomings of the game were to replace its difficult to control rocket ships with more straightforward tanks, and to make it a two-player game instead of a single-player one.

As the company's only engineer, Bristow rapidly developed a prototype himself before turning the game over to new hire Lyle Rains to develop into a finished product, codenamed K2 Tank. Rains added the maze and central minefield to the game design and developed the final hardware, including the simple control scheme. Peter Takaichi designed a large custom cabinet to house it. Tank was one of the first games to use integrated circuit-based memory—specifically, mask ROM (read-only memory)—to store graphical data, rather than the diode arrays that previous arcade games used; it is sometimes claimed in sources to be the very first, but was preceded at minimum by Atari's Gran Trak 10 (1974). Integrated circuit-based memory thereafter became the standard for arcade and console video games. Before the game could be completed, Kee Games was merged into Atari in September 1974; Tank was released that November.

== Reception and legacy ==
Tank was a commercial success and is credited with buoying the finances of the newly merged Atari at a critical time for the company. Atari produced a second version of the game, a cocktail cabinet form in which the two players sat across a circular table from each other. Tank sold over 10,000 units, considered a large hit at the time, though Ralph H. Baer claims that was only the 1974 sales, with a further 5,000 sold in 1975. This would make Tank the best-selling arcade video game of 1974 in the United States as well as the second best-selling title of 1975 in America (below Wheels), according to Baer.

A sequel, Tank II, was released in 1975 to sales of around 1,000 units; gameplay was identical, though the maze could be changed to a new format by modifying the circuitry and more sound effects were added. In March 1976, RePlay magazine published a survey of the top 20 arcade games in use, and listed Tank and Tank II together as the highest-earning game in the prior year in the United States. Tank II was later the 15th highest-grossing arcade game of 1977 in the United States according to Play Meter (or 14th highest video game, excluding the electro-mechanical game F-1). It was followed by two further sequels: the color Tank 8 in 1976, which featured eight tanks and players simultaneously; and Ultra Tank in 1978, which reverted to a two-player black and white game with the ability to select multiple different maze types and have invisible tanks.

A dedicated console version of Tank II was announced by Atari at the Consumer Electronics Show in 1977, but was cancelled by the end of the year; the joysticks for the game, designed by Kevin McKinsey, became the standard joystick controllers for the Atari 2600 (1977). The Atari 2600 game Combat, released in 1977, includes several variations of Tank, including ones with bouncing shots or invisible tanks. Combat was initially developed as a console version of the arcade game, like the cancelled dedicated console version, with additional plane-based game modes added during development. Despite Atari's cancellation of the dedicated console version of Tank, a dedicated console game inspired by Tank was still released in 1977 by Coleco: the Telstar game Telstar Combat! plays four variations of Tank, and was released prior to the Atari 2600 and Combat.

The success of Tank, along with 1975 title Western Gun (Gun Fight), led to the popularization of one-on-one dueling video games. The 1980 arcade first-person shooter game Battlezone (1980) was primarily inspired by Tank. According to Battlezone designer Ed Rotberg, his concept was to update Tank with the advent of vector graphics in the arcades.

== Sources ==
- Akagi, Masumi (2006-10-13). アーケードTVゲームリスト 国内•海外編 (1971-2005) [Arcade TV Game List: Domestic • Overseas Edition (1971-2005)] (in Japanese). Amusement News Agency. ISBN 978-4-9902512-1-5.
- Baer, Ralph H. (2005). Videogames: In the Beginning. Rolenta Press. ISBN 978-0-9643848-1-1.
- Bogost, Ian; Montfort, Nick (2009-03-31). Racing the Beam. MIT Press. ISBN 978-0-262-01257-7.
- Fox, Matt (2013-01-03). The Video Game Guide: 1,000+ Arcade, Console and Computer Games, 1962-2012 (2nd ed.). McFarland & Company. ISBN 978-0-7864-7257-4.
- Lapetino, Tim (2016-10-26). Art of Atari. Dynamite Entertainment. ISBN 978-1-5241-0106-0.
- Goldberg, Marty; Vendel, Curt (2012-11-25). Atari Inc.: Business Is Fun. Syzygy Press. ISBN 978-0-9855974-0-5. Archived from the original on 2020-01-11.
- Smith, Alexander (2019-11-19). They Create Worlds: The Story of the People and Companies That Shaped the Video Game Industry, Vol. I: 1971-1982. CRC Press. ISBN 978-0-429-75261-2.
- Wolf, Mark J. P. (2007-11-30). The Video Game Explosion: A History from PONG to PlayStation and Beyond. Greenwood Publishing Group. ISBN 978-0-313-33868-7.
- Wolf, Mark J. P. (2012-08-09). "BattleZone and the Origins of First-Person Shooting Games". In Call, Joshua; Voorhees, Gerald A.; Whitlock, Katie (eds.). Guns, Grenades, and Grunts: First-Person Shooter Games. Bloomsbury Academic. ISBN 978-1-4411-4224-5.
