= Jet Fighter (video game) =

1975 video game

- North American arcade flyer
- Developer: Atari, Inc.
- Publishers: NA/EU: Atari, Inc.; JP: Namco
- Platform: Arcade
- Release: NA: October 1975; EU: 1975; JP: December 1975
- Genre: Shoot 'em up
- Modes: Single-player, multiplayer

Jet Fighter is a shooter video game released for arcades in 1975 by Atari, Inc. under both the Atari and Kee Games brands. It was distributed in Japan by Nakamura Seisakusho (Namco).

== Technology ==
The game is housed in a custom cabinet that includes two 8-way joysticks (one per player) meant to look like older style flight sticks. Each stick has a fire button mounted on the top.

== Gameplay ==
The players fly in simulated jets around the screen, engaging in a dogfight and attempting to score hits on their opponent within a limited amount of time. When a player is hit, their plane spins around and an explosion is heard. After a few seconds, the plane recovers, pointing at a random direction.

== Legacy ==
- A home console port was included in the Atari 2600 game cartridge Combat.
- Dogfight by Microlab for Apple II.
