= Hi-way =

1975 video game

- Arcade flyer
- Developer: Atari, Inc.
- Publishers: Atari, Inc.
- Platform: Arcade
- Release: NA: April 1975; EU: 1975
- Genre: Racing
- Mode: Single-player

Hi-way, also known as Highway, is a 1975 racing video game developed and published by Atari Inc. for arcades. Marketed with the slogan "Hi Way — All It Needs Is Wheels", it was Atari's first game to use a sit-down arcade cabinet.

== Gameplay ==
This is a game where the player dodges cars on both sides of a narrow two-lane road. For every car successfully passed, one point is awarded. If the player hit a car on the road, the player loses all momentum and does not gain any points. Contrary to previous driving games where the player stood in front of the steering wheel, the player is seated. The game ends when time runs out.

== Technology ==
The game hardware is a pre-microprocessor discrete transistor-transistor logic (TTL) design, and used the Durastress process. The cabinet was patented Oct. 20, 1975: (U.S. Patent # D243,626).

The game uses vertical scrolling, influenced by Taito's Speed Race (1974), which was released by Midway Manufacturing as Racer in North America. Hi-way is also the first racing video game to use a sit-down cabinet similar to older electro-mechanical games. The same cabinet design would be used the next year with Atari's popular driving game Night Driver (1976).
