= LeMans (video game) =

1976 arcade game

- Arcade flyer
- Developer(s): Atari, Inc.
- Publisher(s): NA: Atari; JP: Namco
- Platform(s): Arcade
- Release: NA: August 1976; JP: October 1976
- Genre(s): Racing

LeMans is a single-player race game created by Atari, Inc. in 1976. It was distributed in Japan by Namco. It is the successor to the Gran Trak 10 and Gran Track 20 video games.

== Gameplay ==
LeMans is a single-player racing video game in which the player drives along a race track shown in top-down view. The player controls the car using a steering wheel, accelerator and brake pedals, and a four-position gear stick. The objective is to drive against a time limit around a series of race tracks, while avoiding oil slicks and the walls. There are six tracks based on real world race tracks (Le Mans, Nürburgring, Sebring, Laguna Seca, Silverstone and Daytona) and four "mystery tracks", two of which will be chosen at random if the player manages to complete the first six tracks within the time limit.

== Reception ==
In the United States, it was listed by Play Meter as the fourth highest-grossing arcade game of 1977, and by RePlay as one of the year's top 35 arcade games. It was later among America's top 30 highest-grossing arcade video games of 1979, according to Play Meter.

LeMans was a commercial success for Namco in Japan. On the first annual Game Machine arcade chart, Breakout was the sixth highest-grossing arcade video game of 1976 in Japan. It was the third highest arcade racing game on the list, below Namco's electro-mechanical game F-1 and Taito's video game Speed Race DX (Wheels).
