= Quiz Show (video game) =

1976 video game

- Arcade flyer
- Developer(s): Kee Games
- Publisher(s): Kee Games
- Platform(s): Arcade
- Release: NA: April 1976
- Genre(s): Quiz
- Mode(s): Single-player, multiplayer

Quiz Show (onscreen title: "The Kee Games Quiz Show") is a two-player arcade video game by Kee Games, a company originally established by Atari, Inc. The game was originally released in 1976. A computerized version of a quiz show, the game presents multiple choice answers to questions from a range of categories.

== Gameplay ==
The game asks the player questions, with the player pressing the corresponding button to answer. Questions are multiple choice, chosen from a pool of 1000 questions in four categories: people, sports, movie, and potpourri. Categories are chosen prior to the game's start. Points are awarded for a correct answer, with point deductions for incorrect answers. Bonus points are also awarded, and are based on the length of time it takes to answer the question. At the end of game play, the player is given a rating of Dunce, Lucky, Smart, or Genius based on their score.

== Technology ==
The game is housed in a custom cabinet that includes two sets (one set per player) of four buttons on each side of the monitor. The game PCB uses a Signetics 2650 CPU, with all questions and answers stored on a removable 8-track audio cassette tape that is streamed to the game.

Quiz Show is believed to be the first game to utilize the now well-known "arcade font". The 8×8 monospaced typeface was later used in Sprint 2, as well as in many arcade games by other manufacturers.
