= Submarine (arcade game) =

1978 electro-mechanical arcade game

- Japanese promotional flyer.
- Developer: Namco
- Publishers: JP: Namco; NA: Midway Manufacturing
- Designer: Akira Osugi
- Platform: Arcade
- Release: JP: 1978; NA: September 1979
- Genre: Shooter
- Modes: Single-player, multiplayer

Submarine (Note: Japanese: サブマリン, Hepburn: Sabumarin) is an electro-mechanical arcade game that was released by Namco in 1978, and was licensed to Midway for US manufacturing and distribution in September 1979.

== Gameplay ==
The player uses the yellow periscope to aim at the moving submarines on the screen. Pressing the button on the right handle will fire a torpedo, and the goal is to shoot down all of the submarines in the fastest amount of time. The further the submarine is, the more points the player will receive, with green being the closest, and red being the furthest. The game ends when the timer on the cabinet reaches zero.

== Reception and legacy ==
The November 11, 1978 issue of Cashbox called it ""one of the most realistic" games of its kind "ever put into a cabinet". The December 30 issue noted the game's realistic design and gameplay features.

In 1999, Namco demonstrated a sequel to Submarine, titled Submarines (Note: Japanese: サブマリンズ, Hepburn: Sabumarinzu), at the Amusement Machine Operator's Union (AMOU) tradeshow in Tokyo. It was a video game which used a goggle-like controller that the player moved around to aim and fire, and also featured periscope-like stereo speakers. Submarines was designed to take full advantage of Namco's engineering technology, and was well-received by the press. Despite its praise, the game was never released.
