= 1978 in video games =

1978 saw the release of new video games such as Space Invaders. The year is considered the beginning of the golden age of arcade video games. The year's highest-grossing video game was Taito's arcade game Space Invaders, while the best-selling home system was the Atari Video Computer System (Atari VCS).

== Financial performance ==
=== Highest-grossing arcade games ===
Space Invaders was the top-grossing video game worldwide in 1978. The following table lists the top-grossing arcade games of 1978 in Japan, the United Kingdom, United States, and worldwide.

| Market | Title | Gross revenue | Inflation | Cabinet sales | Developer | Distributor | Genre | Ref |
|---|---|---|---|---|---|---|---|---|
| Japan | Space Invaders | $670,000,000 | $3,300,000,000 | 100,000 | Taito | Taito | Shoot 'em up | |
| United Kingdom | Space Invaders | Unknown | Unknown | Unknown (Note: Space Invaders sold 85,000 cabinets in the United Kingdom between 1978 and 1979.) | Taito | Midway Manufacturing | Shoot 'em up | |
| United States | Space Wars | Unknown | Unknown | 10,000 | Cinematronics | Cinematronics | Shooter | |
| Worldwide | Space Invaders | | | | Taito | | Shoot 'em up | |

==== Japan ====
In Japan, the following titles were the highest-grossing arcade games of 1978, according to the third annual Game Machine chart, which lists both arcade video games and electro-mechanical games (EM games) on the same arcade game chart. Taito's Space Invaders was the first video game to become highest-grossing overall arcade game on the annual Game Machine charts, after the two previous charts were topped by an EM game, F-1 by Namco.

| Arcade video games | | | | | | Arcade electro-mechanical games (EM games) | | | | | |
| Rank | Title | #1 | #2 | #3 | Points | Rank | Title | #1 | #2 | #3 | Points |
|---|---|---|---|---|---|---|---|---|---|---|---|
| 1 | Space Invaders | 48 | 7 | 4 | 162 | 1 | F-1 | 2 | 4 | 0 | 14 |
| 2 | Super Speed Race V | 1 | 18 | 8 | 47 | 2 | Shoot Away | 0 | 2 | 7 | 11 |
| 3 | Block Kakuhi (Note: ブロック 各被, Burokku Kakuhi) | 4 | 9 | 8 | 38 | 3 | Flipper (Pinball) (Note: フリッパー, Furippā) | 1 | 3 | 1 | 10 |
| 4 | Scratch | 3 | 4 | 5 | 22 | 4 | Mogura Taiji (Whac-A-Mole) | 1 | 2 | 2 | 9 |
| 5 | Speed Race DX | 3 | 4 | 3 | 20 | 5 | Submarine | 0 | 3 | 2 | 8 |
| 6 | Cosmic Monsters | 2 | 3 | 0 | 14 | 6 | Magnetic Crane (Note: 各磁 クレーン) | 1 | 1 | 1 | 6 |
| 7 | Acrobat | 1 | 2 | 2 | 9 | 7 | Pai Pai 45 (Note: パイパイ 45, Paipai 45) | 0 | 1 | 1 | 3 |
| 8 | Gee Bee | 1 | 1 | 3 | 8 | 8 | Bank Robbers (Note: バンクロバーズ, Banku Robāzu) (Kasco) (Note: 湘阿織機, Kansai Seiki) | 1 | 0 | 0 | 3 |
| 9 | Super Breakout | 0 | 2 | 2 | 6 | 9 | Clay Champ | 0 | 0 | 2 | 2 |
| 10 | Castle Take (Note: キャッスルテイク, Kyassuru Teiku) (Sankyo) | 0 | 1 | 2 | 4 | 9 | Oni Nakase (Note: 鬼泣かせ) | 0 | 1 | 0 | 2 |

The following titles were the highest-grossing games on each Game Machine arcade chart. Nintendo's EVR Race was the highest-grossing medal game for the third year in a row.

| Chart | Top title | Gross revenue | Inflation | Cabinet sales | Manufacturer | Genre | Ref |
|---|---|---|---|---|---|---|---|
| Arcade game | Space Invaders | $670,000,000 | $3,300,000,000 | 100,000 | Taito | Shoot 'em up | |
| Medal game | EVR Race | Unknown | Unknown | Unknown | Nintendo | Racing | |

==== United States ====
In the United States, the following titles were the top ten highest-grossing arcade video games of 1978, in terms of coin drop earnings according to the annual Play Meter and RePlay charts.

| Rank | Play Meter | RePlay | Cabinet sales |
|---|---|---|---|
| 1 | Space Wars | | 10,000 |
| 2 | Sprint 2 | | Unknown |
| 3 | Sea Wolf | Sprint 1 | Unknown |
| 4 | Sea Wolf II | Sea Wolf | Unknown |
| 5 | Super Bug | Breakout | Unknown |
| 6 | Starship 1 | Super Bug | Unknown |
| 7 | Circus | Starship 1 | Unknown |
| 8 | Breakout | Sea Wolf II | Unknown |
| 9 | Night Driver | Smokey Joe | Unknown |
| 10 | Sprint 1 | LeMans | Unknown |

=== Best-selling home systems ===
| Rank | System(s) | Manufacturer(s) | Type | Generation | Sales | Ref |
|---|---|---|---|---|---|---|
| 1 | Atari Video Computer System (Atari VCS) | Atari, Inc. | Console | Second | 300,000 | |
| 1 | Bandai Baseball | Bandai | Handheld | —N/a | 300,000 | |
| 3 | TRS-80 | Tandy Corporation | Computer | 8-bit | 150,000 | |
| 4 | Commodore PET | Commodore International | Computer | 8-bit | 30,000 | |
| 5 | Apple II | Apple Inc. | Computer | 8-bit | 20,000 | |
| 6 | IMSAI 8080 | IMS Associates, Inc. | Computer | 8-bit | 5,000 | |
| 6 | IBM 5110 | IBM | Computer | —N/a | 5,000 | |
| 8 | Altair 8800 | MITS | Computer | 8-bit | 4,000 | |
| 8 | HP 9800 series | Hewlett-Packard | Computer | —N/a | 4,000 | |
| 10 | Pertec/MITS 300 | Pertec Computer | Computer | 8-bit | 3,000 | |

== Events ==
- Consumer-oriented video game journalism begins with the golden age of arcade video games, soon after the success of Space Invaders, leading to hundreds of favourable articles and stories about the emerging video game medium being aired on television and printed in newspapers and magazines.
- In North America, the first regular consumer-oriented column about video games, "Arcade Alley" in Video magazine, is penned by Bill Kunkel, Arnie Katz, and Joyce Worley.

== Business ==
- New companies: Automated Simulations (later Epyx), Koei, Muse Software, SNK, Supersoft, Synergistic, U.S. Games.
- The American arcade game market earns a revenue of $1 billion (equivalent to $4.94 billion in 2025).
- The American home video game market is worth $200 million.

== Notable releases ==
=== Games ===
Arcade

- June – Taito releases Space Invaders in Japan. The worldwide success of Space Invaders marks the beginning of the golden age of arcade video games. It sets the template for the fixed shooter genre and influences most subsequent shooters.
- October – Midway gives Space Invaders a wide release in North America.
- October – Namco releases their first arcade video game, Gee Bee, in Japan.
- Atari, Inc. popularizes the trackball controller with Football.
- Atari, Inc. releases Super Breakout, the multi-directionall scrolling game Fire Truck, Canyon Bomber, and Avalanche. Avalanche later inspires Activision's Kaboom!
- Konami Corporation releases their first arcade video game, Block Yard.
- Nintendo releases their first arcade video game, Computer Othello.

Computer

- The book BASIC Computer Games, microcomputer edition, is released.

=== Hardware ===
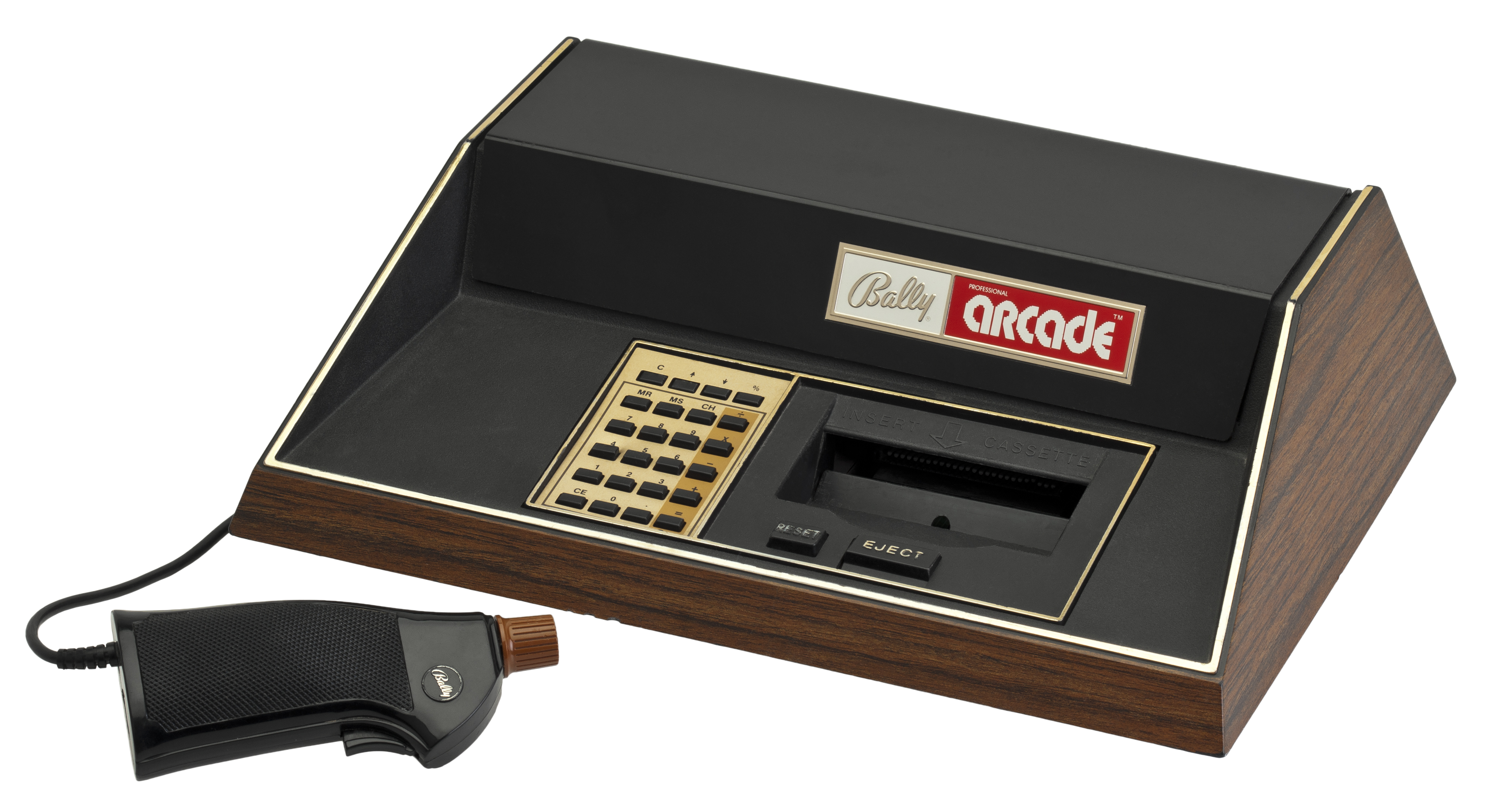
Bally Astrocade

Computer

- Elektor releases the TV Games Computer.

Console

- December – Magnavox launches the Odyssey².
- APF Electronics releases the APF-M1000.
- Bally/Midway releases the Bally Professional Arcade.
- Entreprex releases the Apollo 2001.
- Interton releases the VC 4000.

== See also ==
- 1978 in games
