= Indy 4 (video game) =

1976 video game

- Arcade flyer
- Developer: Kee Games
- Publisher: Kee Games
- Platform: Arcade
- Release: NA: May 1976; JP: 1976
- Genre: Racing
- Mode: Multiplayer

Indy 4 is a 1976 racing video game developed and published by Kee Games (a subsidiary of Atari, Inc.) for arcades. It is a 4-player game that was preceded by its larger 8-player counterpart, Indy 800, in 1975.

== Technology ==
The game is housed in a large custom square cabinet with two steering wheels and four pedals on each side. The monitor sits in the top of the cabinet. The game uses a full-color RGB display and does not use color overlays.

The cabinet also features overhead mirrors to allow spectators to watch the game while it's being played.

== Gameplay ==
Gameplay is a simulation of an Indianapolis 500 style of race, in which players compete by racing each other with simulated IndyCar race cars. The player cars' colors are light blue, green, red, and dark blue.
