= Speed Race =

1974 video game

- Developer: Taito
- Publishers: JP/EU: Taito; NA: Midway Manufacturing; AU: Leisure & Allied Industries
- Designer: Tomohiro Nishikado
- Series: Speed Race
- Platform: Arcade
- Release: November 1974: Speed Race; JP: November 1974; EU/AU: Late 1974 Racer; NA: February 1975 Wheels; NA: March 1975 Speed Race DX; JP: August 1975 Wheels II; NA: August 1975 Speed Race Twin; JP: April 1976; EU: 1976
- Genre: Racing
- Modes: Single-player, multiplayer

Speed Race (Note: Japanese: スピードレース, Hepburn: Supīdo Rēsu) is a 1974 racing video game developed and published by Taito for arcades. It was released under the titles Racer and Wheels in North America by distributor Midway Manufacturing in 1975. Designed by Tomohiro Nishikado, the gameplay involves the player using the attached steering wheel to maneuver a car alongside a fast vertical scrolling road. The objective is to score points by driving past other cars without colliding with them; more points are awarded for driving faster. Players must do this under a 90-second time limit, which ends the game when it runs out. The gameplay concepts were adapted from two earlier driving electro-mechanical games: Kasco's Mini Drive (1958) and Taito's Super Road 7 (1970).

The original Speed Race and Wheels had an upright arcade cabinet, while Midway's Racer introduced a sit-down cabinet. Taito released an updated version of Speed Race called Speed Race DX in 1975. Two-player versions followed with Midway's Wheels II and Taito's Speed Race Twin.

The game was a worldwide commercial success. Speed Race was a hit in Japan, establishing 100 yen per play as the standard for arcade games there, while Wheels and Wheels II sold 10,000 arcade cabinets in the United States to become the best-selling arcade game of 1975. The Speed Race DX and Wheels versions were also among the top three highest-grossing arcade games of 1976 in Japan and the United States, respectively, while Speed Race DX was Japan's highest-grossing arcade video game of 1977. The game spawned the Speed Race series of arcade racing games. The game's use of vertical scrolling was also influential on later games.

== Gameplay ==
Speed Race is a one or two-player racing video game where players controls a race car along a constantly-scrolling vertical road. The player uses a steering wheel to move the car left or right and an accelerator to make it move faster. The objective of the game is to drive past other cars that scroll past the players under a 90-second time limit without colliding into them. The time limit and the player's score are displayed on an auxiliary LED display placed above the monitor. Points are earned by driving past cars, with additional points being awarded based on how fast the car is moving. Colliding with a car resets the player's speed and starts them at the beginning of the track. The game ends when the time limit runs out, though the timer can be extended by earning a certain number of points. Two difficulty modes are available that increase the speed of the cars and the number of cars on the track.

== Development ==
Following the release of Atari's Gran Trak 10 earlier in 1974, Taito employee Tomohiro Nishikado decided to develop his own racing video game the same year; he did not enjoy Gran Trak 10, due to its twisting tracks and complex controls. Nishikado looked to two older driving electro-mechanical games for inspiration: Kasco's Mini Drive (1958) and Taito's 1970 rear-projection driving game Super Road 7, the latter in turn similar to Kasco's Indy 500 (1968) and Chicago Coin's Speedway (1969). Mini Drive and Super Road 7 involved driving a car down an endlessly scrolling road, with Super Road 7 also having the need to dodge cars in front of the player. Nishikado adapted these gameplay concepts into a video game called Speed Race. In order to simulate the scrolling effect and give the illusion of a moving background, he animated a background road image and modulated the speed of oncoming computer-controlled cars based on the player's speed.

== Reception ==
In Japan, due to the complexity of the hardware, Taito released Speed Race at a price point of 100 yen per play, compared to the standard 50 yen per play up until then. Despite this, the game became a major hit in Japan, establishing 100 yen as the standard price point for arcade games in Japan over the next several decades. The updated versions Speed Race DX and Speed Race Twin were among the top ten highest-grossing arcade video games of 1976 in Japan, with Speed Race DX at number two (below Taito's Ball Park) and Speed Race Twin at number eight. Speed Race DX went on to be the highest-grossing arcade video game of 1977 in Japan, and second-highest-grossing overall arcade game below Namco's electro-mechanical F-1.

In North America, the game became a hit when it was released by Midway there in 1975. Wheels sold 7,000 arcade cabinets and Wheels II sold 3,000 for a combined 10,000 sold in the United States, making it the best-selling arcade game of 1975, according to sales figures provided by Ralph H. Baer. In March 1976, the first annual RePlay arcade chart listed Wheels and Wheels II as the second-highest-grossing arcade game of the previous year in the United States, in terms of coin drop earnings (below Atari's Tank and Tank II), while the Racer version was the year's eighth-highest-grossing arcade video game. In October, RePlay listed Wheels as the third-highest-grossing arcade video game of 1976 in the United States, below Sea Wolf and Gun Fight (both manufactured by Midway).

In Australia, Speed Race was also a major arcade hit. A significant number of arcade cabinets were sold in Australia.

== Legacy ==
The game's use of vertical scrolling was influential on later games. One of the games it influenced was Atari's Hi-way (1975), which added a sit-down cockpit cabinet like older electro-mechanical games.

=== Series ===
Speed Race spawned numerous updates, variations and sequels released by Taito and Midway in arcades.

Title	Manufacturer	Release date
Speed Race	Taito	November 1974
Racer	Midway	February 1975
Wheels	Midway	March 1975
Speed Race DX	Taito	August 1975
Wheels II	Midway	August 1975
Speed Race Twin	Taito	April 1976
Super Speed Race	Taito	December 1977
T.T. Speed Race	Taito	June 1978
Super Speed Race V	Taito	July 1978
T.T. Speed Race CL	Taito	October 1978
Speed Race CL-5	Taito	October 1978
Super Speed Race	Midway	November 1979
Super Speed Race GP V	Taito	December 1979
Super Speed Race Jr.	Taito	June 1985

In Japan, Super Speed Race was among the top ten highest-earning arcade video games of 1977. Speed Race Race V was the second highest-earning arcade video game of 1978, just below Taito's own shoot 'em up hit Space Invaders. Super Speed Race V and Speed Race CL-5 were the fifth and sixth highest-earning arcade games of 1979, respectively. Super Speed Race was then the ninth highest-earning arcade game of 1980.

Titus Software's Automobili Lamborghini (1997) for the Nintendo 64 was later re-branded Super Speed Race 64 for its Japanese release, which was published by Taito in May 1998.

== See also ==
- Color TV-Game Racing 112 (1978)
