= Kee Games =

American video game company

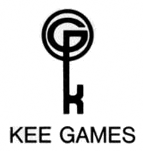
- Type: Subsidiary
- Industry: Video games
- Founded: 1973
- Defunct: 1978
- Headquarters: US
- Products: Arcade games
- Owner: Joe Keenan
- Parent: Atari, Inc.

Kee Games was an American video game company that released arcade and video games from 1973 to 1978. It was a subsidiary of Atari, Inc.

== History ==
Kee was formed by Joe Keenan, a friend and neighbor of Atari co-founder Nolan Bushnell, in September 1973. In reality, Bushnell had worked with Keenan to create Kee Games in response to the pinball and arcade distributors of the time who demanded exclusivity deals; Bushnell believed that Kee Games could offer similar but renamed arcade games, or "clones", to distributors, which would greatly expand Atari's distribution beyond the limits of these deals. Bushnell assigned several of Atari's staff to work at Kee Games, including Steve Bristow, Bill White, and Gil Williams, and discreetly supplied them the parts from which they could make their games. To the public, Kee Games advertised itself as a competitor to Atari and claimed that it was hiring defectors from Atari.

Through 1973 and 1974, Kee's games were slight modifications of Atari games already released or games that had been left in development at Atari. These included Elimination which was based on Bristow's Quadrapong that he had left unfinished at Atari, while Spike was based on Atari's Rebound but with an added move. Kee wanted to avoid the stigma of simply being a follower of Atari and started developing its own games, its first own game being Tank that was released in November 1974. Ahead of Tank's release, Atari itself was having financial and management problems. Among other measures, Atari opted to formally merge Kee Games into Atari in September 1974, with Keenan named to president of Atari and the Kee Games kept as a separate operating division. Tank became a popular arcade game, and helped Atari recover from the financial downturn. Kee continued to produce arcade games through 1978, when the division was closed down by Warner Communications, which had acquired Atari in 1976. After Bushnell left Atari in December 1978, Keenan departed the company a few months later, joining Bushnell to help manage his Pizza Time Theatre restaurant/arcade franchise.

== Games ==
- Elimination (October 1973) — cloned by Atari's Quadrapong
- Spike (March 1974) — a clone of Atari's Rebound, with an extra button labeled "spike"
- Formula K (April 1974) — a clone of Atari's Gran Trak 10
- Twin Racer (July 1974) — a clone of Atari's Gran Trak 20
- Tank (November 1974)
- Pursuit (January 1975)
- Indy 800 (April 1975)
- Tank II (May 1975) — the first game sold under the "Kee" label with the Atari disclosure
- Quiz Show (April 1976)
- Tank 8 (April 1976)
- Indy 4 (May 1976)
- Sprint 2 (November 1976)
- Drag Race (June 1977)
- Super Bug (September 1977)
- Sprint 1 (January 1978)
- Ultra Tank (February 1978)

== Sources ==
- Arcade history in 1974
- Atari Rising
