= Gun Fight =

1975 video game

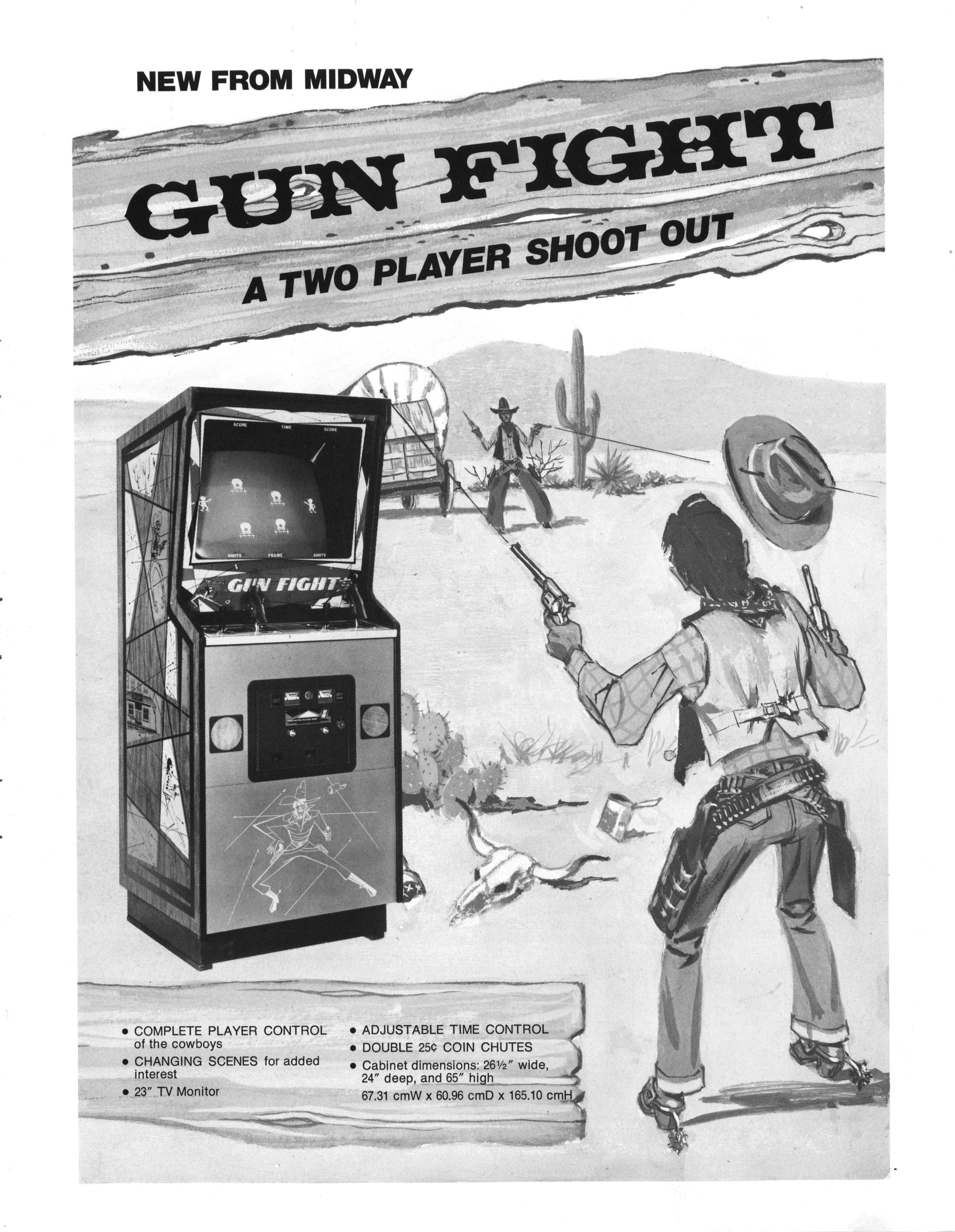
- North American print ad
- Developer: Taito
- Publishers: JP/EU: Taito; NA: Midway Manufacturing
- Designers: Tomohiro Nishikado; Dave Nutting (US)
- Programmer: Tom McHugh (US)
- Platforms: Arcade, Astrocade, Atari 8-bit
- Release: Arcade: JP: September 1975; NA: November 1975; EU: 1975; Astrocade: NA: 1977; Atari 8-bit: NA: 1984
- Genre: Multidirectional shooter
- Mode: Multiplayer
- Arcade system: Taito Discrete Logic; Midway 8080 (US)

Gun Fight is a 1975 multidirectional shooter arcade video game released by Midway in North America. It is based on Western Gun, (Note: Japanese: ウエスタンガン, Hepburn: Uesutan Gan) designed by Tomohiro Nishikado and released by Taito in Japan and Europe. Based around two Old West cowboys armed with revolvers and squaring off in a duel, it was the first video game to depict human-to-human combat. The Midway version was also the first video game to use a microprocessor instead of TTL. The game's concept was adapted from Sega's 1969 arcade electro-mechanical game Gun Fight.

The game was a global commercial success. In Japan, Western Gun was among the top ten highest-grossing arcade video games of 1976. In the United States, Gun Fight sold 8,600 arcade cabinets and was the third highest-grossing arcade game of 1975, second highest-grossing arcade game of 1976 and fifth highest arcade game of 1977.

It was ported to the Bally Astrocade video game console as a built-in game in 1977 and later the Atari 8-bit computers.

== Gameplay ==
Western Gun is a single-screen shooter where two players compete in an Old West gun fight. It was the first video game to depict human-to-human combat. When shot, the characters fall to the ground and the words "GOT ME!" appear above the body. The game has two joysticks per player: an eight-way joystick for moving the computerized cowboy and the other for changing the shooting direction. Unlike later dual stick games, Western Gun has the movement joystick on the right.

Obstacles between the characters block shots, such as a cactus, and (in later levels) stagecoaches. The guns have limited ammunition, with each player given six bullets. A round ends if both players run out of ammo. Gunshots can ricochet off the top and bottom edges of the playfield, allowing for indirect hits.

Taito's original Western Gun allows the two players to move around anywhere on the screen. Midway's version, Gun Fight, restricts each player to their respective portions of the screen and also increased the size of the characters.

== Development ==
=== Western Gun ===
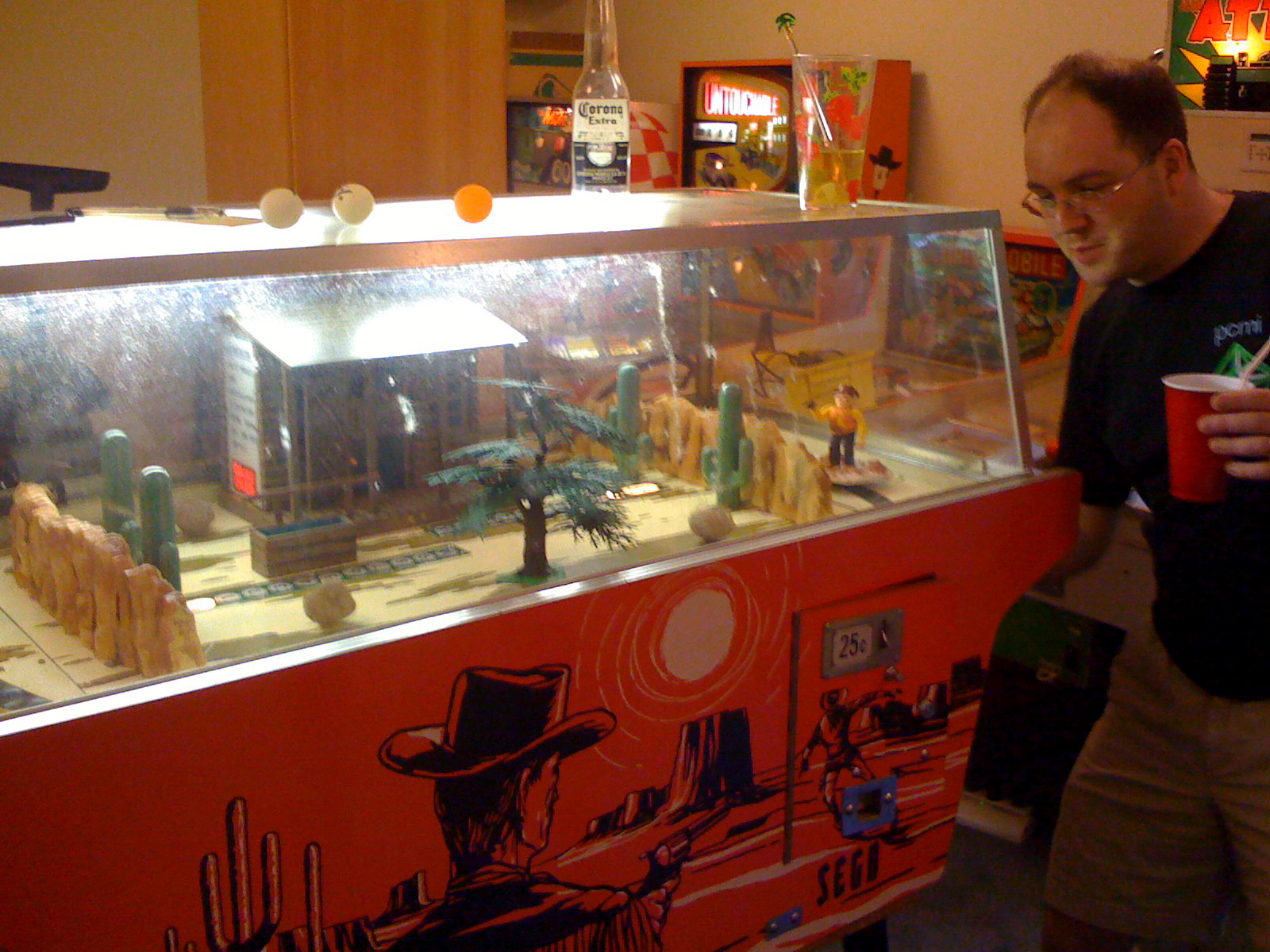
The electro-mechanical Gun Fight from Sega

Western Gun was developed by Tomohiro Nishikado for Taito Corporation. He based the gameplay off of the electro-mechanical game Gun Fight (1969) released by Sega. Gun Fight featured two cowboys on a movable track behind rock walls were separated by a field of objects like cacti, trees, and a saloon. If the players shot the cacti, the top would temporarily fall over, as would the cowboy if struck. Points were accumulated by shooting an opponent as many times as possible within the allotted timeframe. Nishikado adapted the mechanics of the original game and added rocks that bullets could ricochet off. Cacti in the environment would be partially destroyed when shot.

Having previously explored creating representational humanoids with the game TV Basketball (1974), Nishikado pushed the bar further by creating two articulated characters who could wander the screen as well as move their arms to aim the gun. The game was developed using transistor–transistor logic (TTL), as game development had not yet moved to microprocessors. The game was among the most complex TTL games developed in the 1970s.

The game features two sets of controls – one joystick to move the character and fire the weapon and another for aiming the arm. The secondary joystick only allows for vertical movement, with direction being dependent on the movement of the character. Western Gun could be considered the first twin-stick shooter.

=== Gun Fight ===
A game of Gun Fight

Taito had previously made licensing deals with Midway Manufacturing to release their video games in the United States, including TV Basketball and Speed Race (1974) (renamed Wheels by Midway). Once Western Gun was in development, the game was shown to representatives of Midway. The executives were not impressed with the game's graphics, which they considered unappealing for North American audiences.

Dave Nutting Associates (DNA) was a coin-operated game development firm operated by Dave Nutting and Jeffery Fredriksen. Previously, DNA had tried to interest Midway's parent company Bally Manufacturing in a microprocessor-based pinball game. Though Bally did not accept this deal, DNA maintained a close relationship. Using the Intel 8080 microprocessor, Fredriksen developed hardware to power arcade video games. He pioneered the use of a cost-effective framebuffer, which enabled versatility to create any type of game they desired. The hardware included a special barrel shifter circuit built from discrete chips. The microprocessor used this to shift each pattern of picture bits to the proper horizontal bit offset, reading back each shifted byte and then writing it into the framebuffer. The 8080, like other microprocessors of its era, had shift instructions that could only shift by a single bit position. With the shifter circuit, the microprocessor could quickly shift a picture byte by several bit positions, giving it more time for other work.

Nutting and Fredriksen developed a basic demonstration of a baseball game and showcased it to Midway, who had created many pitch-and-bat electro-mechanical baseball games. Midway instead proposed that DNA should adapt Western Gun to their arcade hardware. To program this translation, Fredriksen recruited from his alma mater the University of Wisconsin-Milwaukee. The head of the Robotic and Artificial Intelligence Laboratory, Richard Northouse, agreed to have two of his students sent to DNA as a work-study. Thomas A. McHugh (1946–2020) and another programmer (later replaced by Jamie Fenton) were propositioned to work on Gun Fight. McHugh took the offer and served as the principle programmer under game designer David Nutting. The game was programmed in assembly language using an Intellec 8 microprocessor development system, with graphical elements translated from hexadecimal code.

DNA's version increased the size of the player characters, while at the same time restricting each character's movement on their respective halves of the screen. It also added limited shots, indicated by a set of bullets drawn graphically at the bottom of the screen. The game's cabinet featured a bezel which provided indications of score, game time, and bullets. The screen also featured an overlay which rendered the white graphical elements of the screen yellow. Controls were altered slightly from Western Gun, with a larger aiming stick featuring a wider range of movement rather than purely vertical.

Their version of the game eliminated the rock obstacles, added indestructible trees, and created a progression of stages after each round. More obstacles were added to the field as the scores got higher, introducing a moving stagecoach to serve as an additional impediment.

Midway's version was released as Gun Fight in November 1975.

== Reception ==
In Japan, Western Gun was among the top ten highest-rated arcade video games of 1976 by operators polled in the 1976 New Year's Holiday period.

Gun Fight sold 8,600 units in the United States, making it among the best selling video games of the time period and the top selling game released in 1975.

In March 1976, the first annual RePlay arcade chart listed Gun Fight as third best-charting video game among its polled operators. In October the same year, RePlay listed Gun Fight in second place, below Midway's Sea Wolf. In November 1977, the first annual Play Meter arcade chart listed Gun Fight as the fifth best-charting arcade video game of 1977. Play Meter later listed it among the top 30 top arcade games of 1978 among operators polled.

Tomohiro Nishikado believed that his original version was more fun than Midway's version, but he was impressed with the Midway machine's improved graphics and smoother animation. He was inspired to explore microprocessor-based hardware, which eventually resulted in Space Invaders (1978). The hardware of Space Invaders is incredibly similar to Gun Fight, including the use of the barrel shifter circuit. The hardware was also reused in subsequent Dave Nutting Associates-developed Midway games including Sea Wolf (1976) and 280 ZZZAP (1976). In Taito's Space Invaders Part II of 1979, this circuit was replaced by a Fujitsu MB14241, a single-chip implementation of the barrel shifter introduced in Gun Fight.

In 2021, The Guardian listed it as the eleventh greatest video game of the 1970s.

== Ports ==
When Dave Nutting Associates developed the Bally Professional Arcade console, they included a built-in version of Gun Fight in the system's ROM. This version was programmed by Alan McNeil, later of Berzerk fame.

In 1984, Epyx released Gun Fight bundled with another Midway game, Sea Wolf II, for Atari 8-bit computers as part of their Arcade Classics compilation.

== Legacy ==
Gun Fight was popular enough to spawn a sequel released in 1977, Boot Hill.

The game was included in GameSpy's "Hall of Fame" in 2002. They commented that "Gun Fight was the first game to feature two humanized characters attempting to outfight each other, which would become one of the most common themes in games for the next 25-plus years"; that it was one of the first Japanese video games imported to North America; and that Midway's version "was the first microprocessor-based arcade game".

David Crane developed the game Outlaw (1978), which was based on the Midway version of Gun Fight. Crane said the game was influenced by Gun Fight and liked the idea of making a game with two opposing gunfighters. Other companies had released similar games for their consoles during this period, such as Gunfighter for the RCA Studio II, and an official adaptation of Gun Fight was a built-in game on the Bally Professional Arcade.

In 1982, the clone Gunfight was released for the Atari 8-bit computers by Hofacker / Elcomp Publishing. The Duel for the Commodore 64 is a clone released in 1985.

Taito used a control scheme similar to Western Gun for the run and gun video game Front Line (1982). In 1995, GamesMaster host Dominik Diamond called Sega's arcade game Virtual On: Cyber Troopers "a futuristic version" of Gun Fight.

== See also ==
- Boot Hill (1977)
- Sheriff (1979)
