= 1974 in video games =

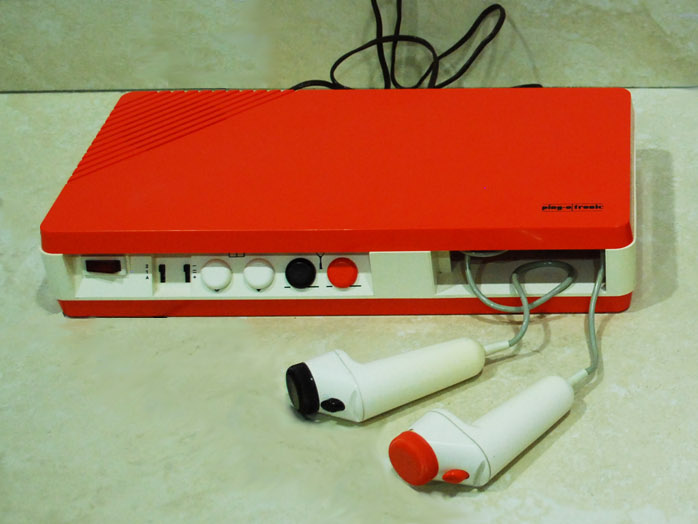
Zanussi Ping-O-Tronic console of 1974. Made in Italy

1974 saw the expansion of technology and public awareness of video games. A proliferation of companies creating commercial video games in the coin-operated amusement market attracted attention from the mainstream press. Coin-operated games began to diversify in content beyond Pong derivatives. The first three-dimensional games were developed for linked graphical terminals which were not widely commercialized. Some of the first efforts to create video game consoles after the release of Magnavox's Odyssey became available in the United States and Europe.

== Events ==
- January 31 – A fire destroys the factory of Allied Leisure in Hialeah, Florida. The company is forced to exit the video game industry temporarily.
- April 15 – Magnavox and Sanders Associates file suit against Atari Inc, Bally Mfg, Chicago Dynamic Industries, Allied Leisure, and Empire Distributing for infringement of the patents related to the Odyssey by Ralph Baer and Bill Rusch. Magnavox’s wave of litigation would be highly consequential to the development of the video game industry.
- June 21–23 – The program Ribbit from the University of Waterloo earns victory at the First Canadian Computer Chess Championship, running off of a Honeywell 6050. It later wins at the fifth U.S. American Computer Chess Championship, displacing the four time champion Chess 4.0.
- July – Nakamura Seisakusho (later Namco) purchases Atari Japan for 296 million yen. The company becomes the exclusive distributor of Atari video games in Japan for several years – solidifying a long-term relationship between Atari and Namco.
- August 5–8 – The first World Computer Chess Championship is held in Stockholm, Sweden. Kaissa, a program developed in the Soviet Union, earns first prize.
- August 27 – Sega sponsors a national tournament of competitive video games called the All Japan TV Game Championships at three hundred locations throughout Japan.
- September 15 – The New York Times runs an article covering the Pong boom titled “The Space Age Pinball Machine.”
- November 1–3 – The Music Operators of America show is held in Chicago, Illinois. Notable video games at the show include Qwak! by Atari, Tank by Kee Games, and Baseball by Ramtek.

== Financial performance ==
=== United States ===
==== Arcade ====
Total Video Game Cabinets: 40,000 units. (Note: The Frost & Sullivan estimate totals 30,000 games with traditional arcade cabinets and 10,000 for those under the new cocktail table presentation.)

Total Video Game Revenue (machine sales): $40.5 million. (Note: The Frost & Sullivan estimate totals $33 million in games with traditional arcade cabinets and $7.5 million for those with the new cocktail table presentation.)

Title	Arcade cabinet units (Lifetime)	Manufacturer	Developer	Genre
Tank	16,000 (Note: Ralph Baer's numbers compiled in April 1976 are mostly estimates without direct access to sales figures.)	Kee Games	Kee Games	Multi-directional shooter
Flim Flam	12,000 (approximate)^{†} 5,700	Meadows Games	Meadows Games	Sports
Gran Trak 10	10,000^{†}	Atari Inc.	Cyan Engineering	Racing
Gran Trak 20	4,500	Atari Inc.	Cyan Engineering	Racing
Clean Sweep	3,500	Ramtek Corporation	Ramtek Corporation	Sports
Baseball	2,000^{†}	Ramtek Corporation	Ramtek Corporation	Sports
Formula K (Note: Kee Games version of Gran Trak 10.)	2,000	Kee Games	Cyan Engineering	Racing
TV Basketball	1,400^{†} 500	Midway Manufacturing	Taito Corp	Sports
Leader	1,000	Midway Manufacturing	Midway Manufacturing	Sports
TV Flipper	1,000	Midway Manufacturing	Ramtek Corporation	Sports
Robot	500	Allied Leisure Industries	Allied Leisure Industries	Sports
TV Pin Game	500^{†}	Chicago Coin	Exidy	Sports
Qwak!	250	Atari Inc.	Atari Inc.	Light-gun shooter
Pin Pong	250	Atari Inc.	Atari Inc.	Sports
TV Goalee	121^{†}	Chicago Coin	Leisure & Allied Industries	Sports

^{†} Indicates a sales number given by official company sources.

Home consoles

Total Console Unit Sales: 145,000–150,000 consoles.

Total Console Revenue (retail): $9–11.3 million.

Title	Game console units (1974)	Manufacturer	Developer
Odyssey	129,000^{†} 150,000 (Note: Ralph Baer's numbers for Odyssey units sold per year contradict those of official figures disclosed by Magnavox in 1974.)	Magnavox	Sanders Associates/Magnavox

^{†} Indicates a sales number given by official company sources.

== Publications ==
- August – Masumi Akagi publishes the first issue of the Japanese coin-operated amusement publication Game Machine. The magazine runs for 28 years.
- December – The American publication Play Meter, devoted to coin-operated amusements, publishes its first issue. Founding editor is Ralph Lally II.

== Notable releases ==
- January – Dungeons & Dragons is released by Tactical Studies Rules. The pen-and-paper tabletop game is the origin of the role-playing game and would exert a major influence on video games, through the genres of RPGs and adventure games.

=== Arcade games ===
- February – Taito’s Basketball by pioneering game designer Tomohiro Nishikado features the first human-shaped characters in a coin-operated video game. Midway licenses the game for release in North America as TV Basketball, making it the first Japanese video arcade game to be officially exported to the U.S.
- March – Atari releases Gran Trak 10, a video driving game featuring advanced technology including a ROM to store graphics and course data. After initial manufacturing issues, the game becomes a massive success.
  - Meadows Games releases the enhanced ball-and-paddle game Flim Flam. It's among the most successful Pong clones, released in both upright and cocktail cabinet format.
- May – Clean Sweep is released by Ramtek, a ball-and-paddle game featuring screen-clearing gameplay. It serves as an inspiration for Breakout.
- August – Sega ships Balloon Gun in Japan, the first coin-operated video game utilizing a light gun. The method used is different from the Odyssey light gun, able to identify individual parts of the screen being shot.
- October – Baseball by Ramtek is released. In addition to being the first coin-operated sports video game to authentically depict aspects of its play, it is the first video game to represent multiple characters with animation frames on screen at once.
- November – Kee Games releases Tank. The game is a reinterpretation of Computer Space featuring custom controls and competitive gameplay. It becomes the best selling arcade video game released in 1974 in all and is seen as a defining moment for video arcade games. The game is later adapted to Atari's Video Computer System as Combat.
  - Taito releases Speed Race, a racing game featuring an early form of scrolling graphics. It helps pioneer 100 yen as a standard play price in Japan.
- December – TV Pinball by Exidy introduces eliminating solid targets to ball-and-paddle games, preceding Breakout.

=== Computer games ===
- The first version of Maze War is completed by three students at the NASA Ames Research Center in Moffett Field, California for the Imlac PDS-1 terminal. The game is seen as the progenitor of the first-person shooter.
- January – The science fiction economic strategy game Star Trader is first distributed by the People’s Computer Company via paper tape. It has a long-lasting legacy on computer systems, with subsequent iterations of the game expanding its design.
- March – Jim Bowery develops Spasim for the PLATO IV system, a graphical space flight simulator. It is the first computer game to implement true 3D graphics, rather than fixed perspective. Spasim inspires a number of PLATO flight simulation games including Airace and Airfight.
- The first version of the game Wander is developed by Peter Langston. It is the earliest example of a parser-based storytelling game; an early example of interactive fiction.

=== Hardware ===
==== Console ====
- Magnavox releases the Odyssey in European markets.
- July - Control Sales (sales arm of Universal Research Laboratories) sells the game console Video Action. It is a repurposing of Tennis Tourney by Allied Leisure, including a television and four potentiometer controls for $499 at retail. It is the second unique video game console available to consumers.
- August – Schraeder Electronics begins selling Dixi Ping Pong in the Netherlands, utilizing a custom transistor-to-transistor logic console design.
- October – Italian home appliance company Zanussi advertises the Ping-O-Tronic console. It features one-handed controllers.
  - Videomaster Ltd. of the UK sells Home T.V. Game, the first in a line of systems from the company.

== Business ==
- January 21 – Meadows Games is founded in Sunnyvale, California.
- June – David Nutting and Jefferey Fredericksen found Dave Nutting Associates in Milwaukee, Wisconsin in the facilities of coin-operated games company Milwaukee Coin Industries. Dave Nutting Associates would create several important video games published by Midway Mfg including Gun Fight, Sea Wolf, Gorf, and Wizard of Wor.
- July 10 – Kenzo Tsujimoto founds the coin-operated machine operator IPM Co. Ltd. The company later changes its name to Irem Corporation.
- July 23 – Sega Enterprises Inc. is incorporated. This is made the parent company of the Japanese Sega Enterprises Ltd. which continues to operate.
- September – Atari Inc. purchases Kee Games and makes Joseph Keenan the President of Atari. Atari continues to release games under the Kee Games label until 1978.
- October 25 – North American Philips purchases a majority share in Magnavox.

== See also ==
- 1974 in games
