= Napoleon's Last Campaigns =

Board game published in 1974

Napoleon's Last Campaigns is a board wargame published by Rand Game Associates (RGA) in 1974 that simulates the final campaigns of Napoleon in 1814 and 1815.

== Background ==
After defeat at the Battle of Leipzig in late 1813, Napoleon and his devastated army retreated to France in the face of the massive forces of the Sixth Coalition. In 1814, as the Coalition invaded France, Napoleon managed a series of brilliant victories in the Six Days' Campaign. While these repulsed the coalition forces and may have delayed the capture of Paris by at least a full month, they were not significant enough to turn the tide, and in April, Napoleon abdicated the French throne and was exiled to Elba. In March 1815, he escaped back to France, raised another army and began the campaign of a Hundred Days that would end at the Battle of Waterloo.

== Description ==
Napoleon's Last Campaigns is a two-player grand tactical wargame in which one player takes the role of Napoleon, and the other takes the role of the Allies. With only 72 counters, a small map and only 6 pages of rules, this game has been characterized as "relatively simple."

=== Gameplay ===
The game uses a simple alternating "I Go, You Go" system, where the French player moves and fires, then the Allied player has the same opportunity. The game requires use of a Turn Recorder (a turn record track for up to 30 turns) and TAC Cards (6 white cards and 6 red cards numbered from 1–6) that were not sold with the game. If the players do not have these components, they have to devise replacements for both.

==== Movement ====
The small 16" x 14" map is divided into areas rather than a hex grid. Units may move from one area to an adjacent area each turn. Only the French may move two areas in one turn by means of a "forced march."

==== Combat ====
Each unit has two Combat Power numbers on its face, one for 1814 and the other for 1815. When one unit moves into an opposing unit's square, both the attacker and defender play one of the TAC cards, which displays a number from 1 to 6. After adjustments for leaders are made, the two numbers and a die roll are cross-referenced on a 6 × 6 matrix to determine the combat result.

=== Scenarios ===
The game includes two scenarios: "1814" (24 turns) and "1815" (25 turns).

== Publication history ==
In 1974, rather than selling individual games in stores or via mail-order, RGA decided to sell a series of wargames via subscription. Players who subscribed to the series titled "Command Series, Volume I" received the first game packaged in a cardstock double LP folio as well as a large box with enough room to store the entire series of nine games. A "Universal Command Series Package" was also sent to subscribers that contained a Universal Turn Recorder, TAC Cards, and a six-sided die. Subsequent folio games then arrived every six weeks. Lee vs. Meade was the first game in this subscription series, and other games included Cambrai, 1917: The First Blitzkrieg, Invasion: Sicily – Alexander vs Kesselring, The War of the Worlds II, Missile Boat, and Napoleon's Last Campaigns. The latter was designed by David Isby, with artwork by Al Zygier.

The game proved to be unpopular — in a 1976 poll conducted by Simulations Publications Inc. to determine the most popular board wargames in North America, Napoleon's Last Campaigns placed a poor 159th out of 202 games — and quickly went out of print.

== Reception ==
In his 1977 book The Comprehensive Guide to Board Wargaming, Nick Palmer thought the game was unbalanced, commenting, "There may be bias against the French." However, he found the area map rather than the more usual hex grid map "was notably good" and questioned why it was not used more often for games of this period.

In Issue 17 of Moves (October–November 1974), Richard Berg called this game "what could be termed a 'qualified winner.' [...] a solid stimulating, strategic-level area movement rendering of the campaigns of 1814 and 1815." Berg found the game "relatively simple, but in this case simplicity does not interfere with strategic possibilities, which are many and varied." Although Berg had issues with the randomness of the combat matrix, he concluded, "All of this is immaterial, though, because NLC is fun to play; a stimulating challenge to strategic thinkers, a game filled with rewarding maneuvers and surprising pitfalls, an unusual game of which the designer can, in the main, be proud."

Writing a retrospective review six years after the game's publication, Ian Chadwick was unimpressed, saying, "Mercifully out of print, this game [...] is suitable as a collector's item only." He found several problems with the game, including the rules for both movement ("The rule for movement into forests defies logic and makes for sloppy play") and combat ("It is a wargamer's nightmare to dive into the Stygian depths of those [combat] tables so, as a result, combat is usually avoided.") Chadwick concluded by giving the game a grade of C for playability, C for component quality and C for historical accuracy, saying, "Given the unlovely map, the short but confusing rules, the lack of standard symbols on the counters, and the otherwise shoddy production, one can only hope that no one elects to resurrect this game from its well deserved obscurity."
