= Missile Boat (wargame) =

Board wargame published in 1974

Missile Boat, subtitled "Tactical Combat On, Over and Beneath the Sea 1964-1984", is a board game published by Rand Game Associates (RGA) in 1974 that simulates naval combat using ships and weaponry from the mid-1960s to the mid-1980s.

== Description ==
Missile Boat is a board wargame of tactical naval combat for two players in which each player controls from one to three ships. The rules cover naval capabilities and weaponry of the time, including electronics, missiles, wire torpedoes, aircraft support and submarines.

Depending on the scenario chosen, players each control between one and three ships. Ships and weaponry are historically accurate for scenarios set in the 1960s and early 1970s; capabilities, technology and weaponry for the scenarios set in the future — the late 1970s and early 1980s — are projected.

The original game required use of a Turn Recorder (a turn record track for up to 30 turns) and TAC Cards (6 white cards and 6 red cards numbered from 1–6) that were not sold with the game. In order to play the game without these, players have to devise replacements for both.

== Publication history ==
In 1974, rather than selling individual games in stores or via mail-order, RGA decided to sell a series of wargames via subscription. Players who subscribed to the series titled "Command Series, Volume I" received the first game packaged in a cardstock double LP folio as well as a large box with enough room to store the entire series of nine games. A "Universal Command Series Package" was also sent to subscribers that contained a Universal Turn Recorder, TAC Cards, and a six-sided die. Subsequent folio games then arrived every six weeks. Lee vs. Meade was the first game in this subscription series, and other games included Cambrai, 1917: The First Blitzkrieg, Invasion: Sicily – Alexander vs Kesselring, Napoleon's Last Campaigns, The War of the Worlds II, and Missile Boat. The latter was designed by David Isby, with artwork by Al Zygier.

== Reception ==
In a 1976 poll conducted by Simulations Publications Inc. (SPI) to determine the most popular board wargames in North America, Missile Boat placed a dismal 159th out of 202 games.

In his 1977 book The Comprehensive Guide to Board Wargaming, Nick Palmer noted that random luck rather than tactics played too high a role in the game, saying, "the game is interesting as a simulation, but weak on skill; in particular, there is a silly version of a combat matrix in which [...] the interaction with one's opponent's choice is random, so one choice is as good as another." Palmer concluded that this game was "Mainly suitable for players with a special interest in current naval combat."

Thirty years after its publication, Joe Scoleri wrote in Issue 17 of Simulacrum that this was "A lot of game in a small package." He noted the simplicity of the game system, commenting, "Low rules density and straightforward mechanics promise a fast and fun game." But he also warned that these individual games did not come with the "Universal Command Series Package" that had been sent to subscribers of the "Command Series, Volume I", and in order to play this game, players would have to construct a Turn Recorder and TAC Cards.
