= Surround (video game) =

1977 video game

- Box art by Cliff Spohn
- Developer: Atari, Inc.
- Publishers: Atari, Inc.
- Programmer: Alan Miller
- Platform: Atari 2600
- Release: September 1977
- Genre: Snake
- Modes: Single-player, multiplayer

Surround (Note: Known as Chase for the Sears release of the Atari VCS) is a 1977 snake video game programmed by Alan Miller and published by Atari, Inc. for the Atari Video Computer System (Atari VCS). (Note: The system became known as the Atari 2600 only after the release of the Atari 5200 in 1982.) In the game, players navigate a continuously moving block around an enclosed space as a wall trails behind it. Every time the opposite player hits a wall with their block, the other player earns a single point. The first player to reach ten points is the winner.

The game plays similarly to the arcade game Blockade (1976) developed by Gremlin Industries. Blockade was presented at the 1976 Music Operators of America (MOA) Expo, and led to several other game developers creating their own snake-style video games, including Atari with Surround and their arcade game Dominos (1977). The game includes several modes of Surround, which vary the speed and the number of directions the player can move. It also features two modes titled "Video Graffiti" that allow players to create simple digital illustrations.

Surround was among the launch titles for the Atari 2600. Initial reviews noted that it was complex and generally stated it to be a quality game. Retrospective reviews found the graphics and sound for Surround weak, while remaining effective as a two-player competitive game.

== Gameplay ==
A sample round in Surround. The score of the two players is displayed at the top of the screen while the players maneuver their square as it leaves a wall behind them until while player collides with it.

In Surround, two players or one player and a computer-controlled opponent attempt to navigate an enclosed space as a block. As the block moves through the space, a wall trails behind them, forming a barricade. The computer-controlled blocks move automatically across the screen and can be navigated up, down, left, right, and, in some modes, diagonally along the playing field. A player earns one point if they manage to make the other player's block crash into any barricade. The first player to reach 10 points wins.

There are variations of the competitive game: "Speed Up", "Diagonal Movement", "Erase" and "Wraparound". "Speed Up" mode makes the block move faster at different intervals during the play time. "Diagonal Movement" gives the blocks the ability to move diagonally through the playfield. "Erase" mode allows the player to push the controller button to stop creating a trail. "Wraparound" lets the player move the block to the top or side of the playfield and have it reappear on the opposite side of the screen. These modes can be chosen individually or combined for two-player games, with only the "Speed Up" option being available in single player game.

The release also features two "Video Graffiti" modes, which let the player to create digital illustrations with the joystick. One variant operates like an Etch A Sketch, while the other offers an erase option.

== Development ==
Like many of the Atari VCS launch titles, Surround was based on an established arcade game. Prior to the release of Surround, designer Lane Hauck developed the arcade game Blockade (1976) for Gremlin Industries. When it was shown at the 1976 MOA Expo in Chicago, it proved popular and Gremlin received 3,000 orders of the game. At the time of Blockade's release, counterfeiting was high and public demand for the game was not as long-lasting as the company had hoped. As they worked to adapt their new game to new tech, other companies released similar games, such as Ramtek with Barricade, Meadows Games with Bigfoot Bonkers, and Atari with Dominos for arcades and Surround for the Atari VCS.

Surround was programmed by Alan Miller. Miller previously studied computer simulations at Berkeley and graduated in 1972. In 1977, Miller responded to an ad by Atari looking for someone with microprocessor knowledge and was hired and began working on Surround as his first task. In Larry Wagner's notes from Atari at the time, the game was labeled as the Blockade game. Miller discussed the game in a 1982 interview with Bill Kunkel, describing the games graphics as "extremely crude" and its title as inappropriate as "Surrounding your opponent isn't the only, or even the best, way to win. The title, the conception, was weak."

The "Video Graffiti" mode in the game was part of a trend of early consoles such as the Fairchild Channel F, the RCA Studio II, the Bally Astrocade, and APF-MP1000, which all contained similar illustration modes.

== Release ==
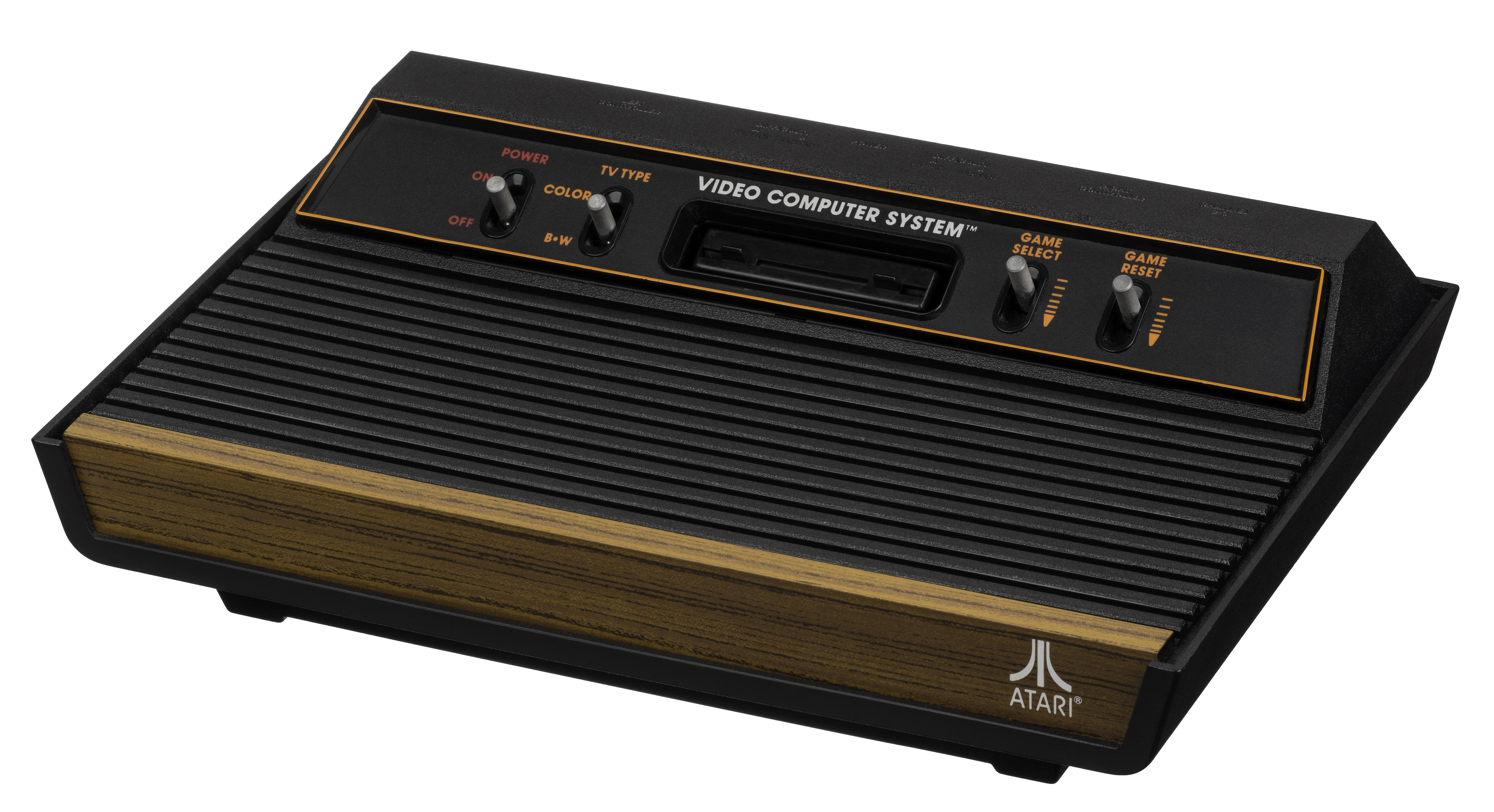
Surround was one of the launch titles for the Atari Video Computer System, later retitled the Atari 2600.

Surround was released for the Atari VCS in September 1977. The game was among the nine launch titles for the console, but was not immediately available as the earliest Atari games other than Combat (1977) were initially only obtainable by mail order. Competitors released similar games to Blockade for their home consoles around the same period, such as the Bally Astrocade being built-in with Checkmate, the APF-MP1000 with Blockout, and years later with Mattel releasing Snafu (1981) for the Intellivision. For the Sears release of the Atari VCS under their Tele-Games label, the game was titled Chase. Surround remained in circulation for over a decade, with 97 copies of the game being sold as late as 1988.

Surround was re-released in various compilation formats. These include the Atari 80 in One (2003) for Windows, the Atari Anthology (2004) for PlayStation 2 and Xbox, and the Atari 50 (2022) compilation for Nintendo Switch, PlayStation 4, Steam, and Xbox One, and in a compilation included with the release of the Atari 2600+ in 2023. It was also released to portable game compilations such as Atari Greatest Hits for Nintendo DS and iOS-based smartphones.

== Reception ==
Reception

Review scores
| Publication | Score |
|---|---|
| AllGame | 3.5/5 |
| The Complete Guide to Electronic Games | 4/5 |
| Electronic Games | 8/10 |

From contemporary reviews, two reviews came from Video, the first review found the game complex and challenging with sound effects that would keep the players alert. The review gave the first snake-game modes a 9 out of 10 rating. Bill Kunkel and Arnie Katz (under the name Frank T. Laney II) later reviewed the game in Video magazine, stating they found mode four to be the best for solo play, where the computer controlled player did not play aggressively and only tried to avoid making mistakes. The pair found the 2-player mode with faster speed and diagonal movement to be the most competitive and promoted frequent replays. David H. Ahl found all the launch titles for the Atari VCS were designed for repeat playthroughs, and that Surround specifically had complex gameplay and fantastic sound effects. Ahl appreciated the "Video Graffiti" modes inclusion, while the original review in Video dismissed them as "basically pretty dull" and gave them a 5 out of 10.

From retrospective reviews, in his book The Complete Guide to Electronic Games (1981), Howard J. Blumenthal described Surround as a game that forced players to react very quickly which made for the very best games and recommended the game to be played as a two-player game for the best experience. Both the 1983 reviews from TV Gamer and 1984 Software Encyclopedia issue of Electronic Games stated that the game had low-quality graphics and sound. The reviewer in TV Gamer noted that the game still remained popular and fun, while Electronic Games magazine specifically praised the gameplay and competitive nature of the game as excellent. Brett Alan Weiss, writing for online database AllGame, echoed the previous statements of the game's sound and visuals being overly simplistic while two-player matches were highly competitive and entertaining. Kevin Bunch, in his book Atari Archive: Vol.1 1977-1978, declared the game to be one of the highlights of the early days of the Atari VCS due to its unique style of gameplay. Bunch concluded that the 1970s titles for the system were "frequently overlooked, but Surround is one of the few–alongside with the likes of Combat, Air-Sea Battle and Indy 500–that really holds up."

== See also ==
- 1977 in video games
- List of Atari, Inc. games (1972–1984)
