= 1974 in games =

This page lists board and card games, wargames, miniatures games, and tabletop role-playing games published in 1974. For video games, see 1974 in video gaming.

== Games released or invented in 1974 ==
- 1776
- Contigo
- Dungeons & Dragons
- Empire of the Petal Throne
- Friedland 1807
- Hotels
- King Oil
- Kingmaker
- Napoleon
- Panzer Leader
- Rise and Decline of the Third Reich
- Starguard!
- Stellar Conquest
- The War of the Worlds II
- Warriors of Mars
- Wooden Ships and Iron Men

== Game awards given in 1974 ==
- Charles S. Roberts Award for Best Professional Game of 1974: Rise and Decline of the Third Reich

== Significant game-related events in 1974 ==
- West End Games was founded by Daniel Scott Palter.

== See also ==
- 1974 in video gaming
