= Blockade (video game) =

1976 video game

- Arcade flyer
- Developer: Gremlin
- Publishers: NA/AU: Gremlin; JP: Taito (as Barricade II); NA: Noval, Inc. (Noval 760)
- Designer: Lane Hauck
- Programmers: Lane Hauck; Ago Kiss
- Platforms: Arcade, Noval 760
- Release: Arcade: NA: November 1976; JP: March 1977; Noval 760: NA: 1977
- Genre: Snake
- Mode: Multiplayer

Blockade is an arcade video game developed by Lane Hauck and Ago Kiss for Gremlin and released in November 1976. It is a two-player game where each player controls the direction of an arrow on the screen which creates a trail behind it. The object is to avoid any walls surrounding the playfield or trails created by each player for a select amount of turns. Blockade spawned many clones which came to be known as snake games.

The game was designed by Lane Hauck. Prior to joining Gremlin, he had taught himself to code and met with the team at Gremlin before their entry into the arcade game market. After experimenting with a physics problem in assembly language, he created a game where a trail was left behind a player that disallowed them to return to a position they had already visited. After showing the concept to the staff at Gremlin, it was developed into a video game, test marketed and released to great acclaim at the 1976 Music Operators of America in Chicago. As Gremlin were new to developing arcade games, before they could release it publicly, several other companies such as Atari, Inc., Ramtek, and Meadows Games released their own variations of the game, leading to many pre-sales being cancelled for Gremlin.

== Gameplay ==
Two players each control one of the arrows on the screen.

Blockade is a two-player game where each player controls the direction of an arrow on the screen. Each player utilizes a set of push-button controls to change the direction of the moving arrow. When it moves, the arrow leaves a trail of blocks behind, which form a continuous wall. Anytime the player collides with a wall created by either player or the barrier wall on the screen, an explosion sound is heard, the symbol flashes, and a point is rewarded to the opponent.

After a pre-set number of crashes happen to the player, the game ends. The pre-set number is set by the operator of the arcade, ranging from 3 to 6.

== Development ==
Gremlin was a San Diego–based coin-op arcade manufacturer that started in 1970. Designer Lane Hauck, a physics and engineering graduate of UCLA and Cal State, purchased a Digital Equipment Corporation (DEC) PDP-8 computer to teach himself assembly language. Hauck played games on the system such as Moo and began to grow interested in simplifying complex technology to make it more affordable. He soldered together twenty-five logic circuits to create a handheld device that could play Moo. He later made other small machines which could play games like Blackjack.

At the time, Gremlin was in the market of Wall games, which were rectangular paintings and displayed one static picture, such as a series of lights turning on to simulate a game of baseball. No staff at Gremlin knew anything about microprocessors at the time, and when meeting at Gremlin's office, the staff met Hauck which led to him developing a Wall game for them called Fooswall that used microprocessors.

Hauck felt that it would be fun to explore a physics problem he referred to as the Drunk and the Lamppost, where the drunk starts out near the lamppost and can move in any direction, at random. The problem involved predicting the direction the drunk will tend to move. To test out the problem visually, Hauck wrote a program in which the computer randomly picked either an up, down, left, or right direction to move an arrow. On a display screen, Hauck stated that "the thing flitted around a little bit and sure enough, as physics predicts, the thing stayed close to the lamppost". Growing bored with the project, he felt that it would be more interesting if the drunk could not move to a square he visited before and made it so a square lit up and would remain illuminated even when moving the arrow to a new square and eventually get trapped. Hauck did not expect this result, and it led to him developing a game where two players move and try to avoid hitting each other, creating a trailing maze behind them. Hauck commented that "It showed me that the video game is not only highly interactive for the player, but also for the designer. After awhile, the model is teaching you some things!"

Hauck later added small touches, such as electronic beeps that sounded when the arrows moved and an explosive noise accompanying the arrows crashing. He showed it to one of Gremlin founders, Frank Fogleman. Fogleman liked the design and agreed to do a public test of the prototype under the name Blockade. Hauck recalls that Blockade was the very first name which came to Fogleman's mind, and after purchasing a cabinet and monitor, they tested the game at a miniature golf course. They recalled that they "watched very carefully and ... saw a lot of people put money in it and have fun with it. It was exciting." Following successful tests, Hauck worked on turning it into a full game. By November 1976, Gremlin had refined the prototype, and Hauck developed it into a four-player version titled CoMotion.

== Release ==
It was shown at the 1976 Music Operators of America (MOA) Expo in Chicago, where Gremlin received 3000 orders of the game. Hauck recalled that their team realized they did not know anything about wood cabinets or television monitors. At the time of Blockade's release, counterfeiting was high, and public demand for the game was not as long-lasting as the company had hoped. As they adapted to this new material and tech, other companies released similar games such as Atari, Inc. with Dominos, Ramtek with Barricade, Bally with Checkmate (included in the Bally Astrocade), and Meadows Games with Bigfoot Bonkers. Barricade was so similar to Blockade that Gremlin threatened to sue Ramtek but dropped their suit after Ramtek agreed to not release the game. Dennis Koble of Atari stated that Blockade was "really fun and very popular and, as was common in those days, everyone had to jump on the bandwagon".

Months later, when Gremlin's Blockade was distributed in November 1976, the market had shrunk, leading to the game releasing only a small fraction they had presold at the show. This left Gremlin with a large inventory of circuit boards, cabinets and monitors. The company had no legal recourse at the period against the clones of the games. After the team from Gremlin returned from Chicago, they began filing patents for Blockade and received faster consideration from the patent office due to the market of clones already released. It took a year and a half to win the patent, which Hauck stated at the time "no one even remembered Blockade. The net effect is that in the game business, patents are absolutely worthless."

== Reception ==
In November 1977, Play Meter ranked the top highest ranking arcade games from the past 12 months. Blockade was Gremlin's highest ranked game, tying for 10th place along with Indy 4 by Atari.

From contemporary reviews, Ray Pasziewicz, a Baltimore coin-machine operator, said he specifically praised Blockade at the MOA show, noting the games competitiveness and that "I stood there and played it for a long time and I was excited over it." In a report in Play Meter magazine, Ralph C. Lally II said that Blockade was "probably the most played game at the show" and that the game was an "excellent example of a good game based on a rather simple concept", declaring the game great and that it "could just well turn out to be the Tank everybody was hoping for this year".

From retrospective reviews, in his book The Video Games Guide, Matt Fox gave the game a four out of five-star rating, stating he could forgive the game for its visual simplicity due to its vintage and that the game had a "timeless quality", declaring it "simple, competitive, addictive fun".

== Legacy ==
After witnessing a mother and daughter play Blockade and constantly hit each other and laugh at them exploding, Lane Hauck developed the arcade game Fortress. By 1977, Gremlin had no major hit arcade games following Blockade which led to the company being purchased by Sega on September 29, 1978.

Blockade is the progenitor of the snake video game genre which features hundreds of games, including multiple arcade clones of Blockade, the Atari Video Computer System's Surround (1977), the 1982 single-player home computer game Snake Byte, and Snake (1998) for Nokia's mobile phones.

Dennis Koble, the developer of Atari's Dominos, said his game was not derivative from Blockade. He said in a 2020 interview that prior to Gremlin's release, he had seen similar games on ARPANET and CompuServe.
