= 1776 (disambiguation) =

1776 is a year.

1776 may also refer to:

- 1776 (musical), a 1969 musical based on the events leading to the writing and signing of the United States Declaration of Independence
  - 1776 (film), a 1972 film adaptation of the above musical
- 1776 (book), a 2005 book by David McCullough about the events surrounding the start of the American Revolution
- 1776 (game), a 1974 Avalon Hill board wargame based on the American Revolution
- 1776, a 2013 album by King Conquer

== See also ==
- 1776 Project
- 17776, a 2017 speculative fiction narrative by Jon Bois
