= Cambrai (disambiguation) =

Cambrai is a city in France, formerly called Cambray and historically in English Camerick or Camericke. It may also refer to:

== Places ==
=== France ===
- Archdiocese of Cambrai, a Catholic archdiocese in northern France
- Arrondissment of Cambrai, an arrondissement of France in the Hauts-de-France region
- Cambrai Cathedral, a Catholic cathedral in Cambrai
- Prince-Bishopric of Cambrai, or the Cambrésis, a former territory of the Hoy Roman Empire centred on Cambrai and roughly corresponding with the modern arrondissement

=== Australia ===
- Cambrai, South Australia, a small town in Australia

=== Canada ===
- Cambray, Ontario, a rural Canadian community

=== Malta ===
- Fort Chambray, sometimes spelled Fort Chambrai or Cambray, a fort in Malta

=== United States ===
- Cambray, New Mexico, a ghost town in Luna County, New Mexico

== Battles and wars ==
- War of the League of Cambrai (1508–1516), also known as the War of the Holy League, part of the Italian Wars
- Battle of Cambrai (1917) in World War I, noted for the initially successful use of tanks in a large-scale combined arms operation
- Battle of Cambrai (1918), in October 1918

== Entertainment ==
- Cambrai, 1917: The First Blitzkrieg, a 1974 wargame that simulates the 1917 battle
- Cambrai, a fictional country on the US soap opera Guiding Light

== People ==
- William Cambray (1894–1978), British WWI flying ace

== See also ==
- Cambric, a fabric named after the French city
- Combray, a commune in Normandy, France
- Cambria (disambiguation)
