= Gotcha (video game) =

1973 arcade game

- Flyer showing the original cabinet design
- Developer: Atari
- Publishers: NA: Atari; JP: Namco
- Designer: Allan Alcorn
- Platform: Arcade
- Release: NA: October 11, 1973; JP: November 1974
- Genre: Maze
- Mode: Multiplayer

Gotcha is an arcade video game developed by Atari and released in October 1973. It was the fourth game by the company, after the 1972 Pong, which marked the beginning of the commercial video game industry along with the Magnavox Odyssey, and the 1973 Space Race and Pong Doubles. In the game, two players move through a maze, which continually changes over time. One player, the Pursuer, attempts to catch the other, the Pursued; if they do, a point is scored, and the players reset positions. The game emits an electronic beeping sound, which increases in pace as the Pursuer gets closer to the Pursued, and each game lasts a set amount of time.

Gotcha was designed by Allan Alcorn, the designer of Pong, and a prototype was constructed by Cyan Engineering, Atari's semi-independent research and development subsidiary. Development began in July 1973 as part of Atari's strategy to develop multiple types of games to separate themselves from their competitors, who they saw as focused primarily on creating Pong clones. The cabinet was designed by George Faraco, initially with the joysticks encased in pink domes meant to represent breasts. Although this design inspired the advertising flyer on which it appears behind a man chasing a woman in a nightdress, it was changed to use regular joysticks soon after release.

The game was not commercially successful; later sources have termed it as "arousing little more than controversy", though one source claims it sold 3,000 units. In addition to the main black-and-white game, limited runs were produced of a tinted color version and a true multi-color version of the game; the latter is believed to be the first color arcade game.

== Gameplay ==
Gotcha is a two-player maze game in which one player attempts to catch the other. The maze is composed of a repeating pattern of elements set in multiple columns on the screen. The "Pursuer" is represented by a square, while the "Pursued" is identified by a plus sign. As the Pursuer gets closer to the Pursued, an electronic beeping sound plays at an increasing rate until the Pursuer reaches the Pursued. Whenever the Pursued is caught, the Pursuer scores a point, the maze disappears for a brief moment, and the Pursuer is moved to a random position on the right side of the screen. There is no score for the Pursued, so determining who won is left to the players.

The maze itself is continually changing, with two invisible lines half a screen apart scanning down the maze and overwriting maze elements. Above the maze is the Pursuer's score and the time elapsed in the game.

Each game is for a set period of time. When time runs out, the game enters attract mode, where the score resets and the square and plus sign begin bouncing around the maze in a diagonal pattern as the maze continues to change. Each game costs a quarter. The time per round is adjustable per machine over a range from 30 seconds to 2 minutes.

== Development ==
Gameplay screenshot, showing the unique maze style of the game composed of scattered pieces of graphics elements. The score is at 0, while the timer is at 1.

Development on Gotcha began in July 1973, as Atari's fourth game after Pong, Space Race, and Pong Doubles. The company was interested in producing a very different game from their previous success of Pong, as they felt that innovative design was what would separate them from their competitors, which they saw as flooding the market with Pong clones rather than making new video games. After the release of Space Race, development immediately moved on to Gotcha. The design of the game was done by Allan Alcorn, the designer of Pong and developer for Space Race. Alcorn had the idea for the game from a defect he sometimes saw when testing Pong machines: if part of the circuit that converted scores to images on the screens was broken, then parts of the numbers would be scattered across the screen. Alcorn thought that combining that defect intentionally with a motion circuit could create dynamically changing mazes. A prototype design was developed by Steve Mayer of Cyan Engineering, which had recently become a semi-independent research and development subsidiary of Atari.

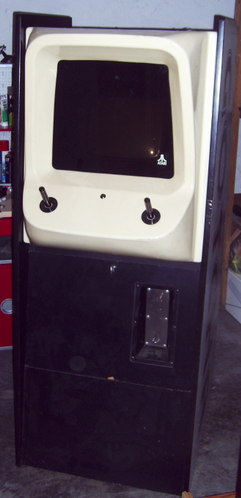
Final version of the Gotcha cabinet, without the dome controllers

The cabinet for the game was designed by Atari's product designer, George Faraco. His design featured a joystick for each player, which was encased in a pink dome that the player would rest their hands on to control the joysticks, meant to resemble breasts. Faraco later acknowledged that "they didn't have bumps on them or anything, but the way they were the size of grapefruits next to each other, you got the impression of what they were supposed to be." Atari's second engineer, Don Lange, who assisted with the game, has also stated that the design was intentional on the part of Faraco, who fellow Atari designer Regan Chang has claimed "had some really far out ideas". According to rumor, Faraco got the idea from a joke that joysticks resembled phalluses, and that Atari should make a game with female controls.

Like Faraco's initial design for Space Race, which was changed due to its expense after a few dozen units, the joysticks for Gotcha were changed to standard ones shortly into the production run prior to the October 11, 1973 release. The design did inspire the advertising flyer for the game, however, which features a man chasing a woman in a nightdress with the initial design of the cabinet behind them. The final cabinet stands over 5 feet tall and weighs nearly 200 pounds. The breast-like controllers reappeared in yellow in prototype versions of the 1974 Touch Me arcade game, but were not used in production. Due to their acquisition of Atari's Japanese division, Namco distributed the game in Japan in November 1974.

In an August 3, 1973, memo to the Atari engineering department, co-founder Nolan Bushnell laid out plans for the company to create a prototype 20-player version of Gotcha in time for a trade show later that year, though no such game was ever made. Instead, released at the same time as Gotcha and showcased at the early November 1973 Music Operators of America (MOA) Music & Amusement Machines Exposition were two additional versions of Gotcha: one with a tinted color overlay, and a true multi-color version of Gotcha with red, blue, and green colors. The color version of Gotcha was not widely produced, with between 20 and 100 machines released, but is believed to be the first color arcade game ever made, released over a month before Wimbledon, a color Pong clone.

== Legacy ==
Gotcha was not commercially successful; later sources have described it as receiving a "lukewarm reception" and "arousing little more than controversy". Ralph Baer, however, claimed it sold 3,000 units, which would make it the seventh best-selling arcade video game of 1973 according to him. Additionally, despite Gotcha's prominence as Atari's fourth game and their second game not related to Pong, the 1973 arcade video game market was largely dominated by Pong clones; while Pong was the fourth arcade video game ever produced, Gotcha was approximately the twentieth, with nearly all the other games released before and after Gotcha through the end of the year Pong clones. Gotcha was the first arcade maze video game, though non-commercial maze-based video games had been developed as early as the 1959 Mouse in the Maze mainframe game.

== Sources ==
- Baer, Ralph H. (2005). Videogames: In the Beginning. Rolenta Press. ISBN 978-0-9643848-1-1.
- Collins, Karen (2008-08-08). Game Sound: An Introduction to the History, Theory, and Practice of Video Game Music and Sound Design. MIT Press. ISBN 978-0-262-03378-7.
- Flanagan, Mary; Nissenbaum, Helen (2014-06-25). Values at Play in Digital Games. MIT Press. ISBN 978-0-262-32445-8.
- Goldberg, Marty; Vendel, Curt (2012-11-25). Atari Inc.: Business Is Fun. Syzygy Press. ISBN 978-0-9855974-0-5.
- Kent, Steven L. (2001-09-06). The Ultimate History of Video Games. Three Rivers Press. ISBN 978-0-7615-3643-7.
- Loguidice, Bill; Barton, Matt (2012-08-21). Vintage Games: An Insider Look at the History of Grand Theft Auto, Super Mario, and the Most Influential Games of All Time. CRC Press. ISBN 978-1-136-13758-7.
- Sheff, David (2011-11-02). Game Over: How Nintendo Conquered The World. Random House. ISBN 978-0-307-80074-9.
