= 1973 in video games =

The year 1973 saw a substantial increase in the number of video games created and distributed. In coin-operated games, a craze for Pong-style games ignited the first fad for video games both in the United States and other countries such as Japan and the United Kingdom. Time-sharing networks saw greater proliferation of popular programs through type-in listings. The PLATO system located at the University of Illinois Urbana-Champaign played host to some of the earliest massively multiplayer games.

== Events ==
- January – Pong is licensed to Midway Mfg, subsidiary of Bally, for release as Winner.
- March – Atari Inc. launches Pong nationally to distributors of coin-operated games across the United States.
- August 26–28 – The fourth U.S. American Computer Chess Championship is held in Atlanta, Georgia. It is won by Northwestern University's Chess 3.5 running on a CDC 6400 computer, successor to the undefeated champion from the prior three years.
- September – The Japanese Amusement Association show is held in Tokyo. The company Kansai Seiki displays the prototype game Playtron, among the first games utilizing color graphics – though it is never released.
- November 9–11 – The Music Operators of America show is held in Chicago, Illinois. Over a dozen companies exhibit video games at the show, almost all clones or variants of Pong.

== Financial performance ==
=== United States ===
==== Arcade ====
Total Video Game Cabinets: 50,000-70,000 units.

Total Video Game Revenue (machine sales): $20 million-$77 million.

| Title | Arcade cabinet units (Lifetime) | Manufacturer | Developer | Genre |
|---|---|---|---|---|
| Paddle Battle | 17,000 | Allied Leisure Industries | Universal Research Laboratories | Sports |
| Pro Tennis | 7,000 (Note: Ralph Baer's numbers compiled in April 1976 are mostly estimates without direct access to sales figures.) | Williams Electronics | Magnetic Corporation of America | Sports |
| Winner | 7,000^{†} | Midway Manufacturing | Atari Inc. | Sports |
| Tennis Tourney | 5,000 | Allied Leisure Industries | Universal Research Laboratories | Sports |
| Super Soccer | 5,000 | Allied Leisure Industries | Universal Research Laboratories | Sports |
| TV Ping Pong | 3,300^{†} | Ramtek Corporation | Ramtek Corporation | Sports |
| Gotcha | 3,000 | Atari Inc. | Atari Inc. | Maze |
| Asteroid (Note: Licensed version of Space Race.) | 2,000 | Midway Manufacturing | Atari Inc. | Racing |
| Hockey | 2,000 | Ramtek Corporation | Ramtek Corporation | Sports |
| Space Race | 1,500 | Atari Inc. | Atari Inc. | Racing |
| TV Tennis | 1,000^{†} 5,000 | Chicago Coin | Chicago Coin | Sports |
| Volly | 1,000 | Ramtek Corporation | Ramtek Corporation | Sports |
| Olympic TV Hockey/ Olympic TV Football (Note: Released under both names.) | 750^{†} 1,000 | Chicago Coin | Chicago Coin | Sports |
| Elimination! | 500 | Kee Games | Atari Inc. | Sports |
| Pong Doubles (Note: Atari's version of Elimination!.) | 500 | Atari Inc. | Atari Inc. | Sports |

^{†} Indicates a sales number given by official company sources.

Home consoles

Total Console Revenue (retail): $4.6 million.

| Title | Game console units (1973) | Manufacturer | Developer |
|---|---|---|---|
| Odyssey | 89,000^{†} 83,000 (Note: Ralph Baer's numbers for Odyssey units sold per year contradict those of official figures disclosed by Magnavox in 1974.) | Magnavox Co. | Sanders Associates/Magnavox |

^{†} Indicates a sales number given by official company sources.

== Publications ==
- July – 101 BASIC Computer Games, edited and compiled by David Ahl, is published by Digital Equipment Corporation. The publication is vital in the dissemination of influential mainframe games like Hamurabi, Star Trek, and Lunar Landing variants.

== Notable releases ==
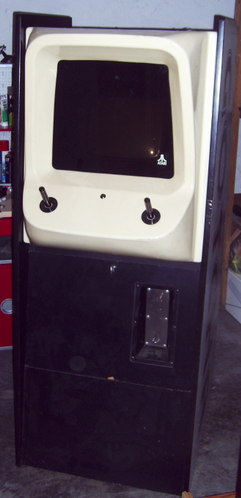
Gotcha

=== Arcade games ===
- March – Volly by Ramtek Corp, Rally by For-Play Manufacturing, and Paddle Battle by Allied Leisure are released in the United States, among the first clones of Pong.
- April – Ping-Pong by Alca Electronics is released in the UK as the first European coin-op video game.
- July – Sega releases Pong-Tron and Taito releases Elepong, the first two video games produced for the coin-operated games market in Japan.
  - Atari Inc. releases Space Race, a combination of a racing game and obstacle avoidance.
- August – Tennis Tourney by Allied Leisure is released, the first four-player variant of Pong.
- September – Gotcha is released by Atari, a game featuring characters in a maze. The game is notable for its low-production variant, Color Gotcha, which may be the first commercially released video game utilizing color graphics.
- October – Elimination! is released by Kee Games, a ball-and-paddle game featuring up to four people in an elimination-style contest. Atari's version is released as Quadrapong.
- December – Nutting Associates releases the ball-and-paddle game Wimbledon, among the first color games.

=== Computer games ===
- February 25 – Jack Burness completes Moonlander, a graphical version of the Lunar Lander game concept for the DEC GT-40 intelligent terminal. His version features the first overworld map and the first Easter egg in a video game.
- May – Hunt the Wumpus by Gregory Yob is first distributed on paper tape by the People's Computer Company newsletter.
  - Empire by John Daleske of Iowa State University is released on the PLATO IV, a game featuring trading and resource management elements with up to eight players.
- August – Empire II is released to PLATO by John Daleske and Silas Warner. This version evolved into an arena combat shooting game featuring fifty simultaneous players on any of eight teams.

=== Console games ===
- July – Magnavox releases the games Interplanetary Voyage, Basketball, W.I.N., and Brain Wave for the Odyssey at retail. Previously they had provided the game Percepts to customers who returned their survey card, but these were the first commercial releases of console games separate from the hardware.

=== Hardware ===
==== Consoles ====
- Official test markets for the Odyssey console outside of North America begin.
- Several clones of the Odyssey appear in Europe, including Spain's Overkal.

== Business ==
- March 19 – Konami Industry Co., Ltd. is formerly incorporated in Japan by Kagemasa Kōzuki, Yoshinobu Naka, and Tatsuo Miyasako.
- May – The company Hudson is established in Sapporo, Japan as the business arm of the radio shop CQ Hudson. The company later changes its name to Hudson Soft when it begins selling computers and associated software.
- August – Atari opens their Atari Japan subsidiary to import games for the domestic market.
- September 25 – Kee Games Inc. is founded in California. The company is majority owned by the principals of Atari but is presented as a competitor.
- October 19 – Exidy Inc. is founded by former Ramtek engineer Pete Kauffman and Samuel Hawes. Their first product was a Pong clone.
- Taito Co Ltd. – in the business of coin-operated amusements as well as general import and export – opens its office Taito America in Illinois, the first Japanese company involved with video games to open an American office.
- The toy company Nintendo Co. Ltd. establishes the label Nintendo Leisure System to release coin-operated games, starting with the electro-mechanical Laser Clay Shooting Range.
- Videomaster of the UK is established to distribute coin-operated Pong games throughout the nation.

== See also ==
- 1973 in games
