= Barricade (video game) =

1977 video game

- Developer: Ramtek
- Publisher: Ramtek
- Platform: Arcade
- Release: 1977
- Genre: Snake
- Mode: Multiplayer (2 players or 4 players)

A game of Barricade

Barricade is a clone of Blockade released by Ramtek in 1977. It is an early entry of the Snake genre. The game supports two or four players.

== Similar arcade games ==
- Bigfoot Bonkers (Meadows Games, 1976)
- CheckMate (Dave Nutting Associates, 1977)
- CoMotion (Gremlin Industries, March 1977)
- Dominos/4 (Atari, January 1977)
- Minesweeper (AmuTech, Ltd., 1977)
