= Space Race (video game) =

1973 arcade game

- Advertising flyer
- Developer: Atari, Inc.
- Publishers: NA/EU: Atari, Inc.; JP: Namco
- Designer: Ted Dabney
- Platform: Arcade
- Release: NA: July 16, 1973; EU: 1973; JP: July 1974
- Genre: Racing
- Mode: Multiplayer

Space Race is an arcade game developed by Atari, Inc. and released on July 16, 1973. It was the second game by the company, after Pong (1972), which marked the beginning of the commercial video game industry along with the Magnavox Odyssey. In the game, two players each control a rocket ship, with the goal of being the first to move their ship from the bottom of the screen to the top. Along the way are asteroids, which the players must avoid. Space Race was the first racing arcade video game and the first game with a goal of crossing the screen while avoiding obstacles.

Development of Space Race began in Summer 1972 under the name Asteroid by Atari co-founder Nolan Bushnell, based on ideas by him and co-founder Ted Dabney. The final design was done by Dabney, possibly with assistance by Bushnell and Pong designer Allan Alcorn. The game was planned to be quick to create to fulfill an earlier contract with Midway Manufacturing. The engineering and prototyping was done by Alcorn; after it was completed and the design given to Midway to be released as Asteroid, Atari produced its own nearly identical version as Space Race. Fifty Space Race cabinets were produced using a fiberglass design by George Faraco before the rest of the production was switched to a cheaper standard cabinet.

Space Race was not commercially successful; Bushnell said that it was much less popular than Pong. Midway held that the release of Space Race violated Atari's contract with them for Asteroid, and the companies agreed for Atari to forfeit royalty payments for the game.

== Gameplay ==
Gameplay of Space Race, with the timer near the start of the game and player 2 in the lead

Space Race is a two-player arcade game. In the game, the two players each control a spaceship, which they fly from the bottom of the screen to the top. Along the way are dashes representing asteroids moving across the screen from left to right, which the players must avoid. Movement controls are limited to moving the spaceship up or down; if the player's ship is hit by an asteroid it disappears for a few seconds before reappearing at the bottom again. The game displays a starfield in the background, as well as each player's score, which increases whenever a player makes it to the top first. Each game is for a set amount of time, represented by a line in the bottom middle of the screen that shortens during the game, with the winner being the player with the higher score when time runs out. Each game costs a quarter. Machines can be set to play one or two rounds per game, and the time per round is adjustable per machine over a range from 45 seconds to 3 minutes.

== Development ==
Development of Space Race began soon after the founding of Atari in summer 1972 under the name Asteroid. Co-founders Nolan Bushnell and Ted Dabney had the initial idea for the game while developing the 1971 Computer Space, the first arcade video game, but felt the more complicated Computer Space was a better first game. After leaving Nutting Associates and founding Atari in May 1972, Bushnell spent a few days designing Asteroid, but soon had to drop the project to focus on running the company. After the release of Pong, Atari's first game, development resumed on the title in Spring 1973. Dabney has claimed credit for the game's final design, though Pong designer Allan Alcorn has stated that he and Bushnell may have been involved as well. Asteroid, codenamed VP-2, was designed to be a racing game that would be simple to create to fulfill an earlier contract with Midway Manufacturing; Atari had initially offered Pong during its development to fulfill the contract, but had been rejected. The company was also interested in producing a very different game from their previous success, as they felt that innovative design was what would separate them from their competitors, which they saw as flooding the market with Pong clones rather than making new video games.

The engineering and prototyping for Asteroid was done by Alcorn. The game is encoded entirely in discrete electronic components, like Atari's earlier games, and unlike later computer-based arcade games; the graphics are all simple line elements with the exception of the spacecraft, which are generated based on diodes on the circuit board arranged in the shape of half of a ship to represent the shape they create. That half ship is mirrored on the screen, similar to the diode array in Computer Space, which generated eight directions of a rotating ship with a mirrored four images. The game was completed quickly, and Alcorn soon moved on to Atari's third game, Gotcha. When the game was complete, the design was given to Midway to sell as Asteroid, only for Atari to produce a nearly identical version itself titled Space Race, which was released on July 16, 1973. Namco released the game in Japan due to their acquisition of Atari's Japanese division, releasing it in July 1974.

A fiberglass Space Race cabinet was designed for the game by Atari's product designer, George Faraco. The tall, angular cabinet, reminiscent of the fiberglass cabinet for Computer Space, was the first to display the Atari logo. The cabinet design was distinctive enough that Bushnell considered using it for Pong as well, but the production costs proved too high and only 50 units were made before the design was dropped and Space Race switched to a more traditional rectangular cabinet. The final cabinet stands nearly 5 feet tall and weighs over 200 pounds. Bushnell later stated that the molds to make the fiberglass cabinets cost US$2000 and could only make one per day due to the complicated shape, and Atari felt the cost did not justify buying enough molds to make a full production run in a reasonable amount of time. The final Space Race cabinet was reused later that same year for Pong Doubles, a four-player version of Pong.

== Legacy ==
Poster for Astro Race (1973), showing the same gameplay and visuals as Space Race

Space Race was not commercially successful; Nolan Bushnell has described it as "not as successful as Pong by a wide margin", and Ralph Baer claims that it sold around 1,500 units. It inspired a clone game, Taito's 1973 Astro Race, and according to Bushnell also inspired an unsuccessful clone version by Nutting Associates. Midway felt that the release of Space Race violated their contract with Atari for Asteroid, and the two companies agreed in exchange to drop Atari's three percent royalty cut for Asteroid machines. Baer claims Asteroid sold 2,000 units, making Asteroid and Space Race the eighth and ninth best-selling arcade video games of 1973 according to him.

Despite Space Race's prominence as Atari's second game and the first after Pong, the 1973 arcade video game market was largely dominated by Pong clones; while Pong was the fourth arcade video game ever produced, Space Race was approximately the fourteenth, with nine Pong clones between them and mostly only other clones filling out the rest of the year's releases.

Space Race was the first arcade racing game, as well as the first game with a goal of crossing the screen while avoiding obstacles, though a few racing games had been released in 1972 for the Magnavox Odyssey home video game console. Later games in that genre are the arcade game Frogger and the Atari 2600 Freeway, both from 1981. A similarly-titled, expanded version of Space Race was published by ANALOG Software in 1981 for the Atari 8-bit computers as Race in Space.

In July 2013, Space Race was one of the titles that was sold to Tommo during the Atari bankruptcy proceedings.

== Sources ==
- Akagi, Masumi (2006-10-13). アーケードTVゲームリスト 国内•海外編 (1971-2005) [Arcade TV Game List: Domestic • Overseas Edition (1971-2005)] (in Japanese). Amusement News Agency. ISBN 978-4-9902512-1-5.
- Baer, Ralph H. (2005). Videogames: In the Beginning. Rolenta Press. ISBN 978-0-9643848-1-1.
- Collins, Karen (2008-08-08). Game Sound: An Introduction to the History, Theory, and Practice of Video Game Music and Sound Design. MIT Press. ISBN 978-0-262-03378-7.
- Goldberg, Marty; Vendel, Curt (2012-11-25). Atari Inc.: Business Is Fun. Syzygy Press. ISBN 978-0-9855974-0-5.
- Ramsay, Morgan (2012-06-08). Gamers at Work: Stories Behind the Games People Play. Apress. ISBN 978-1-4302-3352-7.
- Wolf, Mark J. P. (2007-11-30). The Video Game Explosion: A History from PONG to PlayStation and Beyond. Greenwood Publishing Group. ISBN 978-0-313-33868-7.
- Wolf, Mark J. P.; Perron, Bernard (2014-01-03). The Routledge Companion to Video Game Studies. Routledge. ISBN 978-1-136-29050-3.
