= Clean Sweep (1974 video game) =

1974 video game

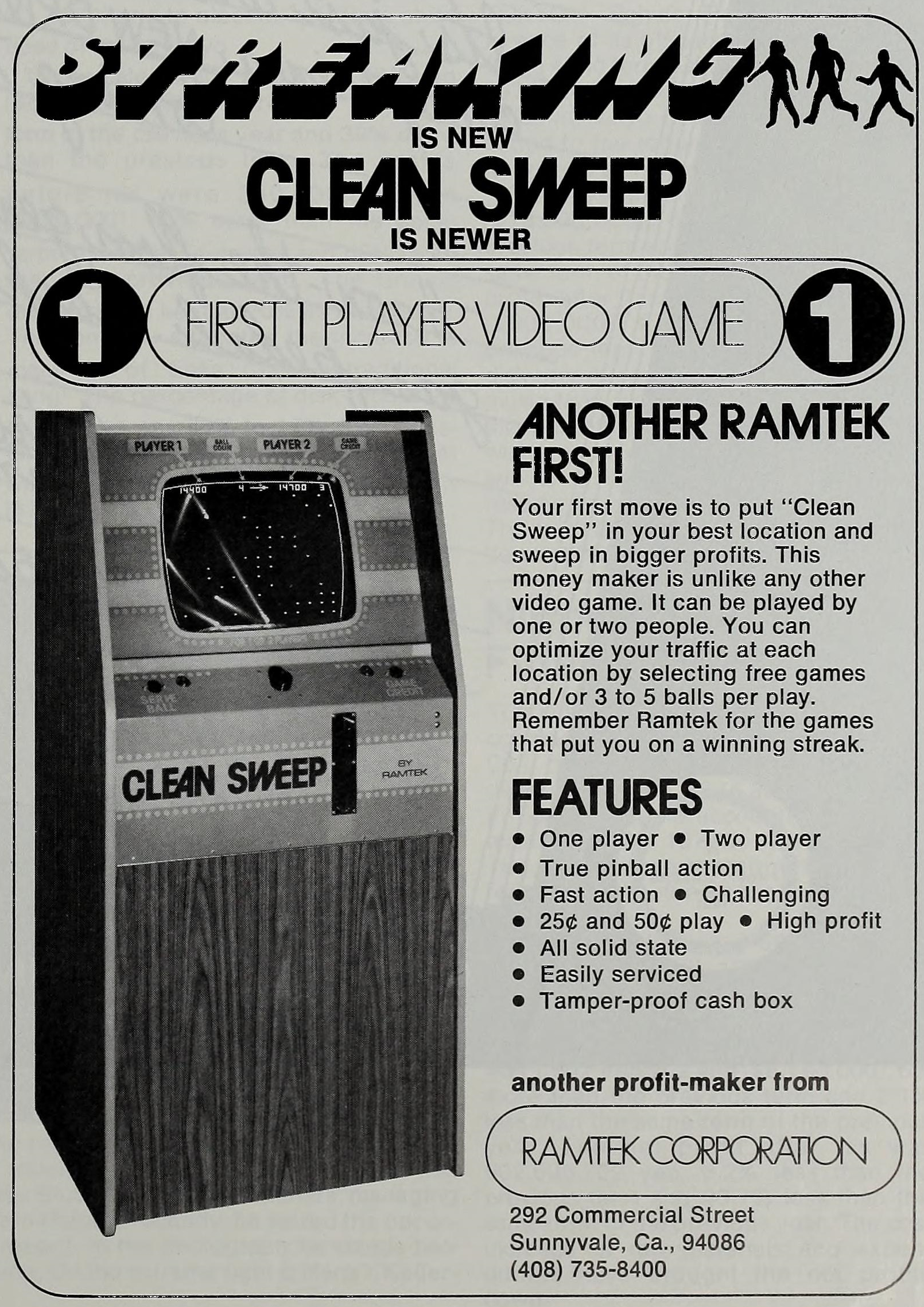
- Trade advertisement from Cash Box for Clean Sweep.
- Developer: Ramtek
- Publisher: Ramtek
- Designer: Howell Ivy
- Platform: Arcade
- Release: April 1974
- Genre: Action
- Mode: Single-player

Clean Sweep is a coin-operated video game released by Ramtek in April 1974. Developed by Howell Ivy, the game is an evolution of the ball-and-paddle genre first pioneered in the arcade with Pong. In the game, players are tasked with eliminating dots which cover the screen using a ball which they bounce off of their rounded paddle. If the player misses the ball three or five times (depending on the dip switch setting) then their game is over. Score is tracked for one or two players.

The game was a success for Ramtek and helped to inspire the creation of Breakout by Atari.

== Gameplay ==
Clean Sweep is controlled with a potentiometer which moves a rounded paddle located on the bottom of the screen. Upon starting the game, a ball is launched into the playfield which is bounded on three sides. When the ball makes contact with a dot on the screen, it eliminates the dot – without changing trajectory – and adds to the player's score. In order to alter the course of the ball, a player must position their paddle so the ball strikes it at a particular angle. The number of angles are limited and will always follow the same path without variable physics. If a player is successful in eliminating all of the dots on the screen before the end of the game, they have completed a "clean sweep" and are awarded a free play.

The game includes an early form of lives in the form of missing the ball to indicate a try. The earlier Elimination! by Kee Games had the first version of this system in a multi-player context, but Clean Sweep introduced its use to limit the play of a single-player game. Two players could compete in the game with trade-off multi-player, in which each player alternate position depending on when the other player lost their ball. An arrow situated between the two scores indicates which player is currently up.

== Development ==
Howell Ivy was an electrical engineer working at Onizuka Air Force Station in Sunnyvale, California in 1972 when he played Computer Space and Pong. Inspired by his work on radar systems, he created a Pong-style game in his apartment and sought out the nearby Ramtek Corporation to see if they would be interested in it. The company paid him $2,000 for the game – though ultimately did not release it. Ivy thereafter worked alongside Ramtek engineer and co-founder John Metzler to create games for the company as an independent contractor while remaining part of the Air Force.

With Clean Sweep, Ivy wanted to create a more dynamic game than early Pong clones which required more precise manipulation of the paddle. He filled the screen with discrete dots which required the player to guide the ball to every part of the screen. The entire game was created with transistor-transistor logic (TTL) with no stored program. To facilitate the addition and removal of the dots, Ivy included a random-access memory chip – the first known use of the technology in an arcade game. To indicate that the paddle could direct the ball depending on where it struck the paddle, he ensured that the graphic was curved.

== Reception ==
Clean Sweep was released in April 1974 to positive reception in the coin-op industry. Ramtek highlighted the game's similar features to pinball in their advertising of the game to distributors. President of Ramtek Charles McEwan noted the game entered a second production run due to distributor demand. Ralph Baer's figures for coin-operated video game sales compiled in 1976 claim the game sold 3,500 units. (Note: Ralph Baer's numbers compiled in April 1976 are mostly estimates without direct access to sales figures.)

Ramtek expanded on the idea of a ball-and-paddle game featuring obstacles on the playfield with a game called Knockout, featuring more pinball-like elements and field tested a few months after the release of Clean Sweep. The game TV Flipper – developed by Ramtek but released by Midway Mfg – appeared later that year. (Note: It is assumed that Knockout became TV Flipper but there is little evidence either way.) After the completion of Clean Sweep, Howell Ivy started work on an idea which eventually evolved into Circus, released by Exidy.

Sega Enterprises Ltd. released a clone of Clean Sweep called Erase in Japan in 1975 and Taito released a game called Clean Sweep 2 in 1977. Clean Sweep became a topic of discussion for game developers at Atari Inc. when brought up in a brainstorming session in January 1975. One idea proposed was, “Clean Sweep (with the addition of the fact that the areas you knock out create a completely closed field at the start of the game)”. This has been identified as the origin point for the highly successful game Breakout.
