= Qwak! =

1974 video game

- North American arcade flyer
- Developer: Cyan Engineering
- Publishers: NA: Atari; JP: Namco
- Designer: Ron Milner
- Platform: Arcade
- Release: NA: November 1974; JP: July 1975
- Genre: Light gun shooter
- Mode: Single-player

Qwak! is a 1974 light gun shooter video game developed by Cyan Engineering and published by Atari for arcades. In the game, ducks fly one at a time across the screen, and the player shoots at them using a light gun attached to the game cabinet. The player gets three shots per duck; ducks change direction away from missed shots, and fall to the bottom of the screen when hit. A screen overlay adds images of reeds and a tree branch, and an image of a duck is added to a row at the top of the screen whenever a duck is hit. Games continue until a time limit, set by the machine operator, is reached.

Development of Qwak! began in 1974, finishing in November. It was presented at the November 1974 Music Operators of America (MOA) Music & Amusement Machines Exposition for release that month. The game was not commercially successful; according to Ralph H. Baer, approximately 250 units were sold. A two-player electro-mechanical clone game by U.S. Billiards, Duck Shooting, was produced around the same time, and Qwak! has been suggested as a possible inspiration for the 1984 Nintendo Entertainment System light gun game Duck Hunt.

== Gameplay ==
Qwak! is a duck hunting arcade game in which the player uses a rifle-shaped light gun to fire at targets on the screen. One duck at a time flies across the screen, with each duck appearing in a different place on the sides of the screen and flying in different paths. The player is allowed three shots to hit the duck as it flies across the screen. As with other light gun games, a hit is registered if the gun is pointed at the duck or similar light source when the trigger is pulled; no projectile is fired. When a shot is fired, a mark appears on the screen where the player was aiming; if the shot misses the duck, it changes direction away from the bullet. If the player hits a duck, it falls to the ground, and a hunting dog runs over and collects it. Each duck hit adds a small image of a duck to a row at the top of the screen. A screen overlay shows an image of marsh reeds and a tree branch. The gun is attached to the game cabinet by a metal cord, and is holstered in a small circular recess in the cabinet when not in use. Attempting to remove the gun sounds an alarm buzzer. Each game costs a quarter, and runs until the time limit runs out. Machines have adjustable time limits or can be set to run each game indefinitely, starting the score count over when the start button is pressed.

== Development ==
The game was developed for Atari by their Cyan Engineering subsidiary, recently purchased in 1973. The earliest schematics in the service manual are from June 1974, and the last is from November. Ron Milner was the principle designer. The schematics bear the logos of both Atari and Kee Games, a subsidiary company established by Atari in 1973 to reach more distributors, and which was merged with Atari in September 1974. The game was announced and shown at the Music Operators of America (MOA) Music & Amusement Machines Exposition on November 1–3, for release that month. It was then first advertised in the December 7 issue of Cash Box, the trade magazine for the amusement arcade industry.

Qwak! was released in a standard upright arcade cabinet with a black and white raster television monitor inset, with the rifle holster and start button below as the only controls. The reeds and tree branch overlay is screen printed in color onto a clear panel in front of the monitor, and is backlit by the screen; the screen is lit with a gray background instead of a black one in order to produce this effect. When the gun is triggered, the duck additionally flashes white briefly, so as to be detected by the light gun; the relative brightness of the screen makes this effect less obvious than with other similar light gun games. Qwak! was one of the earliest light gun video games, preceded by Sega's arcade video game Balloon Gun in August 1974 and a set of games for the Magnavox Odyssey video game console in 1972. In turn, they were preceded by light gun electro-mechanical games in arcades since the Ray-O-Lite Rifle Range in 1934.

== Legacy ==
Qwak! did not perform well commercially; according to Ralph H. Baer in his book Videogames: In the Beginning, approximately 250 units were sold. On November 16, 1974, U.S. Billiards announced in Cash Box magazine a two-player electro-mechanical clone game titled Duck Shooting, featuring a projected seven foot by seven foot screen instead of a monitor, and allowing two players to shoot at multiple ducks simultaneously.

In 1982, Atari developed a prototype for a touch-screen duck-themed game similarly titled Qwak. With the goal of "help[ing] mama duck and her three ducklings get home safely", the player shifts picture blocks into place to create a safe path for the ducks to get home. The player's score in the 15 levels is determined by how long the ducks are on-screen and by how many get home safely.

Critics have noted the similarity between Qwak! and the 1984 Nintendo Entertainment System light gun game Duck Hunt. Nintendo used that similarity in a 1986 court case attempting to invalidate a patent held by Sanders Associates. The patent, filed by Ralph Baer, was for the light gun peripheral used in the Magnavox Odyssey game and was held to be infringed on by Duck Hunt. Nintendo unsuccessfully claimed that Baer had based his patent not only on the Odyssey work but also on Qwak! as seen by him at the 1974 MOA show.
