= The American Revolution: 1775–1783 =

Board wargame published in 1972

Second edition with artwork by Alonzo Chappel

The American Revolution: 1775–1783 is a board wargame published by Simulations Publications Inc. (SPI) in 1972 that is a strategic simulation of the American Revolutionary War.

== Description ==
The American Revolution is a two-player game in which one player controls British forces, and the other player controls the Continental Army under George Washington.

=== Components ===
The game box contains:

- 17" x 22" paper area movement map
- 255 die-cut counters
- 9-page rulebook
- errata sheet
- a six-sided die

=== Scenarios ===
In addition to the historical scenario, the game includes twelve non-historical "what-if" scenarios.

=== Gameplay ===
American Revolution covers the entire war, with four seasonal four moves to a year, from Spring 1775 to Winter 1783. Unless one of the players achieves their victory conditions early, the games lasts for 32 turns. The game uses an "I Go, You Go" system, where each player has a Movement phase, Overseas Reinforcement phase, Combat phase, and Fortification phase. After both players have finished their turn, there is a Continental Levy phase. During winter turns, there is an attrition phase. To simulate the poor leadership of the British generals, the British player must roll 3–6 on a die before moving any unit. If the roll is a 1 or a 2, the unit does not move.

== Publication history ==
The American Revolution was designed by Jim Dunnigan, with graphic design by Redmond A. Simonsen. It was originally published by SPI in 1972 in a white box with the title in a red stripe; later the same year the game was released in a box with artwork by Alonzo Chappel.

== Reception ==
In his 1977 book The Comprehensive Guide to Board Wargaming, Nicholas Palmer thought the game was unbalanced in favor of the Americans, saying "'Idiocy rules' hamper the British commander to avoid anti-historical brilliance on his part, unbalancing the game."

In Issue 11 of Moves (October–November 1973), Martin Campion disagreed with Palmer and called the game fatally unbalanced in favor of the British, saying, "most of the task of the American player is rather dull, since most of the time the only thing he can do is get out of the way [...] The only chance the Americans have is to avoid all battles involving Continentals until near the end of the game." Seven years later, Campion moderated his opinion after using the game in his classroom with a few rule changes. He concluded, "The game as designed is a fair representation of the strategic problems of the war."

In Issue 8 of Phoenix, Paul Hirst compared American Revolution to 1776 by Avalon Hill, and concluded, "both games achieve a realistic simulation of the revolutionary war. Both however, are less than complete [...] For simplicity and overall strategic clarity, American Revolution is the winner."

== Other reviews and commentary ==
- Fire & Movement No. 75
- Campaign No. 76
- Outposts No. 7
- The Wargamer Vol 1 No. 17
