= 1776 (boardgame) =

1974 board game

- 1st edition box cover
- Publication: 1974
- Genres: strategy
- Players: 2
- Playing time: 120 minutes

1776, subtitled "The Game of the American Revolutionary War", is a board wargame published by Avalon Hill in 1974 that simulates the American Revolutionary War. Its release was timed to coincide with the bicentenary of the Revolution, and for several years was a bestseller for Avalon Hill.

== Description ==
1776 is a two-player wargame that contains elements of both strategy and tactical combat. It contains a campaign game plus four scenarios covering the invasion of Canada, the Saratoga campaign, Greene's Southern campaign, and the Yorktown campaign.

=== Components ===
The first edition game box contains:

- 16 in × 44 in (41 cm × 112 cm) mounted hex grid map of colonial America from Quebec to Georgia
- 416 die-cut counters
- two sets of combat cards and several other player aids
- 32-page rulebook
- six-sided die

=== Gameplay ===
There are three levels of rules included: Basic, Advanced and Campaign.

In all levels of the game, attacking units must move into the same hex as the enemy unit in order to initiate an attack. This combat lasts as long as both sides wish to engage. If one side disengages, the other side has an opportunity to follow-up and attack, even if it is the attacker who is retreating and the defender who is following up. As Games & Puzzles noted, "Consequently, attacks should not be embarked upon lightly." Supply units must be in the same hex as a unit attacking or defending, otherwise all Combat factors are halved.

In the Advanced and Campaign games, each player has eight Tactical cards which have various strategies on them such as "Frontal Assault" or "Enfilade Left". During combat, each player chooses and reveals one; the results are cross-referenced on a table to reveal the result of the combat that round.

=== Scenarios ===
There are four scenarios included in the game: 1775, 1777, 1780 and 1781. (As Games & Puzzles pointed out, "the reason for calling the game 1776 is not quite clear."

== Publication history ==
1776 was designed by Randell Reed and published by Avalon Hill in 1974 with artwork by Reed, Scott Moores, and Thomas N. Shaw. With interest in the Revolutionary War heightened by the approaching bicentennial, the game sold well for several years, although sales fell off as interest in the bicentennial waned.

== Reception ==
In Issue 29 of Games & Puzzles, the game review panel noted that this was six games in one box: the Basic game, the four Advanced scenarios, and the overall Campaign game. The panel awarded the game an above-average rating of 5 out of 6, saying, "For those who enjoy this form of activity, this game has a great deal to offer."

In Issue 8 of Phoenix, Paul Hirst compared 1776 to The American Revolution: 1775-1783 by Simulations Publications Inc., and concluded, "both games achieve a realistic simulation of the revolutionary war. Both however, are less than complete [...] For simplicity and overall strategic clarity, American Revolution is the winner. For a detailed involved game, with tactical overtones 1776 is superior."

In his 1977 book The Comprehensive Guide to Board Wargaming, Nicholas Palmer also compared 1776 to SPI's The American Revolution: 1775-1783, and noted that in a poll of wargames taken the previous year, 1776 had been considerably more popular than its rival. Palmer also noted that "1776 is certainly very much more complicated [...] A fine game requiring time, enthusiasm and concentration; definitely not for beginners." Palmer concluded that the game was unbalanced in favor of the British, saying, "if the players find the British winning too often, they should adjust the rules to cut down such unhistorical delights."

In The Guide to Simulations/Games for Education and Training, Martin Campion commented on his experiences with this game in the classroom, saying, "I used the short games and the long games in my 'War' course. The students were content with the limited accuracy of the short games, but they severely criticized the long game as being too tricky and too unrealistic with its allowing perfect coordination on the British side." Campion concluded, "In general, the long game is too detailed and too long for class play."

In the 1980 book The Complete Book of Wargames, game designer Jon Freeman noted that "When this game first appeared, it was widely criticized and generally disregarded. However, unlike most other games, 1776 has improved with age. The secret is to only play the Campaign Game with most of the optional rules." Freeman concluded, "The shorter scenarios simply don't do justice to the game; most are silly. The campaign, however, deserves more recognition than it has received."

== Other recognition ==
A copy of 1776 is held in the collection of the Strong National Museum of Play (object 112.6185).

== Other reviews and commentary ==
- Boardgamer Vol.1 #2 and Vol.6 #4
- Campaign #71
- Fire & Movement #75
- Moves #6
- Outposts #7
- Panzerfaust #63 and #64
- Panzerfaust and Campaign #71 & #73
- Paper Wars #35
- Strategy & Tactics #34
- The Wargamer Vol.1 #17
