= Dominos (video game) =

1977 video game

- Arcade flyer
- Developer: Atari, Inc.
- Publishers: Atari, Inc.
- Programmer: Dennis Koble
- Artist: Lyle Rains
- Platform: Arcade
- Release: January 1977
- Genre: Snake
- Modes: Single-player, multiplayer

Dominos is a 1977 snake video game developed and published by Atari, Inc. for arcades. The game comes in two versions: the first, packaged in its own distinctive, upright cabinet, is designed for one or two players, while the other version (titled as Dominos/4), with its own dedicated arcade cabinet, is designed for either one, two, three, or four players.

== Gameplay ==
Each of the two players controls one of the arrows on the screen.

Four players version (with its own dedicated arcade cabinet) aside from the two players version

Gameplay is a variation of the snake genre, in which players compete by surrounding each other with lines of dominos. Players change direction via a set of four buttons representing up, down, right, and left respectively. A player loses when they hit a wall, their own dominos, or their opponent's, at which point all the dominos in their line "fall" down. A point is awarded to the winner of each round until the end point goal is reached. The point goal can be 3, 4, 5, or 6 points.

== Development ==
Dominos was programmed by Dennis Koble. He had joined Atari in 1976 and was only the fourth programmer at the company. His first project was Sprint 2 (1976) made with Lyle Rains and Dan Van Elderen. Koble stated that despite being credited as the programmer on Dominos, Rains was "the brains behind the game" and had suggested the concept, drew the graphics and created the AI for the computer-controlled opponent.

Following the release of Blockade by Gremlin Industries, Atari wanted to make their own version of the game. Koble said the game was not stolen from Blockade, stating that prior to Gremlin's release, he had seen similar snake video games on ARPANET and CompuServe, which made him believe he was not copying Gremlin's game. Among the additions made to the game, Koble included a computer-controlled opponent, which meant that a single-player mode was possible.

Koble claimed that the game was made in a short amount of time, estimating it took about 13 weeks to complete. He recalled that the game was created when Atari was still a "young company and just trying to survive as they made the transition into using microprocessors. They didn't quite have the standards they developed later".

== Release and reception ==
Dominos was shipped in January 1977. Following Dominos, Koble went on to program Avalanche, his final game for Atari. Atari would shortly release another snake game, Surround for the Atari 2600 in September 1977.

From retrospective reviews, Bret Alan Weiss wrote in Allgame that Dominos was a simplistic game in terms of both visuals and gameplay and that it was superior as a two-player game, but it was "more fun than it looks, which isn't saying much".
