= Friedland 1807 =

Board wargame

Friedland 1807 is a board wargame published by Imperial Games in 1974 that simulates the pivotal Battle of Friedland that pitted Russian forces against those of Napoleon I.

== Background ==
In February 1807, Russians under Count von Bennigsen and the French under Napoleon fought to a stalemate at the Battle of Eylau, and the exhausted armies withdrew to regroup. In June, von Bennigsen learned of a small force of French that had become separated from the main French army near the town of Friedland. He had his entire army cross the Alle River and attack, but the French commander resisted long enough for Napoleon to arrive with his entire army and establish numerical superiority against the Russians, pinning them against the Alle River.

== Description ==
Friedland 1807 is a two-player wargame in which one player controls the Russians and the other controls the French. The rules are based on the introductory Napoleonic board wargame Napoleon at Waterloo published by Simulations Publications Inc. in 1971. This game system uses a simple "I Go, You Go" system of alternating player turns, in which one game turn represents 30 minutes of game time. In addition, Friedland 1807 also adds rules for headquarters command, morale, reserves and artillery. The game's Combat Results Table (CRT) uses a roll of two six-sided dice resulting in a bell curve of results, instead of the linear results produced by the single six-sided die used by most wargames of the time. The battles lasts from 8 a.m. until 8 p.m. (24 turns), or until one side is eliminated or resigns.

With only 120 counters and a small hex grid map, Friedland 1807 is a relatively simple game.

== Publication history ==
Friedland 1807 was designed by Jon Baxley, and published by Imperial Games in 1974.

== Reception ==
In a 1976 poll conducted by Simulations Publications Inc. (SPI) to determine the most popular board wargames in North America, Friedland 1807 placed 80th out of 202 games.

In Issue 23 of Moves (October–November 1975), Richard Berg called Friedland 1807 "a well-produced, boxed effort." He commended the command, reserve, and artillery rules, as well as the 2–12 CRT, and concluded that it "gives the player a quick, smooth game."

In the 1977 book The Comprehensive Guide to Board Wargaming, Charles Vasey commented that Friedland 1807 resembled the simple "quadrigames" published by SPI, but noted the welcome addition of rules for leader units, and "an eminently sensible CRT." He considered the game to be "A great improvement on the Quads." He warned that for the Russian player, "the battle hinges on an early Russian victory or a careful retreat over a few bridges."

== Other reviews and commentary ==
- Moves #53, p5
