= Starguard! =

Miniatures wargame

- Designers: Michael Scott Kurtick; John McEwan
- Illustrators: C. Hards
- Publishers: McEwan Miniatures
- Publication: 1974; 51 years ago
- Genres: Miniature wargame
- Languages: English
- Players: 2
- Playing time: 120 minutes
- Website: https://www.tin-soldier.com/sgdp.html

Starguard! is a 1974 miniatures wargame created by Michael Kurtick and Jon McEwan and published by McEwan Miniatures. It is a game of tactical-level ground combat of the future. The games Star War 2250 (1975) and Orilla: 1st StarGuard Supplement (1977) were released as strategic companions to Starguard!.

== Gameplay ==
Players can play as various alien forces, each of which have different weapons and tables of organization and equipment (TOE's).

On a player's turn, they can move and fire and must choose the order these operations. Players have infantrymen, treaded vehicles, and anti-gravity vehicles with different speeds they can use to move around the model map. When firing, a die is rolled to hit the target and a "penetration roll" is made if the shot succeeds, the values of which are referenced to firing charts. There are a variety of weapons, each of which have different ranges, blast radii, damage, and effects (such as smoke).

The winner is the player who destroys all the forces of the other player.

== Publication history ==
According to Shannon Appelcline, "The Space Gamer #6 ( June/July 1976) [was] the first issue to offer up substantial articles on other publishers' games — including discussions of McEwan Miniatures' Starguard! (1974) and SPI's then-forthcoming StarSoldier (1977)."

== Reception ==
Larry Bond and Michael Mornard reviewed Starguard! in The Space Gamer No. 6. They commented that "In summary, Starguard! provides a nucleus for creating a single battle or an extended campaign. It can be played fully with the existing weaponry, or it can be expanded to include any weapon imaginable."
