= Cyan Engineering =

American computer engineering company

Cyan Engineering was an American computer engineering company located in Grass Valley, California. It was founded by Steve Mayer and Larry Emmons. The company was purchased in 1973 by Atari, Inc. and developed the Atari Video Computer System console, which was released in 1977 and renamed the Atari 2600 in November 1982. It also carried out some robotics research and development work on behalf of Atari, including the Kermit mobile robot, originally intended as a stand-alone product intended to bring a beer. The company also programmed the original "portrait style" animatronics for Chuck E. Cheese's Pizza Time Theatre pizza chain in 1977.
