= The War of the Worlds II =

- The cover of The War of the Worlds II game box
- Designers: Phil Orbanes Sr.
- Illustrators: Al Zygier
- Publishers: Rand Game Associates
- Publication: July 1974; 50 years ago
- Genres: War game
- Players: 2-3
- Playing time: 120 minutes
- Age range: 12+

The War of the Worlds II is a science fiction board wargame for 2-3 players designed by Phil Orbanes Sr. and published by Rand Game Associates in 1974 that simulates planetary conquest. In the year 2000, each player's race has simultaneously arrived at the Altair system, which contains five uninhabited resource-rich planets. The players fight for the right to own the most planets.

Although the title is nearly identical to the novel about an invasion from Mars by H.G. Wells, the two works have no connection.

== Gameplay ==
The War of the Worlds II is played on a circular grid game board with local planetary space for each of the five planets, which have their own pieces and revolve in circular orbits. Each player has three command vessels they can use to enter local planetary space and attack players, as well as a number of base, station, and interceptor pieces which can be placed openly on planets or hidden on ships.

By spending a turn, a player can use command ships to build or dismantle one base or one space station. By landing on planets with a friendly base, command ships can also replace one previously destroyed unit.

To capture a planet under another player's control, the attacker must defeat all the defender's interceptor pieces in all three rings or "tones" around a given planet and then destroy that player's bases on the planet's surface. Combat is unit-to-unit and the winner is decided by a dice roll affected by unit type and tone of the combat.

In a 3-player game, players can form an alliance, allowing a player to move the units of the other for one turn.

== Reception ==
The War of the Worlds II was not popular upon release; in a 1976 poll conducted by Simulations Publications Inc. to determine the most popular wargames in North America, it placed 198th out of 202 games. Nicholas Palmer noted in his 1977 book The Comprehensive Guide to Board Wargaming that The War of the Worlds II was an "ill-received game."

Writing for The Space Gamer Issue #3, David M. Redding thought the game was very poor and concluded, "I unloaded the game at a small fraction of its cost to a rather dense, now ex-acquaintance and he surely got less than he bargained for." Three issues later, Tony Watson re-reviewed the game, commenting that "War of the Worlds II was a good try. There was obviously a strong effort to get that sci-fi 'feel' into the game, which I feel the designer accomplished. It is unfortunate that he had to deal with a weak game."
