= Cambrai, 1917: The First Blitzkrieg =

WWI board wargame published in 1974

Original folder edition of Cambrai, 1917

Cambrai, 1917: The First Blitzkrieg is a board wargame published by Rand Game Associates in 1974 that simulates the Battle of Cambrai during the First World War.

== Background ==
By late 1917, due to the Germans' increasingly strong "defense in depth", the front line of the Western Front had remained almost unchanged for three years despite new Allied techniques and strategies designed to break through the German lines. On 20 November 1917 at Cambrai, the British tried a new technology, employing hundreds of mobile armored tanks. The assault easily forced its way through several lines of trenches. However, multiple mechanical breakdowns and the Germans' fierce counterattack using stormtrooper tactics and coordinated artillery strikes brought the British advance to a halt.

== Description ==
Cambrai, 1917 is a two-player wargame where one player controls the Allied attackers, and the other controls the German defenders. The game is not complex, having a relatively small 17" x 24" hex grid mapsheet, 72 die-cut counters and one double-sided sheet of rules. (In contrast, Game Designers' Workshop's wargame Bar-Lev, also published in 1974, has two large maps, 450 counters and two rulebooks.)

=== Gameplay ===
The game uses a traditional "I Go, You Go" alternating system of turns, where one side moves and fires, followed by the other side. The only change to this is that the British also have a "Tank Attrition Phase" added to their turn. Each full game turn represents 24 hours of game time. Instead of one Combat Results Table (CRT), the game uses four, each used at a different point in the game to simulate the British element of surprise and the German counter-attack.

== Publication history ==
Cambrai, 1917 was designed by David C. Isby, with graphic art by Al Zygler, and was published by Rand Game Associates in 1974 packaged in an LP-sized cardboard folder. Two years later, in a poll conducted by Simulations Publications Inc. to determine the most popular wargames in North America, Cambrai placed a dismal 159th out of 202 games. Game critic Nick Palmer thought this was "probably due to its relative simplicity, and partly to some rule obscurities."

In 2012, Microsoft Design Group revised and republished the game as a boxed set with cover artwork by Todd Davis. The game featured a larger map and twice as many counters as Rand's original game.

== Reception ==
In the July 1975 edition of Jagdpanther, Clifford Sayre didn't like the four separate CRTs and instead proposed a method of combining them into one "Combat Calculator".

In his 1977 book The Comprehensive Guide to Board Wargaming, Nick Palmer thought this game matched Rand's philosophy of gaming, saying, "Simple and exciting games are what Rand tries to produce, and Cambrai seems to meet the target, as well as being well-balanced."

In Issue 7 of Simulacrum, Art Kritzer called this "a two-player game of low complexity that will easily allow two or three games in an evening." However, Kritzer noted, "The game is great as a diversion but not so great for repeated play. This game cries out for more detail and more units. A typical turn will see the German and British commanders moving and fighting with less than a dozen units. After a few games, the action becomes too predictable.
