= Lee vs. Meade =

Board wargame

RGA's original LP album packaging, 1974

Lee vs. Meade, subtitled "The Battle of Gettysburg", is a board wargame published by Rand Game Associates (RGA) in 1974 that simulates the Battle of Gettysburg during the American Civil War.

== Description ==
Lee vs. Meade is a two-player grand tactical wargame in which one player takes the role of Confederate general Robert E. Lee, and the other takes the role of Union general George Meade.

=== Components ===
The game box contains:

- 17" x 25" paper square-grid map scaled at 0.5 mi (0.8 km) per square
- 72 die-cut counters
- rule booklet
- various charts and player aids
- 12 TAC cards
- small six-sided die

=== Gameplay ===
The game uses an alternating "I Go, You Go" system, where the Confederate player moves and fires, then the Union player has the same opportunity. A complete turn represents one hour of game time.

==== Movement ====
The map is divided into a 12 x 12 grid (144 squares). The movement costs to move from one square into the next (including diagonally) are marked on the map.

==== Combat ====
When one unit moves into an opposing unit's square, the attacker chooses one of six TAC cards, and the defender does the same. The two cards are cross-referenced on a chart; this and a die roll determines a combat result.

=== Scenarios ===
There are five scenarios provided: the entire battle (41 turns); or four shorter scenarios representing a part of the overall battle.

=== Victory conditions ===
Both player accumulate victory points for eliminating enemy units, and for achieving certain geographical objectives.

The Gamut of Games boxed edition, 1975

== Publication history ==
Rather than selling individual games in stores or via mail-order, RGA decided to sell a series of wargames via subscription. Players who subscribed to the series titled "Command Series, Volume I" received the first game as well as a large box with enough room to store the entire series of games. A "Universal Command Series Package" was also included that contained a Universal Turn Recorder (a turn record track for up to 30 turns), TAC Cards (6 white cards and 6 red cards numbered from 1–6), and a six-sided die. Subsequent games then arrived every six weeks. Lee vs. Meade was the first game in this subscription series, a wargame designed by David Isby, and published by RGA in 1974 packaged in an "LP album". In all, RGA would publish nine games in the series.

Just after Lee vs. Meade was released, RGA made a deal with Gamut of Games, allowing the second company to sell the individual games in this series as separate boxed sets. Gamut of Games' edition of Lee vs. Meade was released in 1975.

== Reception ==
In Issue 28 of the UK magazine Games & Puzzles, John Humphries noted an issue with one of the scenarios: reinforcements brought on for the last turn can't reach the fighting in time. Humphries also found the game unbalanced in favor of the Union, saying, "for whilst he [the Union player] has a large number of weaker units, the Confederate has fewer, stronger ones, and may be forced to lose an eight for a two in any exchange, which is somewhat unrealistic."

In the February 1976 edition of Airfix Magazine, Bruce Quarrie thought that both the combat matrix and the square grid map were "clever ideas." He concluded, "Lee Vs Meade is a well-made, fast-moving game ideal for newcomers to the field of conflict simulations."

In a 1976 poll conducted by Simulations Publications Inc. to determine the most popular board wargames in North America, Lee vs. Meade placed a dismal 186th out of 202 games. In his 1977 book The Comprehensive Guide to Board Wargaming, Nicholas Palmer expressed some surprise at the game's unpopularity, saying, "Low rating perhaps caused by the unfamiliar movement system, rated 195th for no very obvious reason."

In Issue 17 of Moves (October–November 1974), Richard Berg was impressed by the game components, calling the counters "unquestionably the finest available, sturdy and handsome, with rounded edges for easy handling." But although he found the new movement system "interesting", he felt the game was a bit of a bore, saying it "has all the frantic action of the last hours of a 1925 dance marathon (zzzz)." Berg felt that "the overall strengths of the two sides are so equal that there is almost no incentive to combat [...] The result is a game where the balance is so 'good' that it is bad." He also felt the addition of a combat strategy matrix "only succeeds in adding a sham feeling of intricacy." Berg concluded, "In an effort to achieve simplicity the designer has designed all the strategic options out of the game, leaving the gamer with stereotyped, vapid playability. In light of the care put into the packaging and thought in design put into this game, the results are frustratingly banal."

== Reviews ==
- Panzerfaust Magazine #63
