= Ramtek Corporation =

American electronics manufacturer

- Company type: Defunct
- Industry: Electronics
- Founded: September 4, 1971; 54 years ago in Palo Alto, California, United States
- Founders: Charles McEwan, John Metzler, Jack Teeters
- Defunct: April 15, 1996; 30 years ago
- Fate: Dissolution
- Products: Digital displays; Video games

Ramtek Corporation was a California-based manufacturer of computer display terminals founded in 1971. Co-founders Charles E. McEwan and John W. Metzler had previously worked together at the computer graphics division of Data Disc, Inc., and founded Ramtek to create devices for displaying information from computer systems. Their major business was in medical monitors, as well as creating high-end graphical terminals for industrial and academic use. In 1973, they became one of the earliest manufacturers of video games, and manufactured coin-operated games until 1979. They became a publicly traded company starting in 1979. In 1981, it was reported Ramtek was the top company in the field of raster graphics display terminals.

== History ==
Ramtek Corporation was founded on September 4, 1971 by engineers Charles McEwan (1935-2006) and John Metzler (1935-1982) as well as lawyer Jack Teeters. The two engineers were veterans of the Western Design Labs (WDL) division of Philco-Ford as well as the video terminal division of Data Disc, Inc. Seeking to capitalize on the growing market for digital CRT displays, they established Ramtek at 1000 Elwell Court in Palo Alto, California. The company recruited other members of the Data Disc terminal business to join them as well as Charles' brother Melvin McEwan. They introduced their first two commercial products, the GX-100 and GX-200 raster terminals in early 1972. They entered the medical field due to the interest of Johns Hopkins University, creating a medical diagnostic device which utilized scintillation cameras to provide medical imaging.

Despite the growth of the computer graphics market in the early 1970s, Ramtek initially found it difficult to survive off of contracts from high-end corporations. Payment for high-end graphic terminals was frequently on terms of 90 or 120 days until payment, leaving the company undercapitalized. The company attempted expansion into lower scale markets with black and white visual displays and they acquired venture capital from the likes of Exxon, but found their break in the coin-operated video game industry. Friend of Charles McEwan and later Ramtek CFO Tom Adams was co-owner of Sunnyvale bar Andy Capp's Tavern, where the video game Pong was first location tested by Atari. A group of Ramtek engineers including Pete Kauffman played the game at this location and were convinced that it would be lucrative to create electronic games for the coin-operated market. Charles McEwan also later claimed to have known Atari co-founder Nolan Bushnell who approved of the competition.

John Metzler headed the development of Ramtek's first game, Volly, a variant of Pong released in the first wave of commercial video games in March 1973. Ramtek contacted local coin-op distributors in California and found an enthusiastic partner in Rowe International who ordered 2,500 Volly cabinets. (Note: Ralph Baer estimated the sales of Volly to be just 1,000 units.) With two subsequent games in the same vein, Hockey and Soccer, the company firmly established itself in the nascent market for video games. While maintaining their graphics terminal business, the company threw its weight behind the coin-operated industry including a partnership in Canada. (Note: Volly Industries Inc. was a Canadian company that exclusively distributed Ramtek video games in Canada. While an official connection has not been verified, a partnership is likely.)

The company's success with video games brought several changes. Pete Kauffman left the company in late 1973 to start his own video game manufacturer, Exidy Inc., who later recruited many former Ramtek engineers including co-founder John Metzler and Howell Ivy, who created games such as Clean Sweep (1974) and Baseball (1974). Baseball initially caused problems for the growing production line as the weight of the circuit boards caused the supports inside to break. Once the game was licensed to Midway Mfg. and retooled as Ball Park (1975), it became a hit for the company.

Starting in 1974, Ramtek began to seriously explore the potential of microprocessor devices. An internal team assisted by consultant Ray Holt created a prototype pinball machine called Lucky Dice based on the Intel 4040 microprocessor. The machine failed to function properly and despite a closed door showing was never released. In 1975 Ramtek purchased the company Micro Machines from Larry Krummel and commercialized the MM 80, an in-circuit emulator of the Intel 8080 microprocessor for development purposes. Their first microprocessor-based video game, Trivia (1975), became the basis for an early shared hardware platform for arcade game releases. Subsequently, Ramtek started building their graphics terminals with integrated microprocessors and began an internal software group.

In November 1975, Ramtek's main facility at 290 Commercial Ave. in Sunnyvale caught fire and damaged a significant portion of their manufacturing facilities. A collective effort by around ninety Ramtek employees and their families helped to clear the rubble of the facility, enabling them to build a temporary manufacturing plant to meet orders on their graphics display monitors. Around mid-1976, the company relocated to a new facility on 585 N Mary Ave. in Sunnyvale. In 1977, Ramtek monitors were used by Bendix in their work on the Viking space program and later by UCSC professor Ralph Abraham on an advanced mathematical project.

Though Ramtek remained very successful in the coin-operated video game market, with 10,000 units sold in their first year and a half of operation and 20,000 in its first three years making them one of the most successful video game companies of the time, they did not enjoy the volatility of the business. They branched out into electro-mechanical games starting with Horoscope (1976) and continued to compete in video games. Though their non-video game output became more elaborate and advanced with games like Boom Ball (1977) and GT Roadster (1979), they fell behind in the video game market which became more competitive and technology-driven in the latter years of the 1970s.

After a successful public offering in 1978, Ramtek decided to cease production of coin-operated games in 1979 at the urging of their shareholders. Their amusement assets were spun off as Rainbow Games and purchased in 1980 by Meltec, a company created by Mel McEwan, brother of Ramtek co-founder Charles McEwan. Meltec took over the Commercial Street facility as well as the manufacturing and distribution of Boom Ball which became popular for amusement fairs. Meltec continued until 2003 when it was sold to Bay Tek Games.

Once publicly traded, Ramtek devoted itself entirely to its high-end computer graphics market. In 1980 the company switched its primary mode of graphics display from vector to raster. It purchased assets from Omtron Electronics Inc. revolving around display terminals for $1.6 million in 1979. In 1980 it signed a deal with Ikegami Tsushinki to sell Ramtek products in Japan. Loral Corp. announced intentions to acquire Ramtek in 1981, but ultimately called off the deal. In 1982, they minted a deal with Digital Equipment Corporation to sell graphics systems based on their VAX line of computers. They likewise signed an OEM deal with Control Data Corporation to provide components for their workstation line.

The company's focus on the high-end business market led them not to participate in the microcomputer boom of the early 1980s. They did create a few standalone systems such as the 6114, but they did not create any technology targeted at home users. In 1983 Ramtek was sued for allegedly falsely evaluating their stock during a public stock offering to raise capital. Ramtek predicted revenues of $150 million in 1984. However, they instead reported a $15.4 million loss for that fiscal year. In 1984, Control Data Corporation entered an agreement with Ramtek to provide it a loan of $5 million. Under this agreement, CDC had the right to purchase a 60% share of Ramtek or buy out the company's interest in Digital Productions after two years. The Digital Productions stock and their Cray supercomputer were later sold to Omnibus Computer Graphics for $1.2 million in shares.

Layoffs hit the company at the end of 1985 and the following year Ramtek worked out a deal with the SEC to establish a public offering to repay debt. After a significant restatement in 1988, Charles McEwan was moved from CEO and President to Chairman of the corporation. Former Vice President and General Counsel James Swanson took his position as President and later that year announced the company was entering Chapter 11 bankruptcy. They managed to escape bankruptcy protection in 1989 and posted a profit in early 1990. The end of that year, they purchased the English company GEMS, who had an interest in satellite data.

Two of Ramtek's officers - Thomas Adams and G. William Theriault - were accused of falsifying the company's revenue between September 1986 to March 1988 through fictitious purchase agreements. The two agreed to a permanent injunction by the SEC, without denial or admittance of guilt. Ramtek subsequently dissolved in 1996.

== Legacy ==
As one of the earliest companies involved in video games, Ramtek were important pioneers in shaping the technology of the video game industry. Among their influential games include Clean Sweep (1974) which presaged Atari's Breakout (1976), Knockout (1974) that started the ball-and-paddle pinball craze, Baseball (1974) one of the earliest video games with articulated human characters, and Trivia (1975) the first video game quiz machine.

Several employees from Ramtek went on to join Exidy, one of the most consequential early game developers of the 1970s.

Ramtek's RM-3300 terminal appeared in the television show Buck Rogers in the 25th Century.

== Products ==
=== Graphics Display Terminals ===
==== GX series ====
- GX-100 (April 1972)
- GX-200 (April 1972)
- GX-300 (1972)
- GX-1000 (June 1973)

==== FS Series ====
- FS-2000 (June 1974)
- FS-2500 (1979)

==== RM 9000 Series ====
- RM-9000 (July 1976)
- RM-9050 (June 1978)
- RM-9100 (September 1976)
- RM-9150 (1978)
- RM-9200 (1977)
- RM-9202 (1978)
- RM-9250
- RM-9300 (1977)
- RM-9350
- RM-9351
- RM-9400 (April 1979)

==== RM 3000 Series ====
- RM-3000
- RM-3100
- RM-3150
- RM-3200
- RM-3202
- RM-3250
- RM-3300
- RM-3350
- RM-3351

=== 6000 series graphics computer family ===
- 6114 Color-graphic Computer (1979)
- 6214 Color-graphic Computer (1980) with 16 displayable colors from a palette of 64 and using UCSD Pascal. It uses a 4 MHz Zilog Z80 CPU, 64 kB RAM and a floppy disk drive, with a base price of $19,250
- 2020-4228 CAD workstation (1985) with 750 kB RAM (expandable to 5 MB) and a base price of $10,995

=== Terminals ===
- GM-613
- GM-619
- GM-301
- GM 850
- GM 870
- GM 865C
- GM 713
- GM 714
- GM 719
- 8100
- 8400
- 6000 Series Micrographic Terminal
- 6110 Colorgraphics
- 6200A (also known as the 6831)
- 6310 Colorgraphics
- 6114 Colorgraphic Computer, the black & white version was designated the 6113
- 6214 Colorgraphic
- Ramtek 8410
- Ramtek Model 8210 interactive data entry terminal – compatible with UNIVAC computers
- 8025
- RM-6212 Colorgraphic

=== Other products ===
- Ramtek 3000
- Ramtek 9000 Series Display Controller
- Ramtek 9050 Series Display Controller

=== Microcomputer Utilities ===
- MM 80 (1975), Intel 8080 in-circuit emulator.
- MM 80-211 (1976), ROM programmer addon to the MM80.

=== Computer Peripherals ===
- Model 4100 a four color printer
- 8910 a 300 baud modem

=== Software ===
- GRAPHPRO

=== Coin-Operated Games ===
==== Arcade video games ====
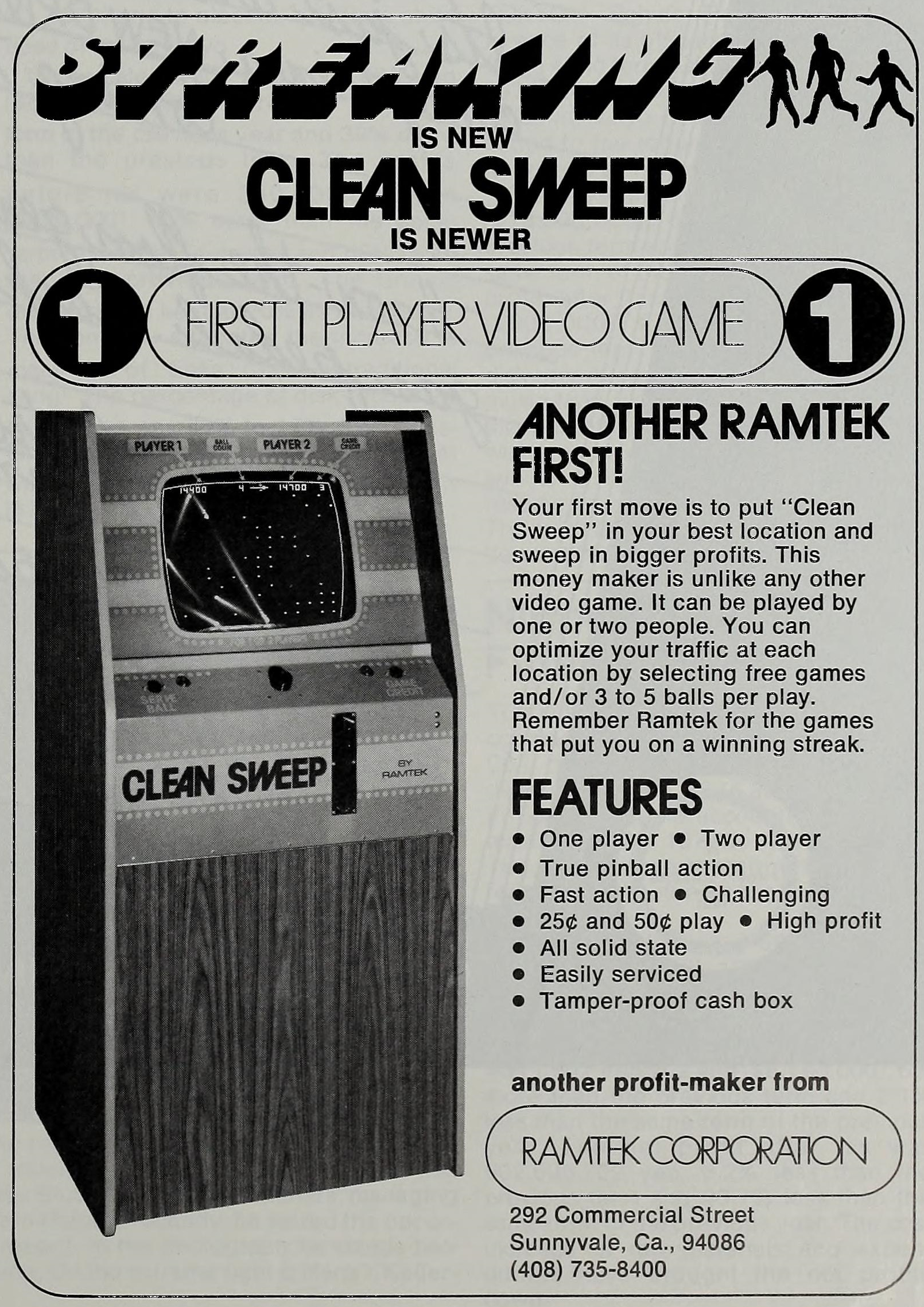
Trade advertisement from Cash Box for Clean Sweep

- Volly (March 1973)
- Hockey (September 1973)
- Soccer (December 1973)
- Wipe Out (February 1974)
- Clean Sweep (May 1974)
- Baseball (October 1974)
- Knockout (1974) – Unreleased
- Deluxe Baseball (July 1975)
- Trivia (October 1975)
- Sea Battle (April 1976)
- Hit Me (May 1976)
- Barricade (January 1977)
- M-79 Ambush (June 1977)
- Star Cruiser (September 1977)

==== Electro-mechanical Games ====
- Horoscope (October 1976)
- Lie Detector (1976) – Unreleased
- Boom Ball (November 1977)
- Dark Invader (August 1978)
- Test Driver (1978) – Unreleased
- GT Roadster (February 1979)
