= Meadows Games =

Manufacturer of coin-operated video games

Meadows Games was a developer and manufacturer of coin-operated video games established by Harry Kurek as a subsidiary of his contract manufacturing company, Meadows Manufacturing, in 1974. Kurek established the company because he felt the economy of the United States was headed into a recession and he wanted to enter a business he felt would be "recession proof". The company scored a major hit with its 1974 release Flim-Flam, a cocktail-table ball-and-paddle game that sold over 12,000 units. Subsequent games were not as successful, and Kurek sold the company to Holosonics in 1978. Holosonics closed the company down the next year.

== Games ==
- 3-D Bowling (1978)
- Bigfoot Bonkers (1976)
- Bombs Away (1976)
- Ckidzo (1976)
- Cobra Gunship (1976)
- Deadeye (1978)
- Drop Zone 4 (1975)
- Flim-Flam (1974)
- Flim Flam II (1975)
- Gridiron (1979)
- Gypsy Juggler (1978)
- Inferno (1978)
- Lazer Command (1976)
- Meadows 4 In 1 (1976)
- Meadows Lanes (1977)
