= List of Atari, Inc. games (1972–1984) =

Video games by developer/publisher

Atari, Inc. was an American video game developer and video game console and home computer development company which operated between 1972 and 1984. During its years of operation, it developed and produced over 350 arcade, console, and computer games for its own systems, and almost 100 ports of games for home computers such as the Commodore 64. Atari began its operations by developing and producing some of the first arcade video games; the first commercial arcade video game, Computer Space, was released in November 1971 by Atari founders Nolan Bushnell and Ted Dabney in partnership as Syzygy Engineering. The game in part marked the end of the early history of video games and the start of the rise of the commercial video game industry. After its founding in 1972, Atari released Pong, believed to be the third arcade video game after Computer Space and a clone game and the first commercially successful arcade video game machine, and thereafter produced numerous arcade games, including video games and pinball machines.

The arcade game market is split into manufacturers, distributors, and operators; manufacturers like Atari sell game machines to distributors—who handle several types of electronic machines—who in turn sell them to the operators of locations. In the early 1970s, distributors bought games on an exclusive basis, meaning that only one distributor in each distribution region would carry products from a given arcade game manufacturer, restricting the manufacturer to only the operators that distributor sold to. In 1973 Atari set up a secret subsidiary company, Kee Games, which was intended to sell clones of Atari's games in order to reach more distributors; Kee was merged with Atari the following year. Atari itself was sold to Warner Communications in 1976 and merged with Warner's WCI Games division, keeping the name Atari, Inc.

In 1975 Atari released Home Pong, its first of several Pong-based dedicated video game consoles, and in 1977 released its first home video game console, the Atari Video Computer System (later renamed the Atari 2600). From that point onward Atari developed both arcade games and console games, and in 1979 added games for their home computers, the Atari 400 and 800. Atari produced a second home video game console in 1982, the Atari 5200, and four more home computer versions. Beginning in Summer 1981, Atari published the Atari Program Exchange, a quarterly mail-order catalog of software written for Atari computers by external developers which Atari then distributed to customers. In May 1983, Atari started the Atarisoft division, which produced ports of games by Atari and others for non-Atari home computers. In July 1984, as a result of falling sales due to the video game crash of 1983, Atari, Inc. was split apart by Warner Communications; the arcade division continued as a subsidiary of Warner under the name Atari Games, while the console and computer games divisions were sold off as Atari Corporation.

== Games ==
Atari's dedicated consoles and many of their early console games were licensed for sale through Sears, which often sold them under a different name, on some occasions months prior to the Atari-branded version. When different, these variant names are listed in the table below. When the same arcade game was released with minor variations by Atari and Kee Games, the two games are listed together.

Atari, Inc. games
Title	System	Release date	Developer(s) (Note: The original developer of the game, rather than the developer of a specific port of the game)	Ref(s).
Pong	Arcade	November 29, 1972	Atari	
Pong	Dedicated console (Note: The dedicated console version of Pong is commonly referred to as Home Pong, despite not bearing that name.) (Note: Initially released through Sears under the same name as the later Atari version)	October 1, 1975	Atari	
Space Race	Arcade	July 16, 1973	Atari	
Pong Doubles	Arcade	September 10, 1973	Atari	
Pong Doubles	Dedicated console (as Pong IV)	September 1976	Atari	
Gotcha	Arcade	October 1973	Atari	
Elimination	Arcade	October 1973	Kee Games	
Elimination	Arcade (as Quadrapong)	March 1974	Atari	
Rebound	Arcade	February 1974	Atari	
Rebound	Arcade (as Spike)	March 1974	Kee Games	
Super Pong	Arcade	February 1974	Atari	
Super Pong	Dedicated console	July 1976	Atari	
World Cup	Arcade	April 1974 (Note: World Cup was released solely in Europe)	Atari	
Gran Trak 10	Arcade	May 1974	Atari	
Gran Trak 10	Arcade (as Formula K)	July 1974	Kee Games	
Twin Racer	Arcade	July 1974	Kee Games	
Twin Racer	Arcade (as Gran Trak 20)	August 1974	Atari	
Touch Me	Arcade (electronic)	October 1974	Atari	
Touch Me	Handheld electronic game	Fall 1979	Atari	
Pin-Pong	Arcade	October 1974	Atari	
Qwak!	Arcade	November 1974	Atari	
Tank	Arcade	November 5, 1974	Kee Games	
Pursuit	Arcade	January 1975	Kee Games (Note: Kee Games officially merged with Atari in December 1974; Pursuit was the last game developed by Kee as a distinct company, though the brand continued to be used.)	
Hi-way	Arcade	April 1975	Atari	
Indy 800	Arcade	April 1975	Atari (Note: Released under the Kee Games brand after the company merged with Atari)	
Indy 800	Atari 2600 (as Indy 500 (Sears: Race)) (Note: 2-player console game version of the 8-player arcade game Indy 800)	September 11, 1977	Atari	
Tank II	Arcade	May 1975	Atari	
Anti-Aircraft	Arcade	June 1975	Atari	
Goal 4	Arcade	July 1975	Atari	
Shark Jaws	Arcade	September 1975	Atari (Note: Shark Jaws was the only game by Atari released under the Horror Games brand.)	
Crash 'N Score	Arcade	October 17, 1975	Atari	
Jet Fighter	Arcade	October 17, 1975	Atari	
Steeplechase	Arcade	October 17, 1975	Atari	
Steeplechase	Atari 2600	Fall 1981	Atari	
Stunt Cycle	Arcade	January 1976	Atari	
Outlaw	Arcade	March 1976	Atari	
Quiz Show	Arcade	April 1976	Atari	
Tank 8	Arcade	April 1976	Atari	
Indy 4	Arcade	May 1976	Atari	
Breakout	Arcade	May 13, 1976	Atari	
Breakout	Atari 2600 (Sears: Breakaway IV)	November 1978	Atari	
Cops n' Robbers	Arcade	July 1976	Atari	
Flyball	Arcade	July 1976	Atari	
LeMans	Arcade	August 1976	Atari	
Hockey Pong	Dedicated console	September 1976	Atari	
Super Pong Doubles	Dedicated console (Sears: Super Pong IV)	September 1976	Atari	
Night Driver	Arcade	October 1976	Atari	
Night Driver	Atari 2600	Summer 1980	Atari	
Sprint 2	Arcade	November 12, 1976	Atari	
F-1 (Note: Namco arcade game published by Atari in North America)	Arcade	November 12, 1976	Namco	
Dominos	Arcade	January 1977	Atari	
Super Pong 10	Dedicated console	February 1977	Atari	
Dominos/4	Arcade	February 6, 1977	Atari	
The Atarians	Pinball	February 18, 1977	Atari	
Triple Hunt	Arcade	April 1977	Atari	
Sprint 8	Arcade	May 1977	Atari	
Drag Race	Arcade	June 1977	Atari	
Pool Shark	Arcade	June 1977	Atari	
Time 2000	Pinball	June 1977	Atari	
Starship 1	Arcade	July 1977	Atari	
Starship 1	Atari 2600 (as Star Ship (Sears: Outer Space))	September 11, 1977	Atari	
Video Pinball	Dedicated console (Sears: Pinball Breakaway)	September 1977	Atari	
Video Pinball	Arcade	February 1979	Atari	
Video Pinball	Atari 2600	March 1981	Atari	
Airborne Avenger	Pinball	September 1977	Atari	
Super Bug	Arcade	September 1977	Atari	
Air-Sea Battle	Atari 2600 (Sears: Target Fun)	September 11, 1977	Atari	
Video Olympics	Atari 2600 (Sears: Pong Sports)	September 11, 1977	Atari	
Street Racer	Atari 2600 (Sears: Speedway II)	September 11, 1977	Atari	
Blackjack	Atari 2600	September 11, 1977	Atari	
Surround	Atari 2600 (Sears: Chase)	September 11, 1977	Atari	
Basic Math	Atari 2600 (Sears: Math)	September 11, 1977	Atari	
Combat	Atari 2600 (Sears: Tank-Plus)	September 11, 1977	Atari	
Ultra Pong	Dedicated console	October 1977	Atari	
Canyon Bomber	Arcade	November 1977	Atari	
Canyon Bomber	Atari 2600	Fall 1979	Atari	
Destroyer	Arcade	November 1977	Atari	
Ultra Pong Doubles	Dedicated console	November 1977	Atari	
Stunt Cycle	Dedicated console (Sears: Motocross Sports Center IV)	November 1977	Atari	
Sprint 4	Arcade	December 1977	Atari	
Sprint 1	Arcade	January 1978	Atari	
Middle Earth	Pinball	February 1978	Atari	
Ultra Tank	Arcade	February 1978	Atari	
Sky Raider	Arcade	March 1978	Atari	
Tournament Table	Arcade	March 1978	Atari	
Space War	Atari 2600 (Sears: Space Combat)	May 1978	Atari	
Hangman	Atari 2600 (Sears: Spelling)	May 1978	Atari	
Avalanche	Arcade	June 1978	Atari	
Avalanche	Atari 8-bit (Note: Beginning in Summer 1981, Atari published the Atari Program Exchange, a quarterly mail-order catalog of software written for Atari computers by external developers which Atari then distributed to customers.)	Summer 1981	Dennis Koble	
Fire Truck	Arcade	June 1978	Atari	
Sky Diver	Arcade	June 1978	Atari	
Home Run	Atari 2600 (Sears: Baseball)	June 1978	Atari	
Code Breaker	Atari 2600 (Sears: Codebreaker)	June 1978	Atari	
Hunt & Score	Atari 2600 (Sears: Memory Match)	June 1978	Atari	
Smokey Joe	Arcade	July 1978	Atari	
Slot Racers	Atari 2600 (Sears: Maze)	July 1978	Atari	
Brain Games	Atari 2600	August 1978	Atari	
Flag Capture	Atari 2600 (Sears: Capture)	August 1978	Atari	
Super Breakout	Arcade	August 1978	Atari	
Super Breakout	Atari 8-bit	November 1979	Atari	
Super Breakout	Atari 2600	January 1982	Atari	
Super Breakout	Atari 5200	October 1982	Atari	
Space Riders	Pinball	September 1978	Atari	
Atari Football	Arcade	October 1978	Atari	
Atari Football	Atari 2600 (as Football)	Winter 1979	Atari	
Outlaw	Atari 2600 (Sears: Gunslinger)	October 1978	Atari	
Orbit	Arcade	November 1978	Atari	
Basketball	Atari 2600	December 1978	Atari	
Sky Diver	Atari 2600 (Sears: Dare Diver)	Winter 1979	Atari	
Superman	Pinball	March 5, 1979	Atari	
Hercules	Pinball	April 1979	Atari	
Atari 4-Player Football	Arcade	April 1979	Atari	
Basketball	Arcade	May 1979	Atari	
Subs	Arcade	May 1979	Atari	
Atari Baseball	Arcade	June 1979	Atari	
Superman	Atari 2600	June 1979	Atari	
BASIC Programming	Atari 2600	July 1979	Atari	
Video Chess	Atari 2600	Summer 1979	Atari	
Backgammon	Atari 2600	Summer 1979	Atari	
Lunar Lander	Arcade	August 1979	Atari	
Bowling	Atari 2600	Fall 1979	Atari	
Casino	Atari 2600 (Sears: Poker Plus)	Fall 1979	Atari	
Human Cannonball	Atari 2600 (Sears: Cannon Man)	Fall 1979	Atari	
Miniature Golf	Atari 2600 (Sears: Arcade Golf)	Fall 1979	Atari	
Slot Machine	Atari 2600 (Sears: Slots)	Fall 1979	Atari	
Asteroids	Arcade	November 1979	Atari	
Asteroids	Atari 8-bit	Summer 1981	Atari	
Asteroids	Atari 2600	July 1981	Atari	
Basketball	Atari 8-bit	November 1979	Atari	
Adventure	Atari 2600	1980	Atari	
3-D Tic-Tac-Toe	Atari 8-bit	January 1980	Atari	
3-D Tic-Tac-Toe	Atari 2600	Summer 1980	Atari	
Star Raiders	Atari 8-bit	March 1980	Atari	
Star Raiders	Atari 2600	September 1982	Atari	
Star Raiders	Atari 5200	January 1983	Atari	
Space Invaders (Note: Console and computer game versions of the Taito arcade game)	Atari 2600	February 1980	Taito	
Space Invaders	Atari 8-bit	Summer 1980	Taito	
Space Invaders	Atari 5200	October 1982	Taito	
Atari Soccer	Arcade	April 1980	Atari	
Monte Carlo	Arcade	April 1980	Atari	
Hangman	Atari 8-bit	Spring 1980	Atari	
Kingdom	Atari 8-bit	Spring 1980	Atari	
Blackjack	Atari 8-bit	Spring 1980	Atari	
Missile Command	Arcade	June 1980	Atari	
Missile Command	Atari 2600	April 1981	Atari	
Missile Command	Atari 8-bit	Summer 1981	Atari	
Missile Command	Atari 5200	October 1982	Atari	
Circus Atari (Note: Console game version of the Exidy arcade game Circus)	Atari 2600 (Sears: Circus)	Summer 1980	Exidy	
Golf	Atari 2600	Summer 1980	Atari	
Maze Craze	Atari 2600	Fall 1980	Atari	
Video Checkers	Atari 2600	Fall 1980	Atari	
Dodge 'Em	Atari 2600	Fall 1980	Atari	
Battlezone	Arcade	November 1980	Atari	
Battlezone	Atari 2600	August 1983	Atari	
Battlezone	Apple II	Winter 1984	Atari	
Battlezone	IBM PC	Winter 1984	Atari	
Battlezone	Commodore 64	Winter 1984	Atari	
Battlezone	VIC-20	Winter 1984	Atari	
Pelé's Soccer	Atari 2600 (Sears: Soccer)	Winter 1981	Atari	
Asteroids Deluxe	Arcade	April 1981	Atari	
Warlords	Arcade	April 1981	Atari	
Warlords	Atari 2600	June 1981	Atari	
Red Baron	Arcade	May 1981	Atari	
Lemonade	Atari 8-bit	Summer 1981	Bob Polaro	
Mugwump	Atari 8-bit	Summer 1981	Bob Polaro	
Outlaw/Howitzer (Note: Computer game version of the Taito arcade game Gun Fight)	Atari 8-bit	Summer 1981	Hofacker / Elcomp Publishing	
Preschool Games	Atari 8-bit	Summer 1981	Bob Polaro	
Roman Checkers	Atari 8-bit	Summer 1981	Bob Polaro	
Space Trek	Atari 8-bit	Summer 1981	Bob Polaro	
Centurion	Atari 8-bit	Summer 1981	Robert Zdybel	
Castle	Atari 8-bit	Summer 1981	Robert Zdybel	
Wizard's Gold	Atari 8-bit	Summer 1981		
Sleazy Adventure	Atari 8-bit	Summer 1981	Bob Smith	
Alien Egg	Atari 8-bit	Summer 1981	Robert Zdybel	
Chinese Puzzle	Atari 8-bit	Summer 1981	Dennis Koble	
Sultan's Palace	Atari 8-bit	Summer 1981	Dennis Koble	
Anthill	Atari 8-bit	Summer 1981	Steve Bittrolff	
Tact Trek	Atari 8-bit	Summer 1981	Robert Zdybel	
Centipede	Arcade	June 1981	Atari	
Centipede	Atari 8-bit	June 1982	Atari	
Centipede	Atari 5200	February 1983	Atari	
Centipede	Apple II	June 1983	Atari	
Centipede	IBM PC	June 1983	Atari	
Centipede	Commodore 64	June 1983	Atari	
Centipede	VIC-20	June 1983	Atari	
Centipede	TI-99/4A	June 1983	Atari	
Centipede	ColecoVision	October 26, 1983	Atari	
Centipede	Intellivision	October 26, 1983	Atari	
Stellar Track	Atari 2600	Fall 1981	Atari	
Dice Poker	Atari 8-bit	Fall 1981	Bob Polaro	
747 Landing Simulator	Atari 8-bit	Fall 1981	William J. Graham	
Eastern Front (1941)	Atari 8-bit	Fall 1981	Chris Crawford	
CodeCracker	Atari 8-bit	Fall 1981	Jose R. Suarez	
Domination	Atari 8-bit	Fall 1981	Alan M. Newman	
Terry	Atari 8-bit	Fall 1981	Ingrid Langevin Solem	
Bumper Pool	Atari 8-bit	Fall 1981	Steve Smith	
Minotaur	Atari 8-bit	Fall 1981	Steve Cavin	
Lookahead	Atari 8-bit	Fall 1981	Dave Johnson / Johnson Software	
Babel	Atari 8-bit	Fall 1981	Joel Gluck	
Wizard's Revenge	Atari 8-bit	Fall 1981	Max Manowski	
Tempest	Arcade	October 29, 1981	Atari	
Letterman	Atari 8-bit	Winter 1982	Ed Stewart / Ray Lyons	
Mathematic-Tac-Toe	Atari 8-bit	Winter 1982	Nadav Caine	
Number Blast	Atari 8-bit	Winter 1982	Richard Wiitala	
Attank!	Atari 8-bit	Winter 1982	Joel Gluck	
Blackjack Casino	Atari 8-bit	Winter 1982	Bill Zimmerman	
Block 'Em	Atari 8-bit	Winter 1982	Jose R. Suarez	
Caverns of Mars	Atari 8-bit	Winter 1982	Greg Christensen	
Dog Daze	Atari 8-bit	Winter 1982	Gray Chang	
Downhill	Atari 8-bit	Winter 1982	Mark Reid	
Memory Match	Atari 8-bit	Winter 1982	Bruce Frumker	
Pro Bowling	Atari 8-bit	Winter 1982	Wesley B. Newell	
Reversi II	Atari 8-bit	Winter 1982	Russel Segal	
Solitaire	Atari 8-bit	Winter 1982	Mark Reid	
Space Chase	Atari 8-bit	Winter 1982	Fernando Herrera	
Haunted House	Atari 2600	February 1982	Atari	
Space Duel	Arcade	February 16, 1982	Atari	
Pac-Man (Note: Console and computer game versions of a Namco arcade game)	Atari 2600	March 16, 1982	Namco	
Pac-Man	Atari 8-bit	May 1982	Namco	
Pac-Man	Atari 5200	October 1982	Namco	
Pac-Man	Apple II	June 1983	Namco	
Pac-Man	IBM PC	June 1983	Namco	
Pac-Man	Commodore 64	June 1983	Namco	
Pac-Man	VIC-20	June 1983	Namco	
Pac-Man	TI-99/4A	June 1983	Namco	
Pac-Man	Intellivision	October 26, 1983	Namco	
Pac-Man	ZX Spectrum	Winter 1984	Namco	
Block Buster	Atari 8-bit	Spring 1982	Alan Griesemer / Stephen Bradshaw	
Dig Dug	Arcade	April 1982	Namco	
Dig Dug	Apple II	June 1983	Namco	
Dig Dug	IBM PC	June 1983	Namco	
Dig Dug	Commodore 64	June 1983	Namco	
Dig Dug	VIC-20	June 1983	Namco	
Dig Dug	TI-99/4A	June 1983	Namco	
Dig Dug	Atari 2600	October 1983	Namco	
Dig Dug	Atari 5200	October 1983	Namco	
Dig Dug	Atari 8-bit	January 1984	Namco	
Yars' Revenge	Atari 2600	May 1982	Atari	
Kangaroo	Arcade	June 1982	Sun Electronics	
Kangaroo	Atari 2600	June 1983	Sun Electronics	
Kangaroo	Atari 5200	August 1983	Sun Electronics	
Kangaroo	Atari 8-bit	Fall 1983	Sun Electronics	
Gravitar	Arcade	June 1982	Atari	
Gravitar	Atari 2600	October 1983	Atari	
Defender (Note: Console game version of the Williams Electronics arcade game)	Atari 2600	June 1982	Williams Electronics	
Defender	Atari 5200	December 1982	Williams Electronics	
Defender	Atari 8-bit	December 1982	Williams Electronics	
Defender	Apple II	June 1983	Williams Electronics	
Defender	IBM PC	June 1983	Williams Electronics	
Defender	Commodore 64	June 1983	Williams Electronics	
Defender	VIC-20	June 1983	Williams Electronics	
Defender	TI-99/4A	June 1983	Williams Electronics	
Defender	ColecoVision	October 26, 1983	Williams Electronics	
Defender	Intellivision	October 26, 1983	Williams Electronics	
Math Gran Prix	Atari 2600	July 1982	Atari; Suki Lee	
Demons to Diamonds	Atari 2600	July 1982	Atari	
Frogmaster	Atari 8-bit	Summer 1982	Michael Crick	
Checker King	Atari 8-bit	Summer 1982	William H. Northrup	
Galahad and the Holy Grail	Atari 8-bit	Summer 1982	Douglas Crockford	
Jax-O	Atari 8-bit	Summer 1982	John Oritz	
Pushover	Atari 8-bit	Summer 1982	Joel Gluck	
Rabbotz	Atari 8-bit	Summer 1982	Jeff Johannigman	
Salmon Run	Atari 8-bit	Summer 1982	Bill Williams	
Seven Card Stud	Atari 8-bit	Summer 1982	Monty Webb	
Berzerk (Note: Console version of the Stern Electronics arcade game)	Atari 2600	August 1982	Stern Electronics	
Berzerk	Atari 5200	November 1983	Stern Electronics	
Fast Freddie	Atari 2600 (Note: Kaneko arcade game published by Atari in Europe)	October 1982	Kaneko	
Galaxian	Atari 5200	October 1982	Namco	
Galaxian	Atari 8-bit	December 1982	Namco	
Galaxian	Atari 2600	April 1983	Namco	
Galaxian	ColecoVision	October 26, 1983	Namco	
Galaxian	ZX Spectrum	Winter 1984	Atari	
Galaxian	Apple II	Winter 1984	Atari	
Galaxian	IBM PC	Winter 1984	Atari	
Galaxian	Commodore 64	Winter 1984	Atari	
Galaxian	VIC-20	Winter 1984	Atari	
RealSports Soccer	Atari 5200	October 1982	Atari	
RealSports Soccer	Atari 2600	April 1983	General Computer Corporation	
RealSports Baseball	Atari 2600	October 1982	Atari	
RealSports Baseball	Atari 5200	October 1983	Atari	
RealSports Volleyball	Atari 2600	October 1982	Atari	
SwordQuest: EarthWorld	Atari 2600	October 1982	Atari	
Cribbage	Atari 8-bit	Fall 1982	Jose R. Suarez	
Mankala	Atari 8-bit	Fall 1982	Elizabeth Chase MacRae	
Snark Hunt	Atari 8-bit	Fall 1982	Jeff Johannigman	
Submarine Commander	Atari 2600	Fall 1982	Atari	
Raiders of the Lost Ark	Atari 2600	November 1982	Atari	
Millipede	Arcade	November 18, 1982	Atari	
Millipede	Atari 2600	March 1984	Atari	
Pole Position	Arcade	November 18, 1982	Namco	
Pole Position	Atari 2600	July 1983	Namco	
Pole Position	Atari 5200	August 1983	Namco	
Pole Position	Atari 8-bit	January 1984	Namco	
Pole Position	Apple II	Winter 1984	Namco	
Pole Position	IBM PC	Winter 1984	Namco	
Pole Position	Commodore 64	Winter 1984	Namco	
Pole Position	VIC-20	Winter 1984	Namco	
Pole Position	TI-99/4A	Winter 1984	Namco	
Liberator	Arcade	November 18, 1982	Atari	
Quantum	Arcade	November 18, 1982	General Computer Corporation; Elizabeth Betty Ryan	
RealSports Football	Atari 2600	December 1982	Atari	
RealSports Football	Atari 5200	December 1982	Atari	
E.T. the Extra-Terrestrial	Atari 2600	December 1982	Atari	
Vanguard	Atari 2600	January 1983	Tose	
Vanguard	Atari 5200	October 1983	Tose	
Phoenix	Atari 2600	January 1983		
Typo Attack	Atari 8-bit	Winter 1983	David Buehler	
Air-Raid!	Atari 8-bit	Winter 1983	Chuck Gibke	
Game Show	Atari 8-bit	Winter 1983	Hung A. Pham	
Gridiron Glory	Atari 8-bit	Winter 1983	Mike Drury / Bob Graves	
Melt-Down	Atari 8-bit	Winter 1983	Stephen Romejko	
Phobos	Atari 8-bit	Winter 1983	Greg Christensen	
Pushky	Atari 8-bit	Winter 1983	Yakov Epelboim	
Quarxon	Atari 8-bit	Winter 1983	Scott Ludwig	
Yahtman	Atari 8-bit	Winter 1983	Dan Reinhart	
Xevious	Arcade	February 1983	Namco	
Black Widow	Arcade	February 1983	Atari	
Ms. Pac-Man	Atari 2600	February 1983	Namco	
Ms. Pac-Man	Atari 5200	September 1983	Namco	
Ms. Pac-Man	ZX Spectrum	Winter 1984	Namco	
Ms. Pac-Man	Apple II	Winter 1984	Namco	
Ms. Pac-Man	IBM PC	Winter 1984	Namco	
Ms. Pac-Man	Commodore 64	Winter 1984	Namco	
Ms. Pac-Man	VIC-20	Winter 1984	Namco	
Ms. Pac-Man	TI-99/4A	Winter 1984	Namco	
SwordQuest: FireWorld	Atari 2600	February 1983	Atari	
Countermeasure	Atari 5200	February 1983	Atari	
Popeye (Note: Nintendo arcade game published by Atari in Europe)	Arcade	February 1983	Nintendo	
Donkey Kong (Note: Console and computer game versions of the Nintendo arcade game)	Atari 8-bit	March 1983	Nintendo	
Donkey Kong	Apple II	June 1983	Nintendo	
Donkey Kong	IBM PC	June 1983	Nintendo	
Donkey Kong	Commodore 64	June 1983	Nintendo	
Donkey Kong	VIC-20	June 1983	Nintendo	
Donkey Kong	TI-99/4A	June 1983	Nintendo	
Food Fight	Arcade	March 1983	General Computer Corporation	
Catterpiggle	Atari 8-bit	Spring 1983	Scott Ludwig	
Diggerbonk	Atari 8-bit	Spring 1983	Steve Robinson	
Getaway!	Atari 8-bit	Spring 1983	Mark Reid	
Impact	Atari 8-bit	Spring 1983	David Buehler	
Microsailing	Atari 8-bit	Spring 1983	Glenn Faden	
RealSports Tennis	Atari 2600	April 1983	General Computer Corporation	
RealSports Tennis	Atari 5200	April 1983	Atari	
Arabian	Arcade	May 1983	Sun Electronics	
Star Wars	Arcade	May 1983	Atari	
Jungle Hunt	Atari 2600	June 1983	Taito	
Jungle Hunt	Atari 5200	August 1983	Taito	
Jungle Hunt	Atari 8-bit	January 1984	Taito	
Jungle Hunt	Apple II	Winter 1984	Taito	
Jungle Hunt	IBM PC	Winter 1984	Taito	
Jungle Hunt	Commodore 64	Winter 1984	Taito	
Jungle Hunt	VIC-20	Winter 1984	Taito	
Jungle Hunt	TI-99/4A	Winter 1984	Taito	
The Bean Machine	Atari 8-bit	Summer 1983	Steve Robinson	
Bootleg	Atari 8-bit	Summer 1983	Eric Freeman	
Can't Quit	Atari 8-bit	Summer 1983	John M. Harris	
Dandy	Atari 8-bit	Summer 1983	John H. Palevich	
Ennumereight	Atari 8-bit	Summer 1983	Philip J. Baker	
Smasher	Atari 8-bit	Summer 1983	Chris Goodman / John Goodman	
Crystal Castles	Arcade	July 8, 1983	Atari	
Crystal Castles	Atari 2600	March 1984	Atari	
Atari Video Cube	Atari 2600	July 1983	Atari	
Krull	Atari 2600	September 1983	Atari	
Cookie Monster Munch	Atari 2600	September 1983	Atari / Children's Computer Workshop	
Alpha Beam with Ernie	Atari 2600	September 1983	Atari	
Space Dungeon	Atari 5200	September 1983	Atari	
The Lone Raider	Atari 8-bit	September 1983	Atari	
Ion Roadway	Atari 8-bit	Fall 1983	Jim Sommers	
Space War	Atari 8-bit	Fall 1983	Jay R. Jaeger	
Saratoga	Atari 8-bit	Fall 1983	Paul Wehner	
Moon Marauder	Atari 8-bit	Fall 1983	Jim Sommers	
Excalibur	Atari 8-bit	Fall 1983	Chris Crawford / Larry Summers / Valerie Atkinson	
Musical Pilot	Atari 8-bit	Fall 1983	Charlie Kulas	
Puzzler	Atari 8-bit	Fall 1983	Paul Lewandowski	
Ringmaster	Atari 8-bit	Fall 1983	Gregor Nowak	
Joust	Atari 2600	October 1983	Atari	
Joust	Atari 5200	October 1983	Atari	
Joust	Atari 8-bit	January 1984	Atari	
Joust	Apple II	Winter 1984	Atari	
Joust	IBM PC	Winter 1984	Atari	
Moon Patrol (Note: Console version of an Irem arcade game)	Atari 2600	October 1983	Irem	
Moon Patrol	Atari 5200	November 1983	Irem	
Moon Patrol	Apple II	Winter 1984	Irem	
Moon Patrol	IBM PC	Winter 1984	Irem	
Moon Patrol	Commodore 64	Winter 1984	Irem	
Moon Patrol	VIC-20	Winter 1984	Irem	
Moon Patrol	TI-99/4A	Winter 1984	Irem	
SwordQuest: WaterWorld	Atari 2600	October 1983	Atari	
Sorcerer's Apprentice	Atari 2600	October 1983	Atari	
Major Havoc	Arcade	November 1983	Atari	
Pole Position II	Arcade	November 1983	Atari	
Pigs in Space	Atari 2600	November 1983	Atari	
Quadrun	Atari 2600	November 1983	Atari	
Snoopy and the Red Baron	Atari 2600	November 1983	Atari	
Big Bird's Egg Catch	Atari 2600	November 1983	Atari / Children's Computer Workshop	
Mario Bros.	Atari 2600	November 1983	Nintendo	
Mario Bros.	Atari 5200	December 1983	Nintendo	
Pengo (Note: Console version of a Coreland arcade game)	Atari 5200	November 1983	Coreland	
Pengo	Atari 8-bit	January 1984	Coreland	
Pengo	Atari 2600	May 1984	Coreland	
Robotron: 2084 (Note: Console version of a Vid Kidz arcade game)	Commodore 64	June 1983	Vid Kidz	
Robotron: 2084	VIC-20	June 1983	Vid Kidz	
Robotron: 2084	Atari 5200	November 1983	Vid Kidz	
Robotron: 2084	Apple II	October 26, 1983	Vid Kidz	
Robotron: 2084	IBM PC	October 26, 1983	Vid Kidz	
Robotron: 2084	Atari 8-bit	January 1984	Vid Kidz	
Dragon's Lair (Note: Cinematronics/Advanced Microcomputer Systems arcade game published by Atari in Europe)	Arcade	1983	Advanced Microcomputer Systems	
Firefox	Arcade	January 1984	Atari	
Donkey Kong Jr.	Atari 8-bit	January 1984	Nintendo	
Bellum	Atari 8-bit	Winter 1984	Adam Michael Billyard	
Burgers!	Atari 8-bit	Winter 1984	Douglas Crockford	
Chambers of Zorp	Atari 8-bit	Winter 1984	Karl Gardner / Tom Konchan	
Dragon Quest or A Twist in the Tail	Atari 8-bit	Winter 1984	Ed Churnside	
Numberland Nightwatch	Atari 8-bit	Winter 1984	Kendall Brown	
Raid on Gravitron	Atari 8-bit	Winter 1984	Jim Sommers	
Rush Hour	Atari 8-bit	Winter 1984	Mark Odendahl / Suzy Odendahl	
Weakon	Atari 8-bit	Winter 1984	Eric Freeman	
Dog Daze Deluze	Atari 8-bit	Winter 1984	Gray Chang	
Cloak & Dagger	Arcade	February 1984	Atari	
Space Ace (Note: Cinematronics/Advanced Microcomputer Systems arcade game published by Atari in Europe)	Arcade	1984	Advanced Microcomputer Systems	
Oscar's Trash Race	Atari 2600	March 1984	Atari / Children's Computer Workshop	
Bumpomov's Dogs	Atari 8-bit	March 22, 1984	Atari	
Taz	Atari 2600	April 1984	Atari	
Asterix	Atari 2600	April 1984	Atari	
Obélix	Atari 2600	April 1984	Atari; Suki Lee	
Choplifter (Note: Console version of the Dan Gorlin Apple II game)	Atari 2600	May 1984	Dan Gorlin	
I, Robot	Arcade	June 1984	Atari	
Stargate	Apple II	June 1984	Williams Electronics	
Stargate	IBM PC	June 1984	Williams Electronics	
Stargate	Atari 2600	June 1984	Williams Electronics	
Gremlins	Atari 2600	June 1984	Atari	
Gremlins	Apple II	June 1984	Atari	
Gremlins	IBM PC	June 1984	Atari	
Gremlins	Commodore 64	June 1984	Atari	

== See also ==
- List of Atari 2600 games
- List of Atari 5200 games

== Sources ==
- Goldberg, Marty; Vendel, Curt (2012-11-25). Atari Inc.: Business Is Fun. Syzygy Press. ISBN 978-0-9855974-0-5.
