= List of Asterix games =

This is a list of Asterix games of all varieties (book, board and video). The series sold more than 5 million units by 2003.

== Gamebooks ==
- Asterix Adventure Games — a series of game books in the style of the Choose Your Own Adventure books but with some randomization by way of dice and included props. They are written by Stephen Thraves.
- # Asterix to the Rescue (1986) — rescue the captured druid from Rome.
- # Operation Britain (1987) — get mistletoe from Britain for the potion.
- # Asterix Against All Odds (1992) — circumnavigate occupied Gaul (based on Asterix and the Banquet).
- Alea jacta est! — a roleplaying system including attributes and combat. The reader plays the part of Justforkix from Asterix and the Normans in a series of scenarios moderated by the game books. It is translated by Anthea Bell and Derek Hockridge.
- # Le rendez-vous du chef (1988) — English: The Meeting of the Chieftains (1989)
- # La vedette armoricaine (1988) — English: The Idol of the Gauls (1990)
- # L'affaire des faux menhirs (1988) — English: The Roman Conspiracy (1991)
- # Le grand jeu (1988) — English: The Great Game (not translated)
- Find Asterix (1998) — a Where's Wally? clone with Asterix as the object of the search in crowded scenes from the world of 50 BC.

== Board games ==
| Title | Publisher | Year |
|---|---|---|
| Astérix et la Potion magique [Asterix and the Magic Potion] | Jeux Noel | 1970 |
| Astérix en Égypte [Asterix in Egypt] | Jeux Noel | 1971 |
| Le tour de Gaule d'Astérix | Jeux Dargaud | 1978 |
| Les Voyages D'Asterix | Jeux Dargaud | 1978 |
| Astérix et la potion magique | Jeux Nathan | 1985 |
| Asterix the Board Game | Spear Spiele | 1990 |
| Astérix et les Romains or Asterix en de Romeinen or Asterix und die Römer | Ravenburger | 1990 |
| Asterix das Kartenspiel | F.X. Schmid-Spears | 1992 |
| Astérix présente Obélix contre Hattack | Jeux Nathan | 1996 |
| Asterix & Obelix – Die Lorbeeren des Caesar | N&W Spiele | 1997 |
| Le Jeu Asterix | Druon | 2001 |
| Asterix & Obelix | Kosmos | 2006 |
| Astérix: Les Baffes | Kellogg's | 2006 |
| Astérix: Le Défi de l'arène | Lansay | 2007 |
| Astérix: Paf! le Romain | Atomic Mix | 2012 |
| Caesar's Empire | Holy Grail Games, Synapses Games | 2022 |

In 2006, licensed versions of numerous board games were produced, including Monopoly, Cluedo, Draughts, Ludo, Game of the Goose, Trivial Pursuit, Backgammon, Pay Day, Snakes and ladders, Quarto, and others.

== Video games ==
=== Europe and Australia PAL ===
There were releases made as European or Australian PAL.

| Title | Platform | Publisher | Year | Notes |
|---|---|---|---|---|
| Asterix | Atari 2600 | Atari | 1983 | |
| Obelix | Atari 2600 | Atari | 1983 | |
| Astérix et la Potion Magique | PC, Amstrad CPC 464, Thomson MO5 | Coktel Vision | 1985 | |
| Asterix and the Magic Cauldron | Commodore 64, ZX Spectrum, Amstrad CPC | Melbourne House | 1986 | |
| Astérix und Obélix: Die Odyssee | Commodore 64 | Unknown | 1986 | Based on Asterix and the Black Gold, the game came free with the April edition of the German Commodore 64 magazine 64'er. |
| Asterix and the Magic Carpet | Commodore 64, Amiga 500, Atari ST, PC | Coktel Vision | 1987 | |
| Asterix Chez Rahàzade | Amstrad CPC | Coktel Vision | 1988 | CPC version of Magic Carpet. |
| Asterix: Operation Getafix | Amiga 500, Atari ST, PC | Coktel Vision | 1989 | |
| Asterix | Master System | Sega | 1992 | |
| Asterix | Arcade | Konami | 1992 | |
| Asterix | Game Boy, Nintendo Entertainment System, Super NES | Bit Managers/Infogrames | 1993 | |
| Asterix and the Secret Mission | Master System, Game Gear | Sega | 1993 | |
| Asterix and the Great Rescue | Mega Drive, Master System, Game Gear | Sega | 1993 | |
| Asterix and the Power of the Gods | Mega Drive | Core Design/Sega | 1995 | |
| Asterix: Caesar's Challenge | CD-i, PC | Infogrames Multimedia, Philips Interactive Media, Pathé Interactive | 1995 | |
| Asterix & Obelix | Game Boy, Super NES, PC | Bit Managers/Infogrames | 1995 | |
| Asterix: The Gallic War | PlayStation, PC | Infogrames | 1999 | |
| Asterix & Obelix | Game Boy Color | Bit Managers/Infogrames | 1999 | Recolored port of Asterix & Obelix Game Boy version. |
| Asterix: Search for Dogmatix | Game Boy Color | Infogrames | 2000 | |
| Asterix & Obelix Take on Caesar | PlayStation, PC | Cryo Interactive | 2000 | |
| Asterix: Mega Madness | PlayStation, PC | Infogrames Europe | 2001 | |
| Asterix & Obelix: Bash Them All | Game Boy Advance | Bit Managers/Infogrames | 2002 | With Asterix & Cleopatra and a port of Asterix & Obelix Super NES version. |
| Asterix & Obelix XXL | PlayStation 2, PC, GameCube, Game Boy Advance | Atari Europe | 2004 | |
| Asterix & Obelix XXL 2: Mission: Las Vegum | PlayStation 2, PC | Atari Europe | 2006 | |
| Asterix & Obelix XXL 2: Mission: Wifix | Nintendo DS, PlayStation Portable | Atari Europe | 2006 | The PSP version is a port of Asterix & Obelix XXL 2: Mission: Las Vegum; the Nintendo DS version is a different game entirely. |
| Asterix at the Olympic Games | PlayStation 2, PC, Nintendo DS, Wii, Xbox 360 | Atari Europe | 2008 | |
| Asterix Brain Trainer | Nintendo DS | Atari Europe | 2008 | |
| Asterix: These Romans Are Crazy! | Nintendo DS | Ubisoft | 29 October 2009 | |
| Asterix: The Mansion of the Gods | Nintendo 3DS | Big Ben Interactive | 2014 | |
| Asterix & Friends | PC, Mobile | Bandai Namco Entertainment | 2016 | |
| Asterix & Obelix XXL 2: Remastered | PC, PlayStation 4, PlayStation 5, Xbox One, Nintendo Switch | Microids | 29 November 2018 | |
| Asterix & Obelix XXL 3: The Crystal Menhir | PC, PlayStation 4, PlayStation 5, Xbox One, Nintendo Switch | Microids | 21 November 2019 | |
| Asterix & Obelix XXL Romastered | PC, PlayStation 4, PlayStation 5, Xbox One, Nintendo Switch | Microids | 22 October 2020 | |
| Asterix & Obelix XXL Collection | PC, PlayStation 4, Nintendo Switch | Microids | 12 November 2020 | A compilation of the first three XXL games in a single package. |
| Asterix & Obelix: Slap Them All! | PC, PlayStation 4, PlayStation 5, Xbox One, Nintendo Switch | Microids | 2 December 2021 | |
| Asterix & Obelix XXXL: The Ram from Hibernia | PC, PlayStation 4, PlayStation 5, Xbox One, Xbox Series X/S, Nintendo Switch | Microids | 3 November 2022 | |
| Asterix & Obelix: Heroes | PC, PlayStation 4, PlayStation 5, Xbox Series X/S, Nintendo Switch | Nacon | 5 October 2023 | |
| Asterix & Obelix: Slap Them All! 2 | PC, PlayStation 4, PlayStation 5, Xbox One, Xbox Series X/S, Nintendo Switch | Microids | 17 November 2023 | |

Most of the games were only released in PAL format for Europe and also Australia, because of the comic's acceptance in that region, opposed to the lower popularity in other regions.

=== Other regions ===
| Title | Platform | Publisher | Year | Region | Notes |
|---|---|---|---|---|---|
| Asterix | Atari 2600 | Atari | 1983 | North America | Also released as Taz, featuring the Looney Tunes characters instead of Asterix characters. |
| Obelix | Atari 2600 | Atari | 1983 | North America | |
| Asterix and the Magic Cauldron | Commodore 64 | Spinnaker Software | 1986 | North America | Released as Ardok the Barbarian, without the Asterix license. |
| Asterix | Arcade | Konami | 1992 | Japan | |
| Asterix and the Great Rescue | Genesis | Sega | 1994 | North America | |
| Asterix and the Great Rescue | Master System | Tec Toy | 1994 | Brazil | |
| Asterix and the Great Rescue | Game Gear | Sega | 1995 | North America | |
| Asterix and the Secret Mission | Master System | Tec Toy | 1996 | Brazil | Released in Brazil as As Aventuras da TV Colosso, featuring Rede Globo's popular puppet characters instead of Asterix characters. |
| Asterix & Obelix XXL | PlayStation 2 | Atari | 2004 | North America | Released in North America as Asterix & Obelix: Kick Buttix. |
| Asterix & Friends | PC, Mobile | Bandai Namco Entertainment | 2016 | | |
| Asterix & Obelix XXL 2 (Remastered) | PC | Microids | 2018 | North America | First time releasing in the US region. |
| Roman Rumble in Las Vegum: Asterix & Obelix XXL 2 | PlayStation 4, Xbox One, Nintendo Switch | Microids | 2018 | North America | Console version of Asterix & Obelix XXL 2 (Remastered). In 2019, it was released in stores by Maximum Games. |
| Asterix & Obelix XXL Romastered | PC, PlayStation 4, Xbox One, Nintendo Switch | Microids | 2020 | North America | |
| Asterix & Obelix XXL 3: The Crystal Menhir | PC, PlayStation 4, Xbox One, Nintendo Switch | Microids | 2021 | North America | |
| Asterix & Obelix: Slap Them All! | PC, PlayStation 4, Xbox One, Nintendo Switch | Microids | 2021 | North America | |
