= Ideapod =

Social media platform

- Website type: Social networking service
- Area served: Worldwide
- Founders: Mark Bakacs; Justin Brown
- Industry: Internet
- Website: www.ideapod.com
- Registration: Required
- Users: 300,000 (as of August 2016)

Ideapod is a social media platform founded in 2013 by Mark Bakacs and Justin Brown. Ideapod received an endorsement and assistance for funding from Richard Branson, founder of Virgin Group. As of August 2016, its user base is at 300,000.

The Ideapod website has been owned by the Brown Brothers Media company (co-founded by Justin) since some date after 2020, and it primarily publishes AI-generated articles. The original social media platform appears to be defunct.

== History ==
Ideapod is a social media platform that was founded in 2013 by two Australian entrepreneurs Mark Bakacs and Justin Brown. Brown stated that he felt "disillusioned" by social media websites such as Facebook or Twitter, and felt that there was too much "gratuitous information" on these websites. Brown was studying for a PhD in international politics in London, but chose to drop it for the website. Ideapod launched an invite-only beta release on February 24, 2014. Before the beta's release, Ideapod advertised that it featured "100+ influential thought leaders and 150+ leading partners, including the United Nations, and the YMCA."

Ideapod as of October 21, 2014, had 70,000 users; in 2015, they had 150,000 users.

=== Features ===
Ideapod allows participants to create posts which may feature URLs, images, and videos, but limits the length of their post to 1000 characters (or 40 seconds, whichever comes first). People are able to reply to others' posts and collaborate with each other. Its founders stated that they felt that a "140-character tweet" was too small for users to be able to explain "high-level concepts for solving world problems." They also have a feature that allows users to create their own content to share. Like Twitter and Facebook, Ideapod utilizes hashtags to categorize comments. The social media site also features a thing called an "idea cluster," wherein relevant ideas from other users can be found.

== Reception ==
Since its launch in 2014, Ideapod has received generally positive reception. VentureBeat's Harrison Weber described Ideapod as a mixture of Upworthy and Pinterest. He noted that while the Upworthy comparison is due to similarities between its headlines and Upworthy's "obnoxious title formula," he praised it for showing more "restraint with the curiosity gap." He also praised its exclusive nature. The Huffington Post's Melissa Jun Rowley featured discussion of Ideapod in her article about simple social networking. She felt that it was "shaping up to be a futurists' social network" and compared its desire to "create positive change" for society to Change.org.

The website has received ideas and support from several celebrities, including Jason Silva of Nat Geo's Brain Games, best-selling author Brian Solis, and founder and chairman of the Global Partnerships Forum Amir Dossal. Silva gave praise to Ideapod, citing both its "curation" - which he feels creates better spaces for people - as well as the fact that he has seen many fans of his "Shots of Awe" series come to the website to "share awe." Dossal felt that it did well at keeping out the "noise" found in other social media websites, and that he found it "refreshing" to see so many different ideas. The service was officially endorsed by Sir Richard Branson, founder of Virgin Group. He described it as "offering a space where people can bounce ideas off each other." Branson helped secure $3 million in funding for Ideapod.

=== Indiegogo campaign ===
An Indiegogo campaign was initiated in order to help fund an Ideapod mobile app. It was opened on October 18, 2014, and closed on December 12, 2014. Depending on the contribution level, a person can receive early access to the website, early access to the mobile app, and a variety of content produced by members of the website. As of the close on December 12, it had made $53,613 of its $53,000 goal.
