= Étranges Libellules =

Defunct French video game developer

Étranges Libellules S.A.
- Company type: Private
- Industry: Video games
- Founded: January 14, 1994; 32 years ago
- Founder: Frédérique Blanc; Jean-Christophe Blanc; Sylvie Silvy; Pascal Silvy; Jean-Marie Nazaret; Frédérique Nazaret
- Defunct: June 29, 2012; 13 years ago
- Fate: Bankruptcy
- Headquarters: Villeurbanne, Lyon, France
- Products: See complete products listing
- Number of employees: 120 (2010)

Étranges Libellules S.A. (French for "strange dragonflies") was a French video game developer based in the Villeurbanne commune of Lyon.

Founded in 1994 by former Infogrames developers, Étranges Libellules started out as a support studio, working on Little Big Adventure (1994) and Alone in the Dark 3 (1995) among other titles. The studio began developing games in 1997. In 2001, the studio's first game, Kirikou (based on the 1998 animated film Kirikou and the Sorceress), was released. Throughout its life, the studio mainly developed licensed video games, but it did develop one title in an existing video game series; The Legend of Spyro: Dawn of the Dragon (2008).

After a period of financial struggles, the studio went bankrupt in 2012, and went into receivership that April. It was officially liquidated on June 29, 2012.

At the time of its closure, the studio was developing a prototype project for the Kinect. This project was ultimately cancelled with the studio's demise.

== Games developed ==
Year	Game	Platform(s)
2001	Kirikou	PlayStation
2002	The Pink Panther: Pinkadelic Pursuit	Microsoft Windows, PlayStation
2003	Asterix & Obelix XXL	GameCube, Microsoft Windows, PlayStation 2
2005	Asterix & Obelix XXL 2: Mission: Las Vegum	Microsoft Windows, PlayStation 2
2007	Arthur and the Invisibles	Microsoft Windows, Nintendo DS, PlayStation 2, PlayStation Portable
2007	Asterix at the Olympic Games	Microsoft Windows, Nintendo DS, PlayStation 2, Wii, Xbox 360
2008	The Legend of Spyro: Dawn of the Dragon	PlayStation 2, PlayStation 3, Wii, Xbox 360
2010	Alice in Wonderland	Microsoft Windows, Nintendo DS, Wii
2010	How to Train Your Dragon	PlayStation 3, Wii, Xbox 360
