= How to Train Your Dragon (video game) =

2010 video game

- North American Xbox 360 cover art
- Developers: Étranges Libellules; Griptonite Games (DS)
- Publisher: Activision
- Producer: DreamWorks Animation
- Composer: Stephen Barton
- Platforms: Nintendo DS, Wii, PlayStation 3, Xbox 360
- Release: NA: March 23, 2010; AU: March 24, 2010; EU: March 26, 2010
- Genre: Action-adventure Turn-Based (DS)
- Modes: Single-player, multiplayer

How to Train Your Dragon (French: Dragons) is an action-adventure game based on the movie of the same name. It was developed by Étranges Libellules and published by Activision on March 23, 2010, for the Wii, Xbox 360, PlayStation 3 and the Nintendo DS. The game enables players to create their own dragons and move through a series of levels, or to fight amongst friends. It has received generally mixed reviews from critics.

== Gameplay and premise ==
The game takes place a year after the movie's ending. After defeating the Red Death, as a form of celebration, the Tribe has created a festival which they call "Thor'sday Thursday". On this festival, the Vikings always hold a dragon tournament and all of the teenagers are encouraged to participate with the dragons that they've trained. Players can play as either Astrid or Hiccup, the main human characters of the film. (Although Hiccup has his leg, he lost it in the film.) Before entering the actual tournament, players must use the training grounds to train their dragon to fight. After entering the tournament, they must defeat all of the other opponents and, eventually, win the dragon tournament (by defeating Snotlout Jorgenson) and be named dragon-taming champion. The player can create and customize their own dragon in the dragon den, where they also take care of the dragons, feeding it food the players have found all around Berk, the setting of the series.

After finishing dragon fights, players have to help Gobber gather ingredients for some food for the dragons. The ingredients are all located in the Wild Zone. To unlock the Wild Zone, the player must help a handyman Viking to repair the bridge connecting to the Wild Zone by navigating around Berk, borrowing tools from other Vikings. In the Wild Zone, the player can also enter caves and complete mini games with their dragon.

The game also has online features.

== Reception ==
Reception

Aggregate score
Aggregator	Score
Metacritic	DS: 60/100; PS3: 51/100; WII: 59/100; X360: 58/100

Review score
Publication	Score
IGN	PS3/X360: 4.6/10; DS: 6.5/10

The game received generally mixed or average reviews. On Metacritic, the Xbox 360 version received a score of 58 out of 100. IGN gave the PlayStation 3 and Xbox 360 versions a score of 4.6.
