= Street Racer (1977 video game) =

1977 video game

- Developer: Atari, Inc.
- Publishers: Atari, Inc.
- Designer: Larry Kaplan
- Platform: Atari 2600
- Release: September 1977
- Genre: Racing
- Modes: Single-player, multiplayer

Street Racer is a 1977 racing video game developed and published by Atari, Inc. for the Atari Video Computer System, later known as the Atari 2600. It was released in September 1977 as one of the nine launch titles for the system. It was programmed by Larry Kaplan. The game was also published by Sears for their Tele-Games product line as Speedway II.

== Gameplay ==
Gameplay screenshot

Street Racer was one of the two launch titles programmed by Kaplan; Air-Sea Battle was the other. Street Racer offered 27 game variations, grouped into the following sub-games:

- 1–6: Street racer
- 7–12: Slalom
- 13–16: Dodgem
- 17–20: Jet shooter
- 21–24: Number cruncher
- 25–27: Scoop ball

Each of the sub-games has roughly the same gameplay: the player controls a vehicle that must avoid or collect certain objects as they scroll down the screen. Between one and four players can compete simultaneously by using the paddle controllers, which allow the vehicle to move left and right along the bottom of the screen. If a one-player game is selected, the player competes with a static computer opponent that allows objects to collide with it or pass by.

== Development ==
As one of the earliest games written for the platform, Street Racer suffered from unattractive, blocky graphics. According to Kaplan himself, later racing games released for the Atari, such as Activision's 1982 games Barnstorming and Grand Prix, were able to offer improved graphics and gameplay. In a 2007 interview with Digital Press, Kaplan was asked what he would change about any of the games he had written:

Street Racer is the game that lacks good game play. I took out the moving playfield because it didn't flow right (it tended to flicker). If I could change the game to have a smooth-scrolling playfield, it would make the game play better.

Kaplan went on to become one of the founders of Activision where he developed Kaboom!, one of the 10 top-selling games for the Atari 2600.

== Reception ==
Street Racer was reviewed in Video magazine as part of a general review of the Atari VCS where it was given a review score of 5.5 out of 10. The game did not age well and modern critics have given it poor reviews as well. Gamasutra have described the "Number cruncher" sub-game as a highlight of the game.
