= Basic Math (video game) =

1977 video game

- Box art by Susan Jaekel
- Developer: Atari, Inc.
- Publishers: Atari, Inc.
- Designer: Gary Palmer
- Platform: Atari 2600
- Release: September 1977
- Genre: Educational
- Mode: Single-player

Basic Math (Note: Known as Math for the Sears release of the Atari VCS and Fun with Numbers from later releases from Atari.) is an educational video game programmed by Gary Palmer and published by Atari, Inc. for the Atari Video Computer System. (Note: The system became known as the Atari 2600 only after the release of the Atari 5200 in 1982.) The game features a series of ten arithmetic problems involving addition, subtraction, multiplication, or division. The player can edit different gameplay modes to alter how the numbers in the problem are chosen, or if their questions are timed. The game was released in September 1977 as one of the earliest releases for the Atari VCS.

The game is the only known game developed for the VCS by Palmer, who initially worked at Atari creating debugging stations for game developers, and later assisted with work on the Atari 400/800 line of computers. It was the first educational video game for the VCS, with other companies also releasing arithmetic-themed cartridges in the same year for the Fairchild Channel F and RCA Studio II. Both contemporary and retrospective reviews were generally unenthused by the game, with common criticism being that it had poor quality graphics and was not appealing in terms of gameplay or control.

== Gameplay ==
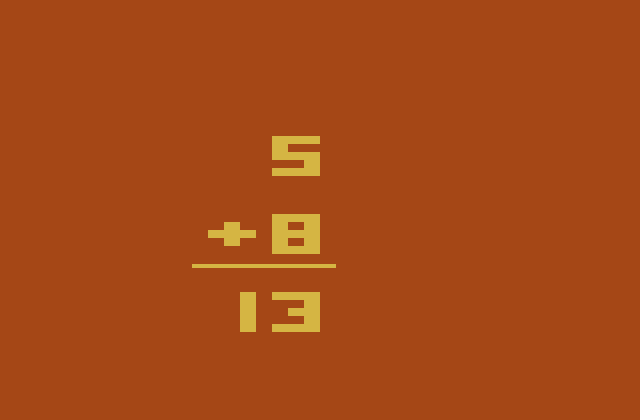
Solving an addition problem in Basic Math. The player controls the line under the zero to manipulate the numbers for the answer.

In Basic Math, each game features 10 rounds of arithmetic problems, involving either addition, subtraction, multiplication, or division. The player moves the joystick to cycle through numbers zero through nine to fill in number prompts. The player scores one point for each correct answer. At the end of 10 rounds, the total number problems is displayed on the right, while the player's score is displayed on the left.

The game features eight modes. In the first four modes, the player can choose what number to start with at the top of the equation, then the computer will decide the second number in line, leaving the player to answer underneath. In the other four modes, both numbers of the equation will be decided by the computer.

The two difficulty switches on the Atari VCS can further change the rules of the game. The right difficulty switch functions on whether or not there will be a timer in the game, whereas the left difficulty switch changes whether the player has 12 or 24 seconds in the first four game modes. In the other four modes, the player has either two-digit problems with a 24-second time limit or single-digit problems with a 12-second time limit.

== Development and release ==
Basic Math's lead designer was Gary Palmer, who joined Atari in February 1977. It is the only known title he developed for the Atari VCS. Prior to making the game, Palmer created debugging stations for the company's game programmers. He would later work on the Atari 400 and 800 computer's I/O functionality and left the company after; it is unknown what he did after he left. Basic Math was the first educational video game released for the Atari VCS. Most of Atari's competitor consoles during this period had similar educational games in 1977, such as RCA Studio II's Math Fun and Fairchild Channel F's two Math Quiz games. Kevin Bunch, author of Atari Archive: Vol.1 1977-1978, suggested that these releases were part of a push for the first generation of programmable consoles to be seen as more than game machines and would include educational programs.

The cover art for Basic Math was designed by Susan Jaekel, who joined Atari after studying art at San Jose State University and connected with the company through Rick Guidice. Basic Math was her first design work for Atari. She said never played any of the games before designing them, and described the art for Basic Math as her "most fanciful and loosest in style." Jaekel would go on to make the box art for further Atari games such as A Game of Concentration (1978) and Adventure (1980).

Basic Math was released in September 1977 as one of the first titles available for the Atari VCS. It was not immediately available at the same time as the console, as the earliest Atari games other than Combat (1977) were initially available by mail order. For the Sears release of the Atari VCS under their Tele-Games label, the game was released as Math. Basic Math was re-released in January 1980 under the title Fun With Numbers. Atari halted production on new carts of the game by January 1982. The game remained in circulation as late as 1988, selling a little over 6,000 copies that year. Basic Math has since been re-released in various Atari-themed compilations, such as Atari: 80 Classic Games in One! for Windows in 2003, Atari Anthology for PlayStation 2 and Xbox in 2004, and the Atari 50 compilation for Nintendo Switch, PlayStation 4, Steam, and Xbox One in 2022.

On April 1, 2022, Atari announced Basic Math: Recharged as a part of their Atari Recharged line of games for April Fools' Day. It is a browser-based edition of the game with updated graphics. Although no longer live on Atari's web site, it is still playable from the Internet Archive.

== Reception ==
Reception

Review scores
Publication	Score
AllGame	1.5/5
The Complete Guide to Electronic Games	1.5/5
Video	5/10

Basic Math was reviewed in Video magazine as part of a general review of the Atari VCS. The reviewer described the gameplay as very basic mathematics and that the controls of the game were more complicated than the game itself. David H. Ahl of Creative Computing also commented that a number keypad would be more suitable for the game, while enjoying the musical tune when a correct answer was given.

From retrospective reviews, Howard J. Blumenthal dismissed the game as "hardly an electronic wonder" in The Complete Guide to Electronic Games (1981), summarizing it as a very basic set of flash cards for elementary school children. A reviewer from TV Gamer in 1983 said it was "an early game, now showing its age," concluding that the educational game Math Gran Prix (1982) was better. Author and video game enthusiast Ken Uston listed the game as among his least favorite from Atari in 1983.

Skyler Miller's review in AllGame said that while Basic Math might be a good way for children to practice arithmetic, it was ultimately a low quality game due to its poor graphics and how complicated it was to adjust the different gameplay modes. Brett Weiss, in his book Classic Home Video Games 1972-1984, also spoke negatively about the graphics, as well as a lack of a two-player mode, while finding the music jingle and timed challenges to be highlights. Kevin Bunch, in his 2023 book Atari Archive: Vol.1 1977-1978, wrote that the game never taught the players how to reach a correct answer, which limited it as an educational tool, and that it would not be fun for either children or adults.

== See also ==
- List of Atari, Inc. games (1972–1984)
- List of educational video games
