= Asterix (1992 video game) =

- European cover art
- Developer: Sega
- Publisher: Sega
- Director: Tomozō Endō
- Designers: Hiroshi Aso; Yoshio Yoshida; Masahide Kobayashi; Tomozō Endō
- Programmer: Takashi Shoji
- Artists: Kyuzou; Takako Kawaguchi; Ryo Kudo
- Composer: Takayuki Nakamura
- Series: Asterix
- Platform: Master System
- Release: PAL: March 1992
- Genre: Platform
- Modes: Single-player, multiplayer

Astérix is a 1992 platform game for the Master System. It is based on the comic book series Asterix and is part of a series of games based on this franchise.

== Gameplay ==
Asterix is a typical side-scrolling platform game where either Asterix or Obelix must navigate through each stage; in most stages the player must locate a key that will open a door at the end of the stage, and in some stages a boss must be defeated to complete the stage. The game is broken up into 8 different areas with between 1 and 3 stages in each area. The player starts with 3 lives and 3 health points; a health point is lost if the character is hit by an enemy, and a life is lost if all health points are lost or if the character falls down a hole. Health points can be obtained by picking up certain items during the game. When certain bosses are defeated a heart is obtained, collecting this heart increases the health capacity by one point. The character can have up to 6 health points.

The player has the choice prior to each stage of choosing Asterix or Obelix to complete the stage; in level 1-1 the player must choose Asterix and level 1-2 the player must choose Obelix. The game can be played with 1 or 2 players, in 2 player mode each player takes turns at completing the stage, player 1 plays the game as Asterix and player 2 plays as Obelix. The stages in the game differ depending on whether the player is playing the stage as Asterix or Obelix. Asterix has the ability to destroy blocks using a magic potion that can be picked up during the level, the block is destroyed by throwing the potion at the block and waiting for the potion to explode. Obelix is able to destroy blocks with a punch and the potion used by Asterix is not available to Obelix. Both characters can defeat enemies with a punch. Obelix being larger in size is unable to access some parts of the level that Asterix would be able to access, and Asterix is unable to access some parts of the level due if the potion is unavailable and Asterix is unable to break the blocks surrounding the area. Due to the differences in the characters the maps for most levels are different for both Asterix and Obelix, making some levels more easy or difficult for each character, and some levels the same for both characters.

A bonus stage can be reached by collecting 50 bones. The bonus stage is played by Dogmatix, in which Dogmatix must jump from bubble to bubble popping each bubble along the way. A red bubble requires Dogmatix to jump on the bubble just once, a yellow bubble when jumped on will turn red and then will be popped after the second jump, and a green bubble will turn yellow after the first jump and then red on the second jump and requiring a third jump to pop the bubble. A bonus is awarded depending on the number of bubbles popped.

== Reception ==
Reception

Review scores
Publication	Score
Computer and Video Games	90%
Joypad	96%
Joystick	96%
Console XS	90%
Mean Machines	80%

The game was received positively by most reviewers, getting mainly 9-10s. Mean Machines magazine praised the game for its resemblance to the comics. HonestGamers commended the game for its visuals, animation, and gameplay. Gametripper praised the game for its faithfulness to the comics, challenge and variety.

Asterix reached number one on the Master System chart published by British magazine Sega Force in July 1992, ahead of Sonic the Hedgehog and Enduro Racer.
