= Alice in Wonderland (2010 video game) =

- European Wii box art
- Developer: Étranges Libellules
- Publisher: Disney Interactive Studios
- Directors: Jean-Marie Nazaret; Marc Dutriez; Sylvain Passot
- Writers: Dan Mayers; Jean-Marie Nazaret
- Composer: Richard Jacques
- Platforms: Nintendo DS, Wii, Windows, Zeebo
- Release: NA: March 2, 2010; EU: March 5, 2010; AU: March 10, 2010; Zeebo: SA: November 9, 2010
- Genres: Action-adventure, platformer, metroidvania
- Mode: Single-player

Alice in Wonderland (French: Alice au pays des merveilles) is an action-adventure game developed by Étranges Libellules and published by Disney Interactive Studios for the Wii, Nintendo DS, Microsoft Windows and Zeebo. Based on the 2010 film of the same name, it was released on March 2, 2010. The Wii, DS, and PC versions were released in March 2010. The DS game is completely different from the Wii and PC versions.

Actors who reprised their roles from the film include Mia Wasikowska (as Alice Kingsleigh), Crispin Glover (as Ilosovic Stayne, the Knave of Hearts), Michael Sheen (as Nivens McTwisp the White Rabbit), Barbara Windsor (as Mallymkun the Dormouse), Stephen Fry (as Cheshire), and Leo Bill (as Hamish Ascot).

== Gameplay ==
=== Wii version ===
Alice in Wonderland allows players to guide, protect and aid Alice as she journeys through the world of Wonderland while unraveling the game's many twisted mysteries. Along the way, players call on a diverse and unique cast of characters such as the Mad Hatter and Cheshire Cat who each have unique abilities to help evade traps and solve challenging puzzles. The Mad Hatter can help Alice alter her perception of Wonderland and take advantage of optical illusions to open up places in the world the player alone would not have noticed. Meanwhile, the Cheshire Cat can use his ability to make himself and objects appear and disappear helping Alice through this strange world. Players must choose wisely when using each of the characters' powers and combine the abilities to solve more complex puzzles.

=== DS version ===
European cover of the Nintendo DS version, which is a different game from other versions

The DS version of the game is quite different from the Wii and PC. It is highly stylized, some characters have different abilities and it is a side-scroller. Absolem is also a playable character where in the other versions he is a NPC. Again the players must guide Alice though Wonderland to eventually face the Jabberwocky.

== Reception ==
Reception

Aggregate scores
Aggregator	Score
GameRankings	(DS) 78.82% (Wii) 70.50%
Metacritic	(DS) 78/100 (Wii) 69/100 (PC) 63/100

Review scores
Publication	Score
Edge	7/10
Eurogamer	8/10
GameRevolution	B−
GameSpot	(DS) 8.5/10 (Wii) 6/10
GameZone	7.5/10
IGN	6.5/10
Official Nintendo Magazine	(DS) 78% (Wii) 73%
VideoGamer.com	7/10
The Daily Telegraph	8/10

The game was met with mostly positive reception upon release. GameRankings and Metacritic gave it a score of 78.82% and 78 out of 100 for the DS version; 70.50% and 69 out of 100 for the Wii version; and 63 out of 100 for the PC version.

GameZone's Michael Lafferty gave the Wii version of the game a 7.5 rating out of 10, commending the graphics and gameplay, despite noting that the game does not bring anything new in the genre. On the other hand, GameSpot gave the game a 6 out of 10 "fair" rating. It noted some of the game's puzzle mechanics and "variety" as good points, while repetitive combat, bad voice acting, visual unevenness, and poor multiplayer were bad points. In comparison, the DS version of the game fared well, earning an 8.5 out of 10 or "Great" rating. For the DS, GameSpot criticized the combat and the occasional experience of not knowing what to do next, but praised the "visual direction", puzzles, characterization, humor, cleverness, and DSi features.
