= Larry Kaplan =

American video game designer and programmer

Larry Kaplan is an American video game designer and video game programmer.

Kaplan studied at the University of California, Berkeley from 1968 through 1974 and graduated with a degree in Computer Science. Larry was inspired to work in the game development industry because of games like Breakout by Atari, Inc.

== Career ==
After graduating in 1974, Kaplan worked at Control Systems Industries for two years. There he worked on the programming behind computerized power grids and was stationed in Missoula, Missouri. He started at Atari, Inc. in August 1976 and wrote video games for the Atari Video Computer System, including two of the console's launch titles: Air-Sea Battle and Street Racer. Kaplan was one of the developers of the operating system for the Atari 400 and 800 home computers. He joined Activision two months after its founding in late 1979. Kaplan left Activision in 1982 to pursue starting his own gaming hardware company Hi Toro.

After Hi Toro, Kaplan started work at Amiga in 1982, but left the same year. Afterwards, Kaplan went back to work at Atari, Inc. and stayed until Spring of 1983, and during this time he acted as vice president of the Consumer Software Division. In 1994, Kaplan began working at Capcom and collaborated on a football game project and left in 1995. The same year he was hired at 3DO working on their gaming system that was in development, the M2. After leaving 3DO in late 1995, Kaplan started working at PDI as the Lead Technical Director on the movie Antz the same month. Kaplan ended up leaving the position in Spring of 1996.

== Games ==
=== Atari 2600 ===
- Combat (1977, Atari) launch title, developed with Joe Decuir, Steve Mayer, and Larry Wagner
- Air-Sea Battle (1977, Atari) launch title
- Street Racer (1977, Atari) launch title
- Brain Games (1978, Atari)
- Bowling (1979, Atari)
- Bridge (1980, Activision)
- Kaboom! (1981, Activision)

=== Atari 8-bit computers ===
- Super Breakout (1979, Atari) port of the arcade video game
