= Kirikou (video game) =

2001 video game

- Developers: Étranges Libellules (PS); Planet Interactive (GBC); Krysalide (PC)
- Publisher: Wanadoo Edition
- Composer: Fabrice Bouillon-LaForest
- Platforms: PlayStation, Game Boy Color, Microsoft Windows
- Release: EU: 9 November 2001 (PS); EU: 16 November 2001 (GBC); EU: November 2001 (PC)
- Genre: Platform
- Mode: Single-player

Kirikou is a 2001 platform game developed by Étranges Libellules for the PlayStation, Planet Interactive for the Game Boy Color and Krysalide for the Microsoft Windows. The game was published by Wanadoo Edition and based on the 1998 French film Kirikou and the Sorceress.

== Gameplay ==
Kirikou is a 3D platformer in which progression is performed on a horizontally scrolling two-dimensional plane. The objective is to overcome the seven levels, collecting drops of water, avoiding the fetishes and overcoming the obstacles to come to face the witch Karabà in the eighth and final level.

== Plot ==
The plot of the game is based on the events of the film. An evil sorceress named Karaba has inflicted terror upon the protagonist Kirikou's village and on the environment surrounding it. To ensure that her scheme for dominance over the region is fulfilled, she has transformed all the men of the village into fetiches. Kirikou's uncle, however, has managed to evade being transformed by Karaba's spell and has set out to combat Karaba by himself. Unbeknownst to him, though, Kirikou has decided to follow his uncle and join him in foiling Karaba's machinations.

== Reception ==
Reception

Review score
| Publication | Score |
|---|---|
| Jeuxvideo.com | PS1: 12/20; PC: 12/20; GBC: 7/20 |
