= Asterix & Obelix XXL 2: Mission: Las Vegum =

2005 video game

- Developers: Étranges Libellules; OSome Studio (Remaster)
- Publishers: Atari; Microids (Remaster)
- Director: Marc Dutriez
- Designer: Marc Dutriez
- Programmers: Benjamin Hervé; Sylvain Béen
- Writers: Nicolas Pothier; Hervé Masseron
- Composer: Fabrice Bouillon-LaForest
- Engine: RenderWare
- Platforms: Microsoft Windows, PlayStation 2, PlayStation 4, Xbox One, macOS, Nintendo Switch, PlayStation 5
- Release: Microsoft Windows, PlayStation 2: EU: 30 September 2005; UK: 30 June 2006; PlayStation 4, Xbox One, macOS, Nintendo Switch: WW: 29 November 2018; PlayStation 5: WW: 29 December 2022
- Genre: Action-adventure
- Mode: Single-player

Asterix & Obelix XXL 2: Mission: Las Vegum is a 2005 action-adventure game developed by Étranges Libellules and published by Atari for Microsoft Windows and PlayStation 2. It is the sequel to Asterix & Obelix XXL (2003). The game, promoted as being the first ever video game parody, stars the French comic book characters Asterix and Obelix, and spoofs popular video game characters in the same fashion that the comics spoof historical characters and make many cultural references. One such example of this is the box art that has a resemblance to the one seen in Grand Theft Auto: San Andreas (2004).

A port for the Nintendo DS and PlayStation Portable titled Asterix & Obelix XXL 2: Mission: Wifix was released in November 2006.

A remaster of the game was released in 2018. A sequel, Asterix & Obelix XXL 3: The Crystal Menhir, was released in 2019.

== Plot ==
Julius Caesar, in another plan to conquer Gaul, builds a theme park called Las Vegum, a parody of Las Vegas, and place the Gauls in a human zoo for when he takes over the village. Getafix surprisingly swears loyalty to Caesar, and helps capture three other druids and force them to help empower his soldiers. Asterix and Obelix come to his rescue, with the aid of a Roman spy named Sam Shieffer (who previously appeared in the first game), a reference to Sam Fisher from the Splinter Cell series.

Las Vegum is divided in 6 zones: Lutetia, WCW, LuckSore (Luxor), Little Venetia (parody of Venice), Pirate Island, and SeizeUs Palace. Throughout the game, Romans who slightly resemble famous video game heroes Mario (Nintendo), Sonic the Hedgehog (Sega), Rayman (Ubisoft), Pac-Man (Namco) and Ryu (Capcom) appear as frequent enemies, while Lara Croft (Eidos Interactive), here a Roman centurion called Larry Craft, appears as a mini-boss. In addition, Caesar references The Matrix series by calling Asterix "Mr. Anderson" and fights them with identical clones.

== Mission: Wifix ==
Asterix & Obelix XXL 2 Mission: Wifix
- Developers: Mistic Software (DS); Tate Interactive (PSP)
- Publisher: Atari
- Platforms: Nintendo DS; PlayStation Portable
- Release: EU: 17 November 2006
- Genre: Action-adventure
- Modes: Single-player, multiplayer

Asterix & Obelix XXL 2: Mission Wifix (French: Astérix & Obélix XXL 2: Mission: Ouifix) is a port of Mission Las Vegum for the PlayStation Portable and the Nintendo DS. Released in 2006, it revolves around the same plot, with added touch screen minigames and Wi-Fi multiplayer modes.

=== Gameplay ===
The PlayStation Portable game uses almost all of the same elements as the console version. The player can switch between Asterix and Obelix at any time and almost every room from the console version is recreated with its plethora of parodies of many video game series. The Nintendo DS game is a 2D platformer where the player must sometimes complete touch-screen minigames throughout the story which can also be played outside of the main adventure mode. Both versions also contain multiplayer modes. The PlayStation Portable version allows up to four players to play competitive games across a wide selection of arenas where one team works to accomplish an objective while the other has to prevent their progress. The Nintendo DS version allows two players to compete on the touch-screen mini-games along with two additional multiplayer-only mini-games.

The game takes the player through such places like Little Paris, WCW, LuckSore, Little Venetia, Pirate Island, and even SeizeUs Palace with each room being created in great detail.

== Remaster ==
A remaster of the game was released in November 2018 for PlayStation 4, Xbox One, Windows, macOS (through Steam and GOG.com), and Nintendo Switch, developed by OSome Studio and published by Microids. It was later released for PlayStation 5 in December 2022. In PAL regions, it received a retail release in the form of both a Limited Edition and a Collector's Edition.

A physical version was released in the United States in November 2019 through Maximum Games, under the name Roman Rumble in Las Vegum: Asterix & Obelix XXL 2, making it the first time the game has been officially released in North America.
