= Destroyer (arcade game) =

1977 video game

- Arcade flyer
- Developer: Atari, Inc.
- Publishers: Atari, Inc.
- Platform: Arcade
- Release: NA: October 1977
- Genre: Action
- Mode: Single-player
- Arcade system: Atari 6800

Destroyer is a 1977 action video game developed and published by Atari, Inc. for arcades. The player attempts to sink ships and destroy submarines from the perspective of a naval destroyer.

== Gameplay ==
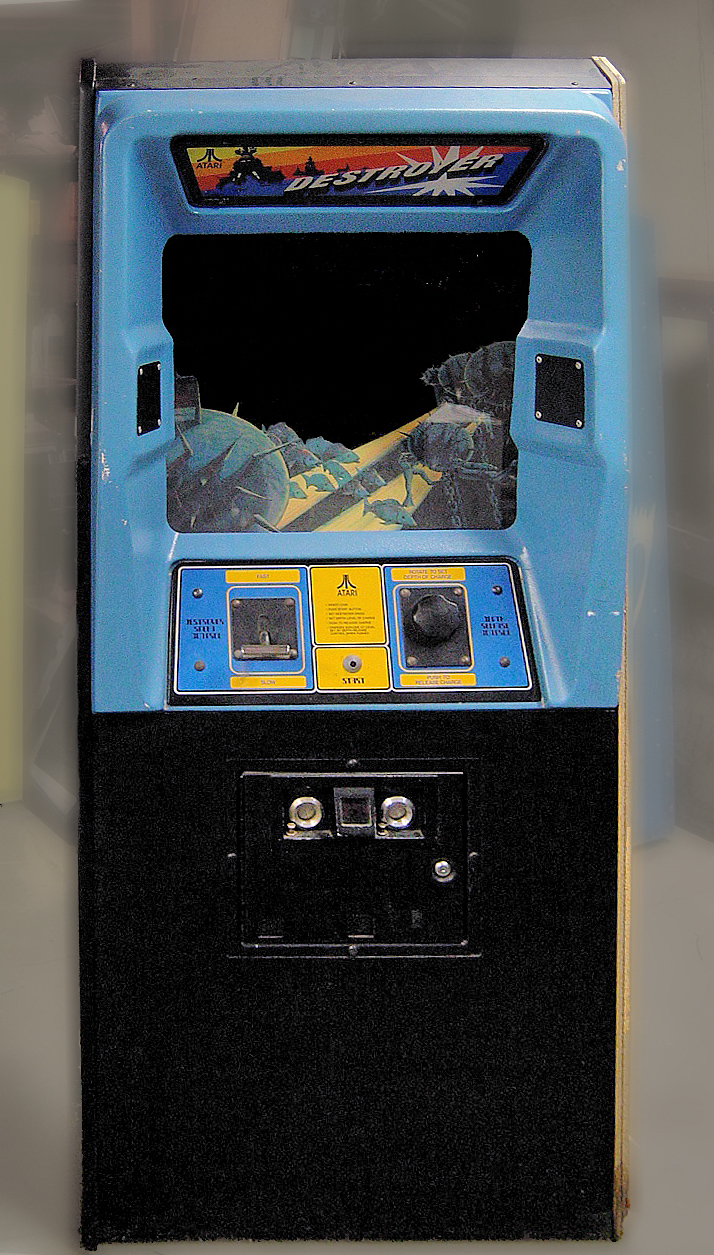
Arcade cabinet

The playfield displays a ship moving across the surface (displayed as a wavy line) and submarines moving across the screen. The target depth is set using a dial control (displayed as a dashed line). Depth charges are dropped by pushing the dial control. The speed of the ship is controlled using a speed lever control. Charges that miss make a low boom. Charges that hit make a louder boom and trigger an explosion sequence. Points are awarded for successful hits. The game is timed, so the goal is to sink or destroy as many submarines as possible before the time expires.

== Development ==
Destroyer is a microprocessor-based game that uses the Motorola 6800. The hardware is similar to Drag Race and Fire Truck, released respectively by Kee Games and Atari within a year.

== Legacy ==
In 1978, coupled with Atari's Canyon Bomber was a game called Sea Bomber which was "basically a port of Destroyer". It was also featured on the Atari Flashback.
