= Anti-Aircraft (video game) =

1975 video game

- Arcade flyer
- Developer: Atari, Inc.
- Publishers: Atari, Inc.
- Platform: Arcade
- Release: NA: June 1975
- Genre: Fixed shooter
- Mode: Multiplayer

Anti-Aircraft is a fixed shooter video game released for arcades by Atari, Inc. in 1975. The game was also released as Anti-Aircraft II, denoting the two-player aspect of the game.

== Gameplay ==
Planes fly overhead, either singly or in pairs, in random directions in the aircraft flight area. The object is to shoot down more planes than the player's opponent during the time limit.

Each player controls an anti-aircraft gun located in the lower left and right corners of the screen, respectively. A player's gun is controlled by three buttons located in each player's control station, which consists of a button for moving up, down, and firing. The up and down buttons move the gun to any one of three predefined positions.

== Legacy ==
A home console port was included in the game cartridge Air-Sea Battle, one of the launch titles for the Atari VCS in 1977.
