= Asterix and the Magic Cauldron =

1986 video game

- Developer: Beam Software
- Publisher: Melbourne House
- Platforms: Amstrad CPC, Commodore 64, ZX Spectrum
- Release: September 1986
- Genre: Adventure
- Mode: Single-player

Asterix and the Magic Cauldron is a 1986 computer game for the Amstrad CPC, Commodore 64 and ZX Spectrum home computers based on the popular French Asterix comic books. In North America, the Commodore 64 version was released as Ardok the Barbarian, without the Asterix license.

== Gameplay ==
Asterix and the Magic Cauldron is a graphical adventure game, where the player takes the role of Asterix, who has to find all the pieces of the missing cauldron, so that Getafix the druid can brew magic potion and the Gaulish village can stand against the Romans.

The game takes place in several interconnected "rooms", each of which take up one screen. The game starts at the Gaulish village, and Asterix can also travel out to the forest, and to Roman camps. When Asterix meets a wild boar or a Roman legionary, a separate fight scene ensues. Defeated wild boar can be eaten to provide extra sustenance.
