= Air-Sea Battle =

1977 video game

- Box art by Cliff Spohn
- Developer: Atari, Inc.
- Publishers: Atari, Inc.
- Designer: Larry Kaplan
- Platform: Atari 2600
- Release: 1977
- Genre: Fixed shooter
- Modes: Single-player, multiplayer

Air-Sea Battle is a 1977 fixed shooter video game developed and published by Atari, Inc. for the Atari Video Computer System (Atari VCS). (Note: The Atari VCS became known as the Atari 2600 only after the release of the Atari 5200 in 1982.) The game was designed by Larry Kaplan who joined Atari in 1976. It was the first game he developed for the company. Air-Sea Battle involves the player controlling a gun to shoot down various targets to earn points in different themed areas. In the various gameplay modes, the player can either control the angle of the gun or move the gun across the screen or adjust the guns speed as it automatically moves for aiming.

Inspired by the game Combat (1977) that was in development at the same time, Kaplan created various modes to the game. The game was inspired by various arcade games of the era, with video game historians identifying the similar gameplay in arcade games like Anti-Aircraft (1975), Drop Zone 4 (1975), Sea Wolf (1976) and Destroyer (1977).

Sears published Air-Sea Battle as Target Fun and used it as the pack-in game for its Tele-Games rebranding of the Atari VCS. Video gave Air-Sea Battle the award for the "Best Target Game" in 1980.

== Gameplay ==
There are several variants of gameplay in Air-Sea Battle. Each game involves the player firing a gun at various objects for points and ends after two minutes and 16 seconds of gameplay, or when either play scores 99 points. The screen will flash to show that their game time is nearing completion. The difficulty switches on the Atari VCS adjust the size of the missile fired. In position "A", the missile is one-fourth the size of position "B".

There are six gameplay styles. In the first six modes, are the "Anti-Aircraft Games", mode seven through ten are "Torpedo Games", modes 13 to 15 are "Shooting Gallery Games", modes 16-18 are "Polaris Games" while 19 to 21 are "Bomber Games", while the remaining six modes are titled "Polaris vs. Bomber Games".

In "Anti-Aircraft Games", the joystick controls the angle of the player's anti-aircraft gun and can be tilted from 30°, 60° and 90°. In "Torpedo Games", the player controls a submarine and can move left and right across half the playfield allowing them to fire only at the ships moving above them. "Shooting Gallery Games" allows the player to angle their gun as they did in "Anti-Aircraft Games" while also sliding their gun left and right across the playfield. The remaining modes has the player's ship or plane moving continuously, allowing the player to control the speed they are travelling, moving the joystick down to move slower while moving it upwards increases their speed.

One to six objects will moves across the playfield with all objects requiring to be hit before a new wave of targets appear. The first three modes of "Anti-Aircraft Games" and "Torpedo Games" have the objects all worth one point, while the next three feature objects of different sizes and speeds that are worth four to zero points. In "Shooting Gallery", the targets can change direction at any time with targets of rabbits, ducks and a clown being worth three, two and one point each respectively. The "Bomber" and "Polaris" games have the players ship moving in constant motion at the top of the playfield or at the bottom respectively. Each mode offers objects again to hit for one to four points each while the "Polaris vs Bomber" mode has the players attacking each other. One hit earns the shooter one point and has their opponent reappears on the edge. The various modes in the game allow for guides missiles, adjusting the speed the missile is shot, a computer opponent, or the ability to add obstacles to some modes such as blimps in "Anti-Aircraft Games", and mines in "Torpedo Games" and "Polaris vs Bomber Games".

== Development ==
In 1976, Warner Communications acquired Atari for $28 million. With new funding from Warner, Atari was able to hire new engineering talent to make games for their new system, the Atari Video Computer System (Atari VCS). Larry Kaplan recalled that when he applied for Atari and joined the company August 1976. Kaplan was told by Bob Brown that he was hired because he mentioned he had purchased an Altair 8800.

The programmers at Atari initially developed their games on a teletype workstation connected to a time-share computer which sent their assembly code to a computer in Oakland that would convert it to binary code that an Atari VCS prototype could understand. This set-up would only display a single line of code at a time and had the programmers using an oscilloscope and analyzer to make sure the display would be synced properly for a television. By 1977, this set-up was changed to PDP-11 machines which featured monitors and floppy disk drives which would speed up game development.

Gameplay of Air-Sea Battle in the "Anti-Aircraft Game" variant. The comb-like graphics on the left are leftover visual artifacts from Kaplan's code to allow for more moving objects on the screen.

Kaplan would design Air-Sea Battle for the system. The initial games for the Atari VCS were all being developed roughly in tandem leading the developers to exchange ideas. As Kaplan saw all the modes of gameplay being created for Combat (1977), he decided to incorporate a variety of alternate modes for Air-Sea Battle. Steven Fulton of Game Developer said Kaplan's game was based on the arcade games Anti-Aircraft (1975) and Destroyer (1977). Kevin Bunch, author of Atari Archive (2023) said the different modes in the games were similar to earlier arcades games, such as Midway's Sea Wolf (1976) and Meadow Games' Drop Zone 4 (1975). Kaplan had acknowledged the influence of Anti-Aircraft, saying that "in those days, we just ripped off anything we could make work." Kaplan found various modes for the games relatively easy to make in regards to the Atari VCS hardware. At the request of Sears, Kaplan changed what were once dogs into rabbits for the "Shooting Gallery Games" mode.

While working on Air-Sea Battle, Kaplan developed a method of moving player objects more than once during a single frame of the picture, despite the ability to do this not being part of the system's initial design. This allowed Kaplan to create more than five objects on screen. The visual artifacts that appear like a comb on the left side of the screen are a result of this trick. When trying to complete work on the game, Kaplan tried to give the computer controlled opponent artificial intelligence. As he was only given two kilobytes (KB) for the final ROM cartridge, he only had the opponent fire continuously, which Kaplan referred to as "silly and not fun at all."

== Release ==
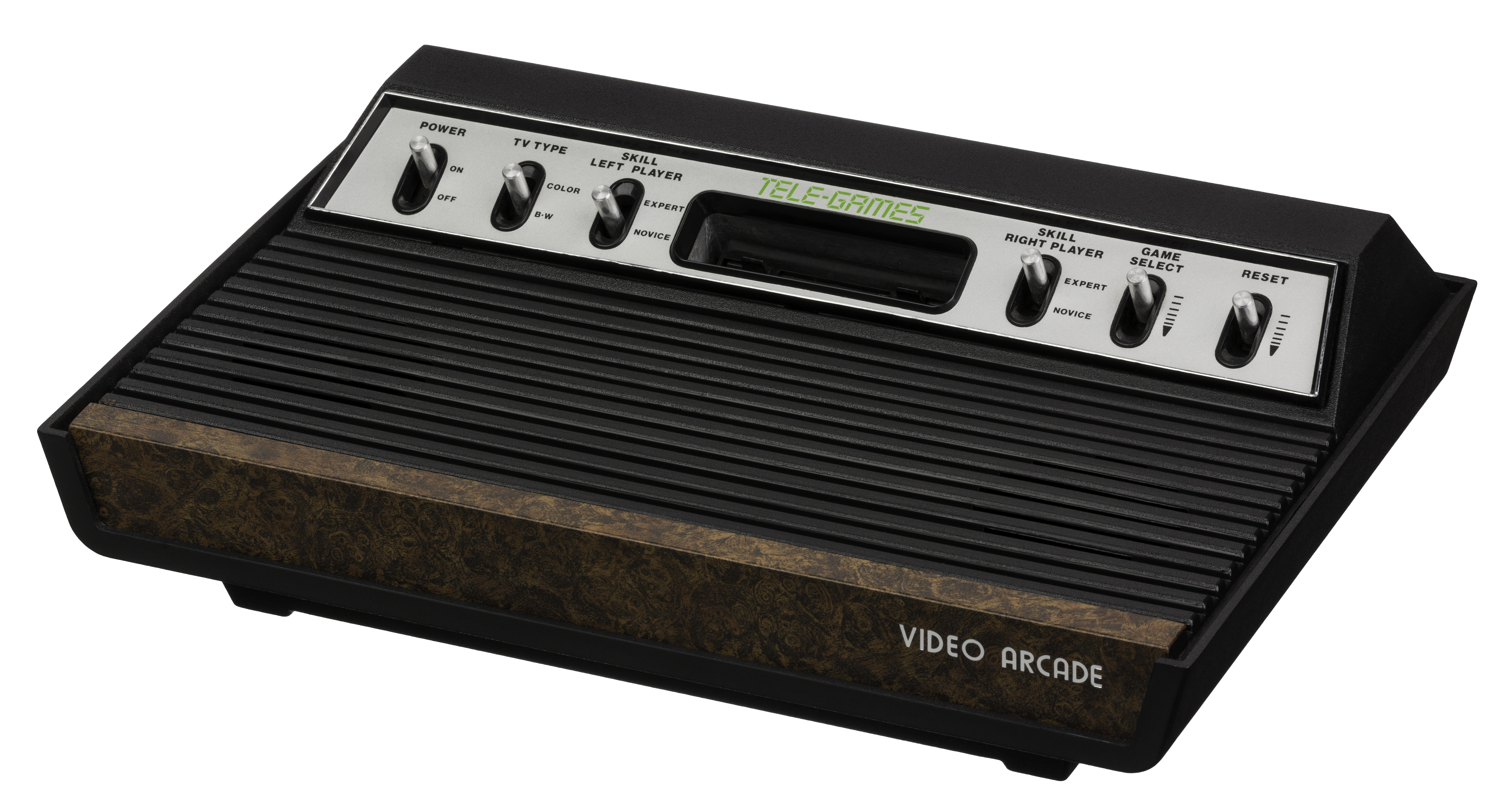
Air-Sea Battle was included with the release of the Tele-Games branded Atari 2600 (pictured) under the title Target Fun.

Air-Sea Battle was promoted as one of the titles available with the launch of the Atari VCS. According to Weekly Television Digest from October 17, 1977, the Atari VCS was shipped to all major American market areas by August 1977. Other than Combat which was released with the Atari VCS, other promotional material from this period noted that these games had to be mail-ordered to be picked up in the weeks following the release of the system. Air-Sea Battle was bundled with the Sears release of the Atari VCS, under its Tele-Games label. The game was retitled Target Fun in this release. The game would remain available on the market for years, with Atari having it in circulation by at least 1988.

Air-Sea Battle was re-released in various video game compilation formats, such as the Atari 80 in One for Windows in 2003 and the Atari Anthology for PlayStation 2 and Xbox in 2004, and Atari 50 (2022) for Nintendo Switch, PlayStation 4, Steam, and Xbox One. It was included in portable gaming compilations such as the Atari Greatest Hits for Nintendo DS and iOS-based smartphones.

== Reception ==
From contemporary reviews, Bill Kunkel and Arnie Katz (under the name Frank T. Laney II) wrote in Video magazine, declaring it "the ultimate game for people who enjoy blowing things up". The two said that the "Torpedo Game" with guides missiles was the best variation on the cartridge due to its addictiveness. The reviewers found the computer's inability to handle guided missile controls in single player mode and recommended playing their previously mentioned "Torpedo Games" variant as a solo game if the player wished to experience a better single-player guided missile game. Katz and Kunkel announced the first game awards in the 1980 issue of Video. For the first awards ceremony, their awards focused primarily on console games and all games released until 1980. Air-Sea Battle received the award for the "Best Target Game".

Retrospective reviews

Review scores
Publication	Score
AllGame	4/5
The Complete Guide to Electronic Games	2/5
Electronic Games 1983 Software Encyclopedia	7/10
Electronic Games 1984 Software Encyclopedia	5/10

Later review from the early 1980s include an overview of the Atari home console game catalogue in 1981, a reviewer in Electronic Games said that Air-Sea Battle was still "one of the finest cartridges in the Atari library." In the same magazine, Kunkel and Bill Laney, Jr. echoed this statement saying the game was an "instant classic" on its release and was still a "remarkably fine videogame". In Electronic Games two Software Encyclopedia issues from 1983, the review complimented the graphics such as the shades of blue in sky and the gameplay such as allowing players to steer missiles. Reviewing the game in 1983, Sai Ming Wong of the British video game magazine TV Gamer described the game as a shoot 'em up whose graphics were reasonable for considering it was one of the first games from Atari. They recommended it to younger players for its simple control and easy to hit targets.

Reviews decades after the games release include Howard J. Blumenthal who wrote in his book The Complete Guide to Electronic Games (1981) that Air-Sea Battle's games had only slight variations from each other. He concluded that the game was as "an oldie", with audiences have come to expect more control and interesting gameplay variations. Skyler Miller of AllGame stating that Air-Sea Battle's sound and graphics were plain, while generally praising the game as simple, addictive and fun and best-played with human second player. In Atari Archives (2023), author Kevin Bunch commented that despite the game being even more simple than Combat (1977) it remained one of the more interesting and fun releases for the system from 1977 and that along with Combat, Surround (1977), and Indy 500 (1977), it was one of the games of its era that "really holds up."
