= Math Gran Prix =

1982 video game

- Developer: Atari, Inc.
- Publishers: Atari, Inc.
- Programmer: Suki Lee
- Platform: Atari 2600
- Release: NA: July 1982; EU: 1983
- Genre: Educational
- Modes: Single-player, multiplayer

Math Gran Prix (released as Maths Grand Prix in Europe) is an educational video game written for the Atari 2600 by Suki Lee and published by Atari, Inc. in 1982.

== Gameplay ==
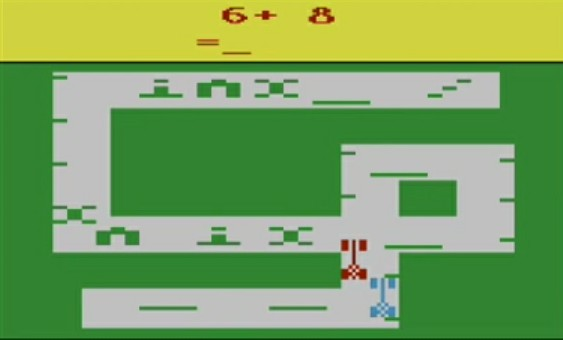
Gameplay screenshot

The player must advance a car through a Grand Prix race by answering mathematics questions, with 9 variations of play. Random bonuses may pop up during play. Both two- and single-player gaming against the computer is possible, with the computer's calculation speed slowed artificially compared to its normal speed of calculation in single-player mode. Questions included addition, subtraction, multiplication, and division. The game is aimed at 7- to 10-year-old children.

== Development ==
The game was programmed by Suki Lee. Lee went on to work on Obelix, also for the Atari 2600. The cover art for the game was drawn by Warren Chang.

== Reception ==
In a January 1983 review, the British computer games magazine TV Gamer described the game as "certainly a lot more entertaining than its predecessor, Basic Maths". A review in the January 1983 edition of Tilt, a French video game magazine, gave the game 2/6 for graphics and 4/6 for interest, saying that it might even be of interest to adults.

Reviewing the game in 2017 in the book The A-Z of Atari 2600 Games: Volume 2, Kieren Hawken described the game as "nothing more than a curio. An ugly and very unexciting curio at that!" and gave the game 3/10 overall.

Menno Deen, in a PhD thesis for the Eindhoven University of Technology, cited Math Gran Prix as "an example of the restrictive nature of early edutainment titles of the 80s", stating that the game's lack of player autonomy does not impart motivation to learn. He furthermore stated that Math Gran Prix and other mathematics edutainment games "adopt the instructional model of the explainer and instructor, focusing on skill mastery and correct performances" rather than facilitating experimentation or exploration, the latter two of which he argued are more conducive to learning.

== See also ==
- List of Atari 2600 games
- Basic Math (1977)
