= Pigs in Space (video game) =

1983 video game

- Developer: Atari, Inc.
- Publishers: Atari, Inc.
- Designer: Michael Sierchio
- Programmers: Bill Aspromonte; Robert Zdybel; John Russell
- Platform: Atari 2600
- Release: NA: November 1983; EU: 1983
- Genre: Shoot 'em up
- Modes: Single-player, multiplayer

Pigs in Space is a three-in-one 1983 video game developed and published by Atari, Inc. for the Atari 2600. It is based on the "Pigs in Space" sketch series on the then-popular television series The Muppet Show. The game is the last in a series of children-friendly games developed by Atari for the Atari 2600. Atari marketed the games as being good for the development of hand-to-eye coordination.

== Gameplay ==
Gameplay of the three Pigs in Space games

The game consists of three different Muppets-themed games accessible from a common menu.

The first game is a Space Invaders clone called Chickenvaders in which Captain Link Hogthrob runs along the bottom of the screen firing sausages at egg-dropping chickens, and at Gonzo who occasional flies across the top of the screen in a flying saucer.

The second is Pastaroids, a Frogger clone in which Miss Piggy must dodge flying pasta and meatballs to cross the screen from bottom to top to reach the ship USS Swinetrek.

The third is Escape from the Planet of the Gonzoids, in which the player is Doctor Strangepork controlling the Swinetrek as it flies through tunnels shooting robots (called Gonzoids) that throw pizzas.

== Development ==
The game was designed by Michael Sierchio in collaboration with Jim Henson, and programmed by Bill Aspromonte, Robert Zdybel, and John Russell. The cover art was created by Linda King.

== Reception ==
A review in the November 1983 issue of Videogaming and Computer Gaming Illustrated was broadly positive, especially about the gameplay and graphics, and describing the game as "a very satisfying release" having "something for everyone". The only point of criticism was the simplistic graphics used to depict Gonzo. The 1984 Software Encyclopedia published by Electronic Games magazine was broadly positive about the game, giving it an overall rating of 7/10.

In a 2009 review written for Retro Gamer, Michal Mozejko gave a mixed review, criticizing especially the slowness of Escape from the Planet of the Gonzoids but appreciating the nostalgia value of the game. In the 2011 book Classic Home Video Games, 1972-1984 A Complete Reference Guide, Brett Weiss gave a mixed review as "derivative (if nice looking) games" and criticized especially Escape from the Planet of the Gonzoids, which he described as a "dull, repetitious shooter".
