= Asterix & Obelix XXL =

2003 video game

- European GameCube cover art
- Developers: Étranges Libellules; Velez & Dubail (Game Boy Advance); OSome Studio (Remaster)
- Publishers: Atari; Microids (Remaster)
- Director: Jean-Marie Nazaret
- Designers: Jean-Marie Nazaret; Vincent Achille; Marc Dutriez; Vincent Ravier; David Silvy
- Programmers: François Jean; Guillaume Blanc
- Artists: Jean-Christophe Blanc; Frédérique Blanc
- Writer: Jean-Marie Nazaret
- Composers: Fabrice Bouillon-LaForest; Valentin Lafort (Remaster)
- Platforms: PlayStation 2, GameCube, Microsoft Windows, Game Boy Advance, PlayStation 4, Xbox One, Nintendo Switch, macOS, PlayStation 5
- Release: PlayStation 2: FR: 21 November 2003; UK: 19 March 2004; NA: 14 September 2004; GameCube, Windows, Game Boy Advance: EU: 18 June 2004; PlayStation 4, Xbox One, Switch: WW: 22 October 2020; macOS: WW: 17 July 2022; PlayStation 5: WW: 1 December 2022
- Genre: Action-adventure
- Mode: Single-player

Asterix & Obelix XXL is a 2003 action-adventure game published by Atari. It was developed by Étranges Libellules for PlayStation 2, GameCube, and Microsoft Windows, and by Velez & Dubail for the Game Boy Advance. The game stars the French comic book characters Asterix and Obelix as they battle the Romans after their village is sacked. It was released in the United States (for PlayStation 2 only) with the title Asterix & Obelix: Kick Buttix although there were plans to release the Windows version in the US once.

A sequel, Asterix & Obelix XXL 2: Mission Las Vegum, was released in 2006. A remaster of the game was released in 2020.

== Plot ==
One ordinary day in the village, Asterix, Obelix, and Dogmatix leave for the forest to hunt for wild boars. As they are walking, a storm begins to brew, and a nearby tree is struck by lightning. Dogmatix is scared and runs away. While they are searching for him, Asterix and Obelix see flames in the distance. Asterix hurries off to investigate, while Obelix remains and searches for Dogmatix. Upon arriving at the scene, Asterix meets a Roman secret agent, formerly in Caesar's service. He feels scorned for having been sacked by Caesar and agrees to help Asterix and Obelix foil the Romans' plans. Asterix enters the village to find it ablaze and full of Romans. He quickly defeats them and makes his way through the Gaulish countryside to a hilltop by the sea. There, he meets up with Obelix, who tells him that Dogmatix is still nowhere to be found. They learn from the Roman agent that their fellow villagers have been kidnapped by the Romans. Asterix and Obelix then follow him to a dock, where he points out two barges far off in the distance, and mentions that their friends are probably being held prisoner aboard them. Further up the path, the secret agent finds Dogmatix, and Obelix's beloved pet joins the duo in their Roman-bashing antics. Asterix and Obelix then fight off many more Roman soldiers, plowing through a country road. After finally defeating all of the warriors, the two discover a padlocked wagon at the end of the road. Obelix breaks open the door, and the village druid, Getafix, clambers out. He explains to them that while he was locked up, he overheard Caesar's plans to send the Gaulish villagers to different parts of the Roman Empire. Their locations were etched into a white marble map, which Caesar smashed after showing to his soldiers. Thus, Getafix returns to the village, and Asterix, Obelix, and Dogmatix set off to the first location to free their fellow villagers from the clutches of the Romans.

== Gameplay ==
Gameplay involves the rescuing of various villagers while solving large puzzles and defeating the Roman masses. The player automatically switches between Asterix and Obelix depending on the situation. The two characters have slight differences, such as in speed or strength. The only significant difference is Obelix's ability to smash iron crates without a magic potion and his ability to push and pull larger platforms than Asterix. Many puzzles involve the use of a special reusable torch that only Asterix may carry, and a sliding platform guided by a rope, both of which occur in every province of the Roman Empire.

The player may redeem helmets collected from defeated Romans. These helmets can be used to buy power-ups, like extra health and new attack combinations from a travelling merchant in each province. There are two types of helmets: ordinary grunts' helmets (worth 1 helmet) and gold centurions' helmets (worth 10 helmets). The latter are usually acquired from iron crates or dropped by high-ranking enemies, such as commanders and gladiators. The player can also pick up gourds of magic potion, which are found regularly. These can only be consumed by Asterix, and are used immediately when collected. After consuming the potion, the player becomes much stronger for a very limited time. The potion allows Asterix to defeat Romans in a single hit and to run much faster. In addition, they allow the player to perform a triple jump and smash iron crates. If Asterix consumes another potion while already under the effect of a previous one, he will generate a huge shockwave that causes all nearby enemies to drop their weapons.

Combat is performed by bashing the Romans with bare hands. The ordinary grunts are the easiest to defeat, with many more powerful classes of enemies. After being bashed, certain enemies will remain dazed for a few moments, at which point some of them can be picked up and swung around the head like a lasso, damaging all other enemies in the vicinity and breaking nearby crates. Dogmatix can also be dispatched during battle. He will bite the enemy soldiers, causing them to drop their weapons and rendering them easily vulnerable to attack.

In each province, the heroes will encounter the Roman agent, who will provide them with helpful information on operating machinery and bring them up to date on the Romans' latest plans. At the end of each province (with the exception of Gaul), there is a boss fight. The bosses are invariably large machines of war, operated by several Romans. After the machines are destroyed, the captive villagers are freed, and they provide Asterix and Obelix with another section of the marble map, allowing them to continue and rescue the other villagers. Each province (with the exception of Gaul) contains unique enemies native to that area. Players are able to revisit any previous areas in order to collect more helmets, or to find more Golden Laurels.

Throughout the game, players may find Golden laurel wreaths, accessible under different conditions; some are as simple as picking them up, while others are obtained by complex puzzles or fulfilling various conditions. The laurel wreaths when collected permit the player to unlock hidden bonuses, such as new attire, purely for cosmetic effect.

Transport in the game is fulfilled by a manner of catapulting. At different points in an area, the player may find a catapult, which when used will send the player to the next location nearby instantaneously.

== Remaster ==
A remastered version titled Asterix & Obelix XXL Romastered was released on PlayStation 4, Xbox One, Nintendo Switch and Microsoft Windows in October 2020, developed by OSome Studio and published by Microids. It was later released for macOS and PlayStation 5 in 2022. The remaster features upgraded visuals, reworked gameplay animations, new game modes, a new camera and new soundtrack. An option to switch to the original visuals and soundtrack is also included.

== Reception ==
Reception

Aggregate score
Aggregator	Score
Metacritic	59/100

Review scores
Publication	Score
4Players	66%
GameSpot	5.4/10
IGN	6.7/10
Jeuxvideo.com	12/20
