= Suki Lee =

American video game designer and computer programmer

- Occupations: Programmer; Video game designer Project manager
- Notable work: Math Gran Prix (Atari 2600)

Suki Lee is an American video game designer and computer programmer. She was one of the few female developers at Atari, Inc. in the early 1980s where she wrote the educational game Math Gran Prix for the Atari 2600 (1982) and Obelix (1983) for the same system. Afterward she worked as a project manager at Apple Computer. Lee is featured in a celebratory movie called "Once Upon Atari" (2003), where she describes the working experience at Atari.

== Education ==
Lee received her bachelor's degree at San Jose State University in 1981 with a major in general engineering.

== Career ==
Lee was hired by Atari after college in August 1981, and was the first Chinese-American programmer to work for the company. She was there until 1984, when she started working for Cadtrak Corporation developing software user interfaces for petroleum plant layout. She also worked for Apple from 1986 to 1997, then later went to work at Palm, eCircle and WebTV until 1997. In late 2002, she resigned and continued working at Apple.

== Games ==
- Math Gran Prix (Atari 2600, 1982)
- Obelix (1984)

=== Unreleased ===
- Donald Duck's Speedboat (1982)
- Miss Piggy's Wedding (1983)

== Cultural impact ==
The artwork “Suki Lee: The Hidden Past” by Linda Lai, Yifan Lin and Amanda Zhu was inspired by the game Donald Duck's Speedboat.
