= Obelix (video game) =

1983 video game

- Developer: Atari, Inc.
- Publishers: Atari, Inc.
- Designer: Suki Lee
- Programmer: Suki Lee
- Artist: Dave Jolly
- Composers: Andrew Fuchs; Jeff Gusman
- Platform: Atari 2600
- Release: NA: 1983; EU: 1984
- Genre: Shoot 'em up
- Mode: Single-player

Obelix is a 1983 video game developed and published by Atari, Inc. for the Atari 2600. It is centred around the characters Asterix and Obelix created by René Goscinny and Albert Uderzo.

== Gameplay ==
Obelix on the Atari 2600

The player controls Asterix whilst Obelix marches back and forth at the top of the screen carrying a menhir on his back. The player must temporarily stun Roman legionaries and centurions so that Obelix can throw a menhir at them to kill them. If the menhir misses, the stunned Roman may wake up, in which case the player can either attempt to escape to a lower level in the game or drink a magic potion to escape through the enemy soldiers.

== Development ==
The game was released shortly after a similar game called Asterix, and was developed on the same license. The game was written by Suki Lee with graphics by Dave Jolly and audio by Andrew Fuchs and Jeff Gusman. Lee previously wrote Math Gran Prix for the Atari 2600.

== Reception ==
A review in the February 1984 edition of the German magazine TeleMatch rated the graphics as good-to-satisfactory, praised the sounds, but also found the game overly similar to the (then recently released) Atari 2600 game Asterix. They summed up the game as one that people would find enjoyment in playing. A review in the January–February edition of the French magazine Tilt was generally positive about the game and complemented the graphics.

In a retrospective review in 2018, Kieren Hawken praised the innovative gameplay and sound, giving the game 8/10 overall.
