= Fire Truck (video game) =

1978 video game

- Arcade flyer
- Developer: Atari, Inc.
- Publishers: NA: Atari, Inc.; JP: Namco
- Programmer: Wendi Allen
- Platform: Arcade
- Release: NA: June 1978; JP: 1978
- Genre: Racing
- Modes: Single-player, multiplayer

Fire Truck is a 1978 video game developed and published by Atari, Inc. for arcades. Fire Truck is built on the technology created for Atari's Super Bug game also developed by Allen.

A single-player version was released as Smokey Joe. It is internally identical to Fire Truck. Both games were programmed by Wendi Allen. (Note: Credited as Howard Delman.) Fire Truck was distributed in Japan by Namco.

== Gameplay ==
Screenshot

Players must cooperate to drive the truck through traffic as far as possible without crashing, avoiding parked cars and oil slicks. While the game can be played with one player, it was primarily designed for two. The front player steers the tractor of the truck sitting down, controlling the gas and brakes, while the rear player stands and steers the tiller for the rear wheels, controlling the swing of the trailer. If playing with only one player, the computer controls either the front or the back accordingly.

Flashing arrows appear on the course to indicate correct turns at intersections. The amount of time left in a play session is indicated by the amount of fuel left. Players can select from an easy or hard course. Along with their scores, players are given a driver rating out of "Sorry", "So-So", "Good", or "Ace".

The cabinet also provides the players with bells and horns, although these have no use in the actual game.

== Development ==
Wendi Allen joined Atari in 1976. Allen recalled a discussion about the possibility of developing a co-operative two-player driving game. This led to the development of Fire Truck, whose core concept was two players working together for a common goal. Allen had previously been the designer of the arcade game Super Bug (1977) and used the same technology of that game on Fire Truck. Some enhancements included making the ladder end of the truck a separate motion object as well as adding more sounds and the ability to add a second steering wheel. To make the game playable for a single player game, Allen had it so the computer controlled player would be able to control either the front of the back of the truck. Allen said that this "took a lot of tweaking to get something that would feel okay without feeling over controlling".

John Ray was the hardware engineer for the game and had joined Atari in 1977. Fire Truck was the first video game he worked on. He created the analogue circuitry to create the sounds of sirens and horns in the games which he described as "pretty tricky for [himself] as my focus was primarily on digital electronics."

== Release ==
A dedicated cabinet that was a single-player mode only of the game titled Smokey Joe was made and released in the same year as Fire Truck. Allen said that this was created as operators said the Fire Truck cabinet took too much floor space for the amount of money it was earning. Fire Truck was distributed in Japan by Namco in 1978.

Fire Truck was included in Atari 50 (2022) compilation game for Nintendo Switch, PlayStation 4, Steam, and Xbox One.

== Reception and legacy ==
In the United States, RePlay magazine listed Smokey Joe as the ninth highest-grossing arcade game of 1978 and the original Fire Truck as the year's 12th highest-grossing title.

In a retrospective review, Anthony Baize of AllGame found the graphics weak but no better or worse than any other contemporary game of the period and commended the game for its co-operative gameplay and finding it to be "a fun videogame from the earliest stages of coin-op history"

While earlier games such as Pong Doubles (1973) had players team up for a common goal, Fire Truck was designed around the core concept of two players working together for a co-operative play.
