= Brain Games =

1978 video game

- Box art by Cliff Spohn
- Developer: Atari
- Publisher: Atari
- Programmer: Larry Kaplan
- Platform: Atari 2600
- Release: October 1978
- Genre: Puzzle
- Modes: Single-player, multiplayer

Gameplay of Brain Games

Brain Games is a 1978 puzzle video game programmed by Larry Kaplan and published by Atari for the Atari 2600. It is a compilation of six memory games in which the player is tasked with outwitting an opponent, controlled either by another player or artificial intelligence, in sound and picture puzzles. The game is played using a 12 button keypad, as opposed to the Atari 2600’s traditional CX40 joystick controller.

Brain Games was suggested in the 1984 book Clinical Management of Memory Problems as an effective clinical device for memory retraining exercises. Noted for having a variety of useful games, patients would be faced with auditory and visual cues that may improve spatial reasoning.

== Gameplay ==
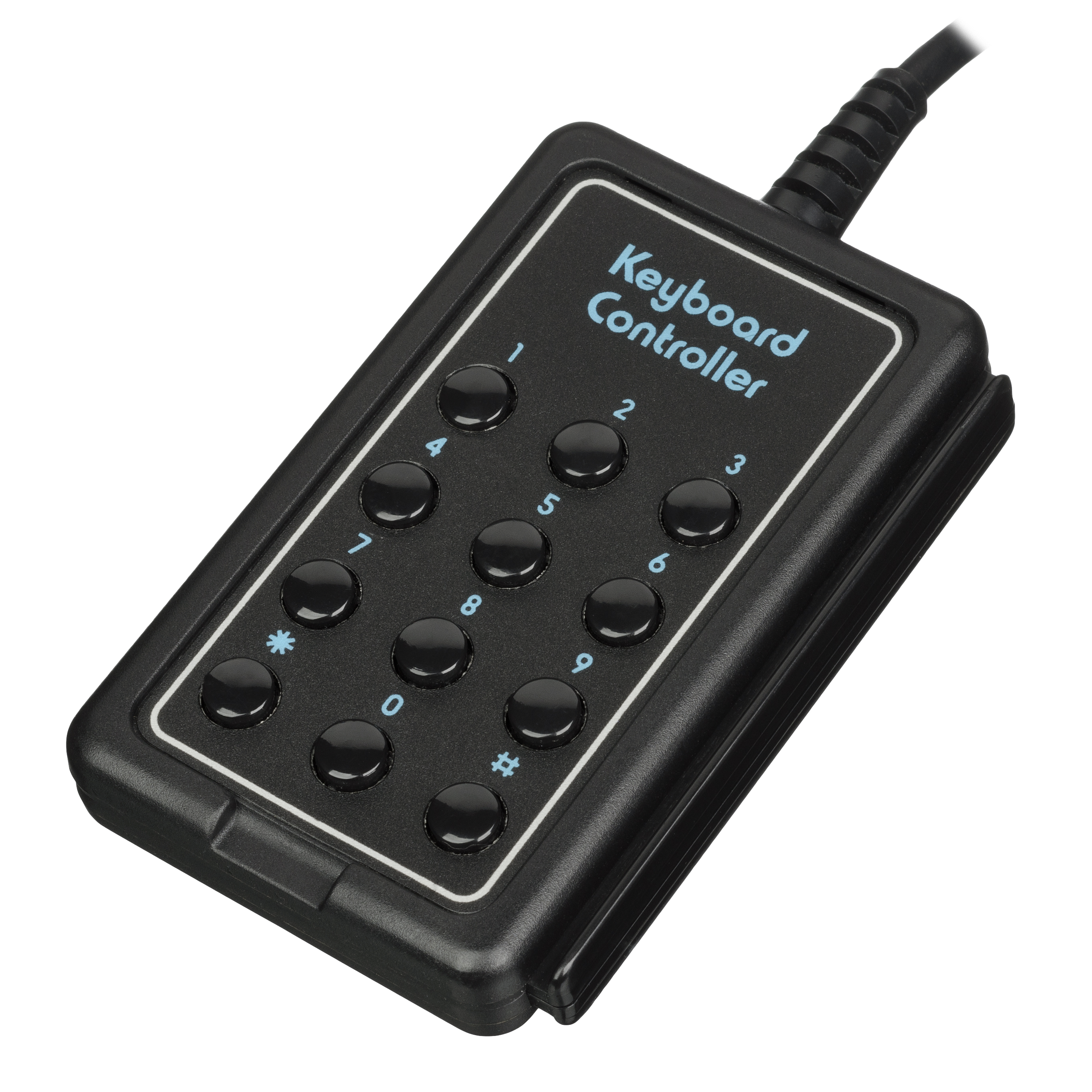
Brain Games utilizes the Keyboard Controller; a keypad which features a simplified version of the ITU E.161 arrangement of digits and symbols.

Featuring a total of six games, the catalog of Brain Games includes a variety of memory games where the player must focus on a series of ciphers, symbols, and musical notes. Each game has several options for altering the "difficulty switches", which add different aspects of challenge and have the following progression:

Game	Variants
Touch Me	1–4
Count Me	5–8
Picture Me	9–10
Find Me	11–14
Add Me	15–18
Play Me	19

"Touch Me", which is the video version of the 1974 arcade game of the same name, was the precursor for the handheld game Simon, in which the player must match a sequence of tones, and the computer would add a new note upon each successive turn. This continues up until the player completes a 32 consecutive note execution. In "Find Me", the player must detect subtle differences in the figures as they are flashed on the screen; in "Picture Me", the player must memorize the placement of the picture sets, which the computer then rearranges. "Count Me" requires the player to match a sequence of digits played by the computer; upon correctly ordering the digits, the computer adds a new digit to the sequence. "Add Me" also utilizes numeric digits as part of the challenge, although the player must determine the sum of the digits presented by the computer. Finally, "Play Me", which turns the 12-button keypad controller into a musical instrument, allows players to play the songs "Happy Birthday to You", "Twinkle, Twinkle, Little Star", and "Three Blind Mice". If two keypad controllers are plugged in, the players can play a duet with "Row, Row, Row Your Boat" as well. Adding to the timed challenges are "diabolical distractions", such as loud noises.

Atari later released a handheld version of Touch Me.

== Reception ==
In his 2011 book, Classic Home Video Games, 1972-1984: A Complete Reference Guide, Brett Weiss said of Brain Games that "Despite the variety of options, Brain Games is limited in scope".

== Legacy ==
Brain Games was re-released bundled with BASIC Programming and two keypad controllers in the Back to School Pak in 1978.

== See also ==
- List of Atari 2600 games

== Sources ==
- "Brain Games". Atari Catalog. The Corporation. 1981. OCLC 318360547.
- "Learning Center". Atari Catalog. Atari, Inc. 1982. OCLC 289452867.
- Herman, Leonard (1997). Phoenix: The Fall & Rise of Videogames. Rolenta Press. ISBN 0-9643848-2-5.
- Johnson, Doris McNeely (1982). Children's Toys and Books: Choosing the Best for All Ages from Infancy to Adolescence. Scribner. ISBN 0-684-17767-6.
- "Some Programmable TV Games". Kiplinger's Personal Finance. 32 (11). Kiplinger Washington Editors, Inc19. November 1978. ISSN 1528-9729.
- "New York". Newyorkmetro.com. 13 (40). New York Media, LLC. October 27, 1980. ISSN 0028-7369.
- Weiss, Brett (2007). Classic Home Video Games, 1972-1984: A Complete Reference Guide. McFarland. ISBN 978-0-7864-3226-4.
- Wilson, Barbara A.; Moffat, Nick (1984). Clinical Management of Memory Problems. Aspen Systems Corp. ISBN 0-89443-308-3.
