= Taz (video game) =

1983 video game

- North American cover art
- Developer: Atari, Inc.
- Publishers: Atari, Inc.
- Designer: Steve Woita
- Artists: Jerome Domurat; Steve Woita
- Series: Looney Tunes
- Platform: Atari 2600
- Release: 1983
- Genre: Action
- Mode: Single-player

Taz is a video game developed and released by Atari, Inc. for the Atari 2600. It features the Looney Tunes character the Tasmanian Devil in a food frenzy. Within the game, Taz only appears as a tornado.

The same game was released as Asterix in Europe, with the character Asterix instead of Taz.

== Gameplay ==
Gameplay screenshot

The player guides Taz between the stage lines in order to eat hamburgers and avoid the dynamites. The game does not use any buttons and the difficulty increases by increasing the speed of the objects on screen. As the game progresses, the burgers may change into other edible or drinkable objects such as root beers, hamburgers, etc. There are not many sound effects in the game except a blipping sound when the player hits an edible object and another sound that resembles of explosion when the player hits dynamite.
