= Atari Game Brain =

1978 unreleased home video game console

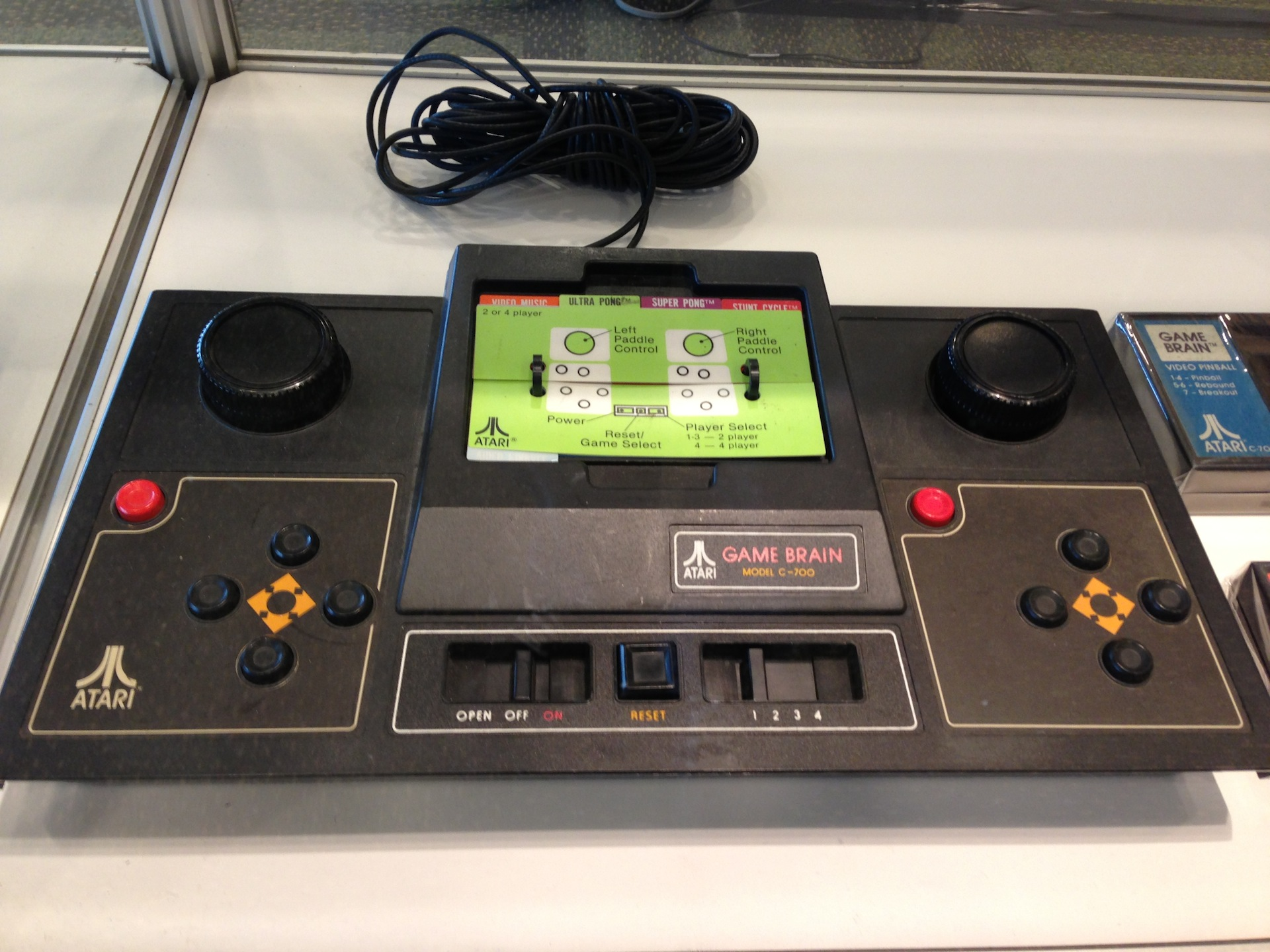
- Also known as: C-700
- Developer: Atari, Inc.
- Type: home video game console
- Generation: First generation
- Released: Unreleased (1978)
- Storage: ROM cartridge
- Controller input: Built in

The Atari Game Brain (model number: C-700) is an unreleased home video game console that was developed and planned for release by Atari, Inc. in June 1978. It plays 10 particular games, converted from all of Atari's previously released dedicated consoles, such as Pong, Stunt Cycle, and Video Pinball. Its controllers are on the console face, with 4 directional buttons, a paddle, and a fire button. Games are inserted in the top of the system by opening a door that also bears a small instruction booklet.

The system was not intended as a big seller for Atari but rather as a clearance of CPUs from unsold dedicated consoles. By the time the Game Brain was finished, dedicated consoles were becoming obsolete against consoles with removable ROM cartridges, such as the already released Fairchild Channel F, the RCA Studio 2, and Atari's own Video Computer System (later renamed to the Atari 2600). Atari canceled the Game Brain around 1978. Three Atari Game Brain consoles and five prototype cartridges are known to exist.

== Games ==
- Pong
- Stunt Cycle
- Super Pong
- Super Pong ProAm
- Super Pong ProAm 10
- Super Pong 10
- Ultra Pong
- Ultra Pong Doubles
- Video Music
- Video Pinball
