= Video Pinball series =

Series of home video game consoles

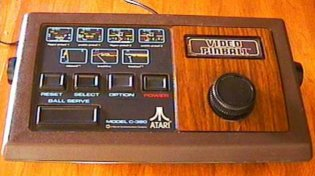
- Model C-380 woodgrain
- Developer: Harold Lee
- Manufacturer: Atari, Inc.
- Type: Series of dedicated home video game consoles
- Generation: First generation
- Released: NA: 1977
- Display: Horizontal orientation, Raster, medium resolution
- Dimensions: 7.5(W) x 3.5(H) x 13.5(D)"
- Predecessor: Atari Stunt Cycle
- Successor: Atari 2600

The Video Pinball brand is a series of first-generation single-player dedicated home video game consoles manufactured, released and marketed by Atari, Inc. starting in 1977. Bumper controllers on the sides or a dial on the front are used to control the games depending on the game selected. There are four game types in the Video Pinball series: Flipper Pinball, Paddle Pinball, Basketball (called Rebound), and Breakout.

The first model is based on the single chip 011500-11/C011512-05 ("Pong-on-a-chip") produced by Atari.

== Gameplay ==
Video Pinball allows 7 games—4 pinball variations, a basketball game, and two versions of Breakout (Breakout and a variant called Break Away)—for one to two players. The unit provides digital on-screen scoring, automatic serves, and color graphics. Video Pinball uses a microcontroller and a small amount of RAM rather than the "Pong on a chip" IC's that had been used in the slew of pong machines Atari Inc. had been releasing. Pinball is played primarily with the side bumper buttons, and Breakout and Basketball with the dial and top buttons. When playing the flipper pinball game, the flippers only momentarily move to the upward position and cannot be held there by the player. The object the paddle pinball game is for the player to hit various targets to score points; these targets change color as they are hit, and some can disappear. The object of the Breakout game is to remove a wall of bricks one at a time using a ball bouncing off a moveable paddle controlled with dial. The playing options allow the games to adjust to different skill-levels.

== Models ==
Video Pinball was one of a series of Atari dedicated consoles which each cost nearly $100,000 to develop.

There were three different models of Video Pinball released over its lifetime. Atari released both woodgrain and cream-colored versions as "Atari Video Pinball" Model C-380. An OEM version whose name was changed to "Pinball Breakaway" was also produced for Sears under the Sears' Tele-Games label. In Japan it was released by Epoch in 1979 as the Epoch TV Block.

The console connects to a TV set for display. It can be powered with 6 'C' batteries or by buying an adapter can use mains current. Buttons on top of the machine are used the select games and their variations.

In 1978 the system was offered for sale between $64.95 and $89.95.

Atari's Video Pinball was the last dedicated "Pong" console line produced by Atari before the transition to their cartridge-based Atari VCS (later Atari 2600), marking the end of the first generation of home gaming as the industry shifted toward interchangeable game libraries. A cartridge based console called "Game Brain" was developed by Atari but never released; one of the cartridges for this machine used the IC chip from Video Pinball.

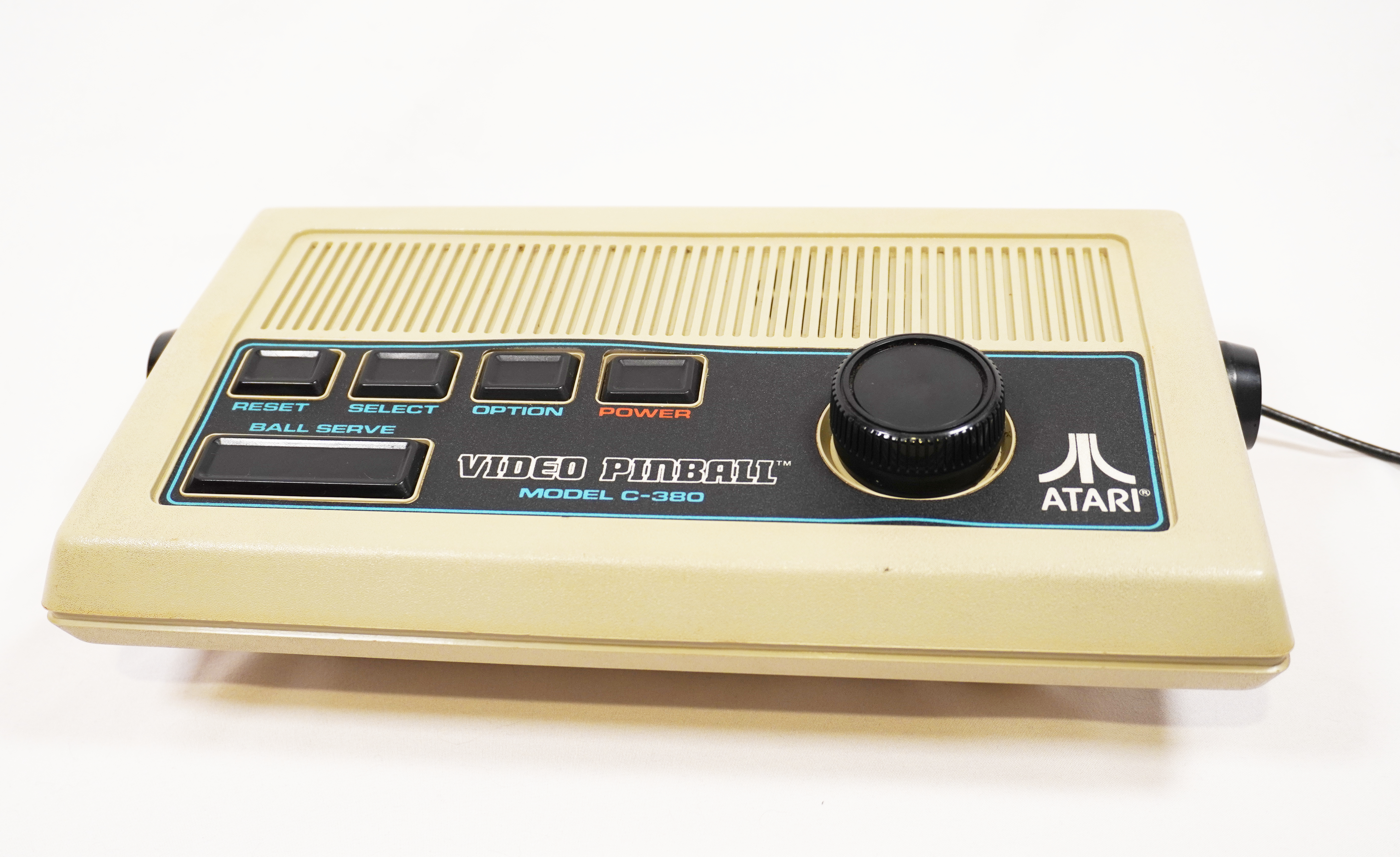
Atari Video Pinball Model C-380; cream colored

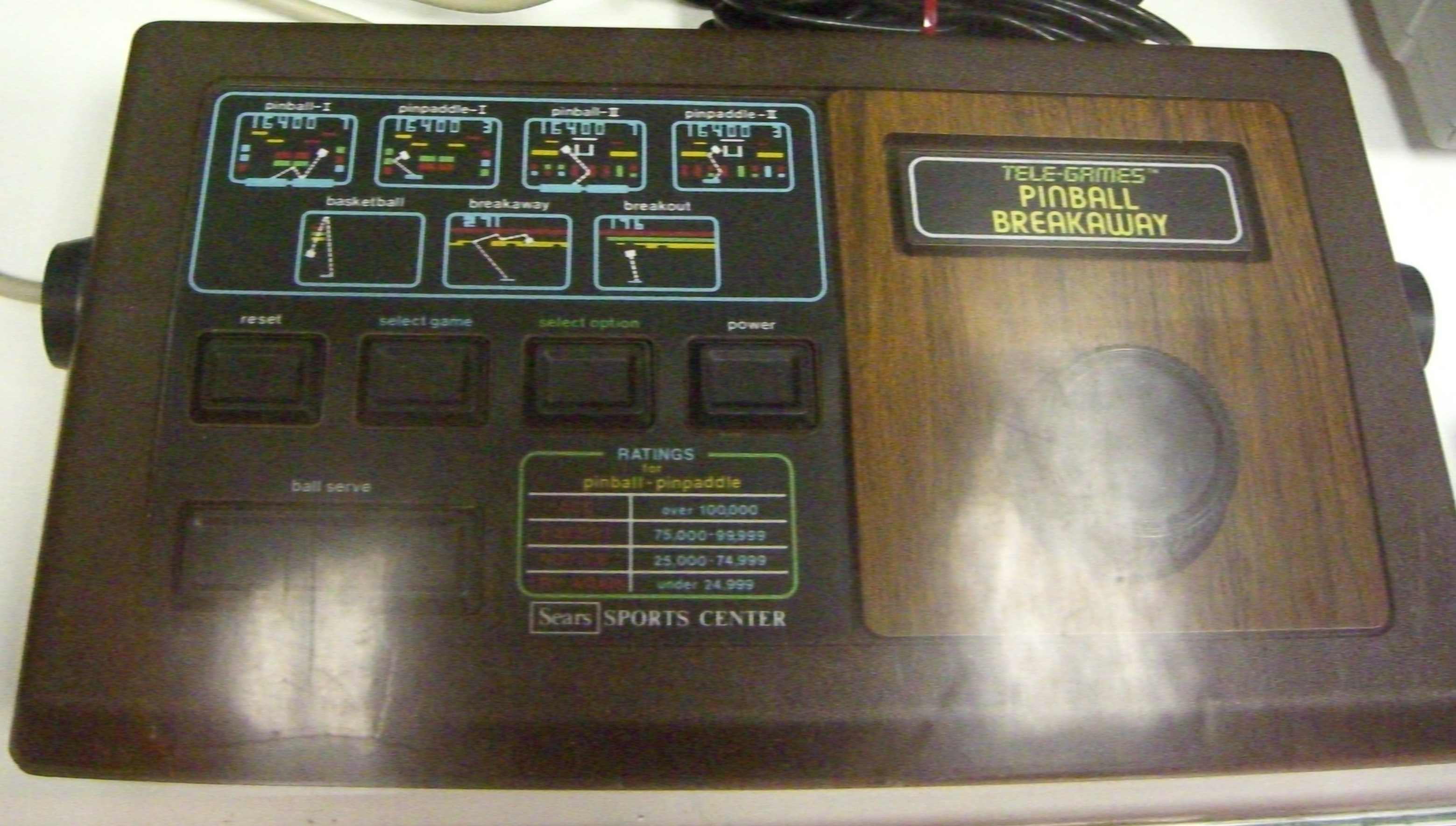
Sears Pinball Breakaway

== Reception ==
A contemporary review of the system in Creative Computing said the most popular game is undoubtedly Breakout.

== Arcade ==
An arcade video game version, called Video Pinball, was released by Atari in February 1979. The cabinet includes a color playfield which is reflected with a mirror into view of the player; with a black and white raster video system. It is controlled with standard flipper buttons, but the flippers and ball are virtual; with the ball launched using a realistic plunger. It sold a total of 1,505 arcade cabinets.
