= Atari 2700 =

Prototype home video game console

- Developer: Atari, Inc.
- Type: Home video game console
- Released: Cancelled
- Media: Cartridge
- CPU: MOS Technology 6507 @ 1.19 MHz

The Atari 2700 (also known the Atari Remote Control VCS) was a prototype home video game console that was developed by Atari, Inc. to be a wirelessly controlled version of Atari's popular Atari 2600 system. Intended for release in 1981, the 2700 was one of several planned follow-ups to the 2600, but the system was never put into full production. While It is unclear how many of these systems exist, former Atari employee Dan Kramer has stated that at least 12 consoles were made (one is owned by The National Videogame Museum), plus extra controllers.

The 2700 is fully compatible with the Atari 2600 system and was intended to use that system's games and accessories. The 2700's new features over the 2600 include wireless controllers featuring a combination of a joystick and paddle, touch sensitive switches, and a streamlined wedge–shaped case.

Internally, the product was also called the "RC Stella", where "RC" referred to Radio Control and "Stella" was the internal Atari codename for the 2600.

== Features ==
=== Controllers ===
USPTO image of Atari 2700 controller

The 2700 wireless controllers operate via radio signals. They feature an on/off switch and are powered by a replaceable 9-volt battery. Communication with the console is achieved via a flexible antenna. Each controller is designated as either a left (player 1) or right (player 2) and cannot be swapped.

Each 2700 controller features a single fire button and a short stick which combines the features of a standard 8 position joystick and a 270 degree paddle controller. Game Select and Reset buttons appear on both the controllers and the console, the latter presumably for instances where standard wired controllers would be used instead of the wireless units.

=== Console ===
The console features two standard Atari 9-pin controller ports on its right side, allowing for use of other 2600 compatible controllers such as Atari-made and third-party joysticks, as well as Atari's own Driving Controller, Paddles, Kid's Controller, Keypad Controller, and Trak-Ball. The top surface features a 2600 style cartridge slot and touch-sensitive buttons with associated red LEDs, including buttons for functions directly related to the wireless controllers, such as selecting between the wireless controllers and any plugged in, and for switching the function of the wireless controllers between joystick and paddle mode.

The case represented a significant departure from previous Atari consumer product designs, dispensing with aesthetics of earlier Atari consoles. Faux wood grain inlays and mechanical throw switches were replaced by a sleek, dark brown wedge with indented touch sensitive switches. The casing featured a hinge-topped storage bay for the wireless controllers and a built-in belly groove for winding excess cable to connect to a TV.

== Cancellation ==
Although they were the primary innovation of the 2700, it was the wireless controllers that actually caused the console to be cancelled prior to release. Specifically, the wireless controllers had a working radius of approximately 1,000 feet (300 m), but there was no mechanism for pairing a given set of controllers with a specific console, which meant controllers for any one 2700 could unintentionally affect other nearby 2700s. Furthermore, the controllers were based on the design of garage door openers, which led to concerns that they could accidentally trigger other remote controlled devices.

== Legacy ==
Although abandoned, the 2700 case design became the model for a number of later Atari game systems, notably the very similar looking Atari 2800 for Japan and the similar Atari-made Sears-branded Video Arcade II, both of which featured (wired) controllers which combined the functions of joystick and paddle. The case design also influenced a whole range of subsequent Atari home consoles, including the Atari 5200 (which featured a 2700-like controller bay), as well as the Atari 2600 Jr., and Atari 7800.

The idea of wireless controllers for the 2600 and joystick compatible systems re-emerged in 1983 with the release of the Atari 2600 Wireless Remote Controlled Joystick, a plug-in accessory (Model No., CX 42). However, to house additional electronics to correct the interference problem, the controllers are bulky. Additionally, they are difficult to control and suffer from poor battery life. The 2012-released Atari Flashback 4 also features wireless controllers based on infrared technology.

== Technical specifications ==
- CPU: MOS Technology 6507 @ 1.19 MHz
- Audio+video processor: TIA. 160 x ≈192 pixel, 128 colors (121 of them actually different from each other on NTSC, 114 on PAL), 2 channel mono sound.
- RAM: 128 bytes (plus up to 256 bytes built into the game cartridges)
- ROM (game cartridges): 4 KB maximum capacity (32 KB+ with paging)
- Output: B/W or color TV picture and sound signal
