= Triple Hunt =

1977 video game

- Arcade flyer
- Developer: Atari, Inc.
- Publishers: Atari, Inc.
- Platform: Arcade
- Release: NA: April 1977
- Genre: Potentiometer calibrated gun
- Mode: Single-player

Triple Hunt is a shooter-style arcade video game developed by Atari programmer Owen Rubin, and released in April 1977. The game's main feature is its mounted light gun, which is used to shoot at the screen on a separate cabinet. Each Triple Hunt unit houses three changeable games: Witch Hunt, Hit the Bear, and Raccoon Hunt. The game graphics are displayed over the background graphics, and when a monitor mask is placed on the screen, the graphics 'disappear' behind the mask. Since the gun is light operated, the shots would not go through the mask, and did not count. It was first introduced at the Third Annual Distributor Meeting banquet on March 22, 1977.

== Gameplay ==
Unique amongst other games at its time, Triple Hunt contains three different games, each played by solely using the gun, which registers shot position by use of vertical and horizontal potentiometers. The three games had to be swapped out by the operator by changing the graphic panels and flipping a switch. The objective of all three games is to simply earn the highest score possible before a timer ran out. The player has no limit on the number of shots fired, and the gunshots will display on the screen one at a time. A timer in the corner of the screen counts down until the display reaches "00". However, if the operator has turned on extended play and the player's score exceeds the extended play score, then the player is given extra play time, and the timer increases to half of the original value.

Hit the Bear focuses on the player aiming for and shooting at either a large or a small animated bear that walk through an on-screen forest. When a bear is hit, it would stand, roar, and turn around to walk in the opposite direction. Once a bear walks off of the screen, the other would walk back on screen in the opposite direction. Each game lasts for 100 ticks, unless extended play is activated. The current Hit The Bear high score is held by Blaine Locklair with a score of 4,460.

Raccoon Hunt has the player shooting at up to four raccoons as they climb up the screen. Instead of a timer, the counter in the corner shows how many raccoons will appear. The raccoons climb up the screen faster as the player's score also increases through four levels, and once the counter reaches 00, the game will end.

Witch Hunt features a haunted house with witches, ghosts, and bats emerging from holes. The player must shoot at all characters on screen until the timer runs out to 00. Witch Hunt also includes over three minutes of background sounds, which were provided from a hybrid of solid state sound sources and 8-track tapes.
