= Atari, Inc. =

American video game developer (1972–1992)

- The Atari logo, also known as the "Fuji"
- Industry: Video games
- Founded: June 27, 1972; 54 years ago
- Founders: Nolan Bushnell; Ted Dabney
- Defunct: June 26, 1992; 34 years ago
- Fate: All operating divisions sold off in 1984–85. Merged into parent company in 1992.
- Successors: Atari Games; Atari Corporation
- Headquarters: Sunnyvale, California, United States
- Products: Pong; Atari 2600; Atari 8-bit computers; Atari 5200
- Parent: Warner Communications (1976–1990); Time Warner (1990–1992)
- Subsidiaries: Chuck E. Cheese (1977–1978); Kee Games (1973–1978)

Atari, Inc. was an American video game developer and home computer company founded in 1972 by Nolan Bushnell and Ted Dabney. Atari was a key player in the formation of the video arcade and video game industry.

The company was founded in Sunnyvale, California, in the center of Silicon Valley, to develop arcade games, starting with Pong in 1972. As computer technology matured with low-cost integrated circuits, Atari ventured into the consumer market, first with dedicated home versions of Pong and other arcade successes around 1975, and into programmable consoles using game cartridges with the Atari Video Computer System (Atari VCS or later branded as the Atari 2600) in 1977. To bring the Atari VCS to market, Bushnell sold Atari to Warner Communications in 1976. In 1978, Warner brought in Ray Kassar to help run the company, but over the next few years, gave Kassar more of a leadership role in the company. Bushnell was fired in 1978, with Kassar named CEO in 1979.

From 1978 through 1982, Atari continued to expand at a great pace and was the leading company in the growing video game industry. Its arcade games such as Asteroids helped to usher in a golden age of arcade games from 1979 to 1983, while the arcade conversion of Taito's Space Invaders for the VCS became the console's system seller and killer application. Atari's success drew new console manufacturers to the market, including Mattel Electronics and Coleco, and fostered third-party developers such as Activision and Imagic.

Looking to stave off new competition in 1982, Atari leaders made decisions that resulted in overproduction of units and games that did not meet sales expectations. Atari had also ventured into the home computer market with its first 8-bit computers, but its products did not fare as well as its competitors'. Atari lost more than US$530 million in 1983, leading to Kassar's resignation and the appointment of James J. Morgan as CEO. Morgan attempted to turn Atari around with layoffs and other cost-cutting efforts, but the company's financial hardships had already reverberated through the industry, leading to the 1983 crash that devastated the U.S. video game market.

In July 1984, Warner Communications sold the home console and computer division of Atari to Jack Tramiel, who then renamed his company Atari Corporation. The original Atari, Inc. was renamed Atari Games, Inc. after the sale. In 1985, Warner formed AT Games, Inc., a joint venture with Namco that acquired the coin-operated assets of Atari Games, Inc. AT Games was subsequently renamed Atari Games Corporation. Atari Games, Inc. was then renamed Atari Holdings, Inc. and remained a non-operating subsidiary of Warner Communications and its successor, Time Warner, until being merged back into the parent company in 1992.

== Origins ==
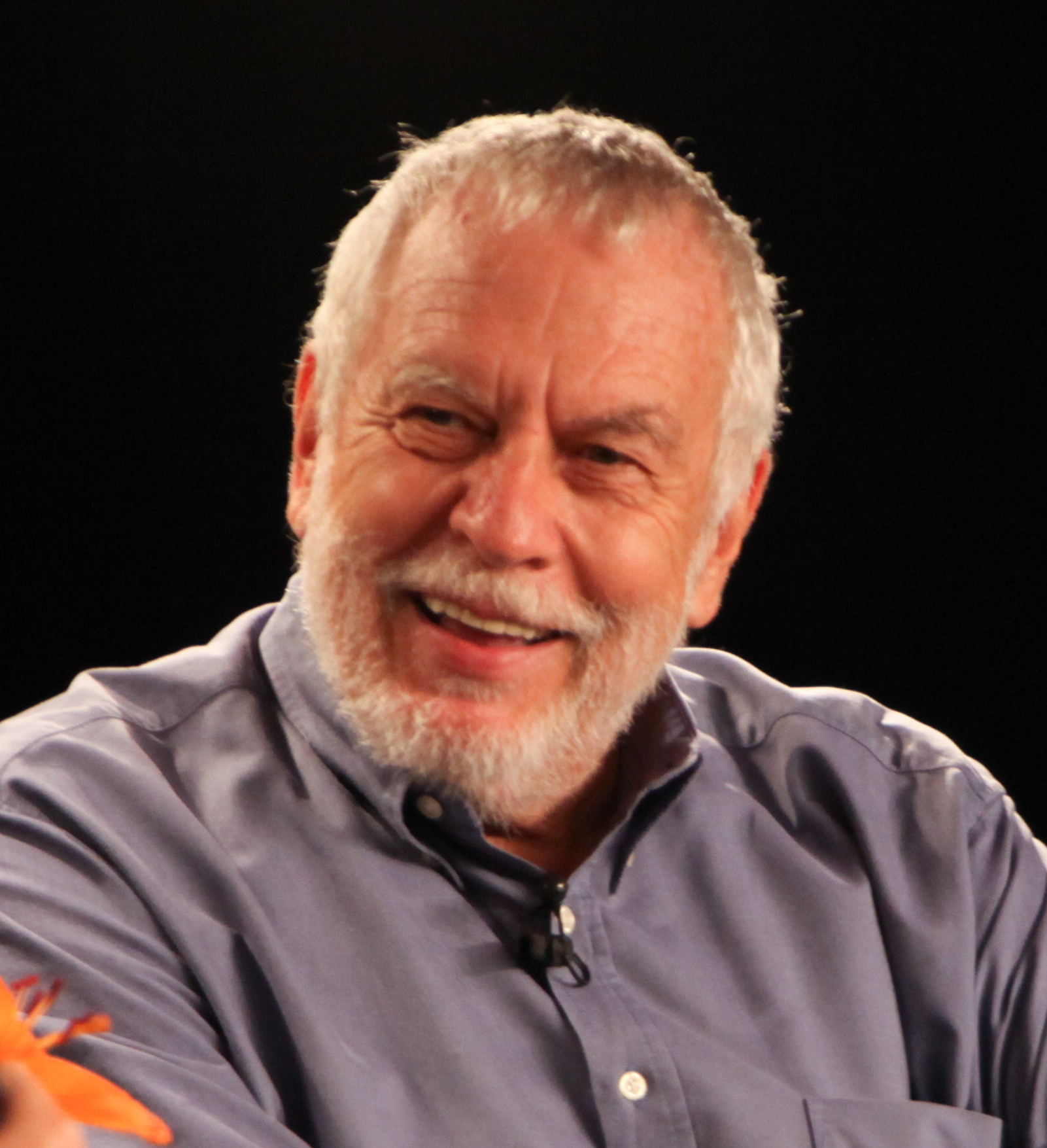
Bushnell in 2013

Atari's first wordmark, as seen in the first print ad for Pong, in a 1973 issue of Cash Box
Short lived logo used in mid-1973

While studying at the University of Utah, electrical engineering student Nolan Bushnell had a part-time job at an amusement arcade, where he became familiar with arcade electro-mechanical games. Bushnell watched customers play and helped maintain the machinery, while learning how it worked and developing his understanding of how the game business operates.

In 1968, Bushnell graduated, became an employee of Ampex in San Francisco and worked alongside Ted Dabney. The two found they had shared interests and became friends. Bushnell shared with Dabney his gaming-pizza parlor idea, and had taken him to the computer lab at Stanford Artificial Intelligence Laboratory to see the games on those systems. They jointly developed the concept of using a standalone computer system with a monitor and attaching a coin slot to it to play games on.

To create the game, Bushnell and Dabney decided to start a partnership called Syzygy Engineering in 1971, each putting in US$250 of their own funds to support it. They had also asked fellow Ampex employee Larry Bryan to participate, and while he had been on board with their ideas, he backed out when asked to contribute financially to starting the company.

Bushnell and Dabney worked with Nutting Associates to manufacture their product. Dabney developed a method of using video circuitry components to mimic functions of a computer for a much cheaper cost and a smaller space. Bushnell and Dabney used this to develop a variation on Spacewar! called Computer Space, where the player shot at two UFOs. Nutting manufactured the game. While they were developing this, they joined Nutting as engineers, but they also made sure that Nutting placed a "Syzygy Engineered" label on the control panel of each Computer Space unit to reflect their work in the game. Computer Space did not fare well commercially when it was placed in bars, Nutting's customary market. Feeling that the game was simply too complex for the average customer unfamiliar and unsure with the new technology, Bushnell started looking for new ideas. About 1,500 Computer Space cabinets were made, but were a difficult product to sell. While Bushnell blamed Nutting for its poor marketing, he later recognized that Computer Space was too complex of a game, as players had to read the instructions on the cabinet before they could play. Bushnell said, "To be successful, I had to come up with a game people already knew how to play; something so simple that any drunk at any bar could play."

== As a private company ==
=== Founding and Pong (1972) ===
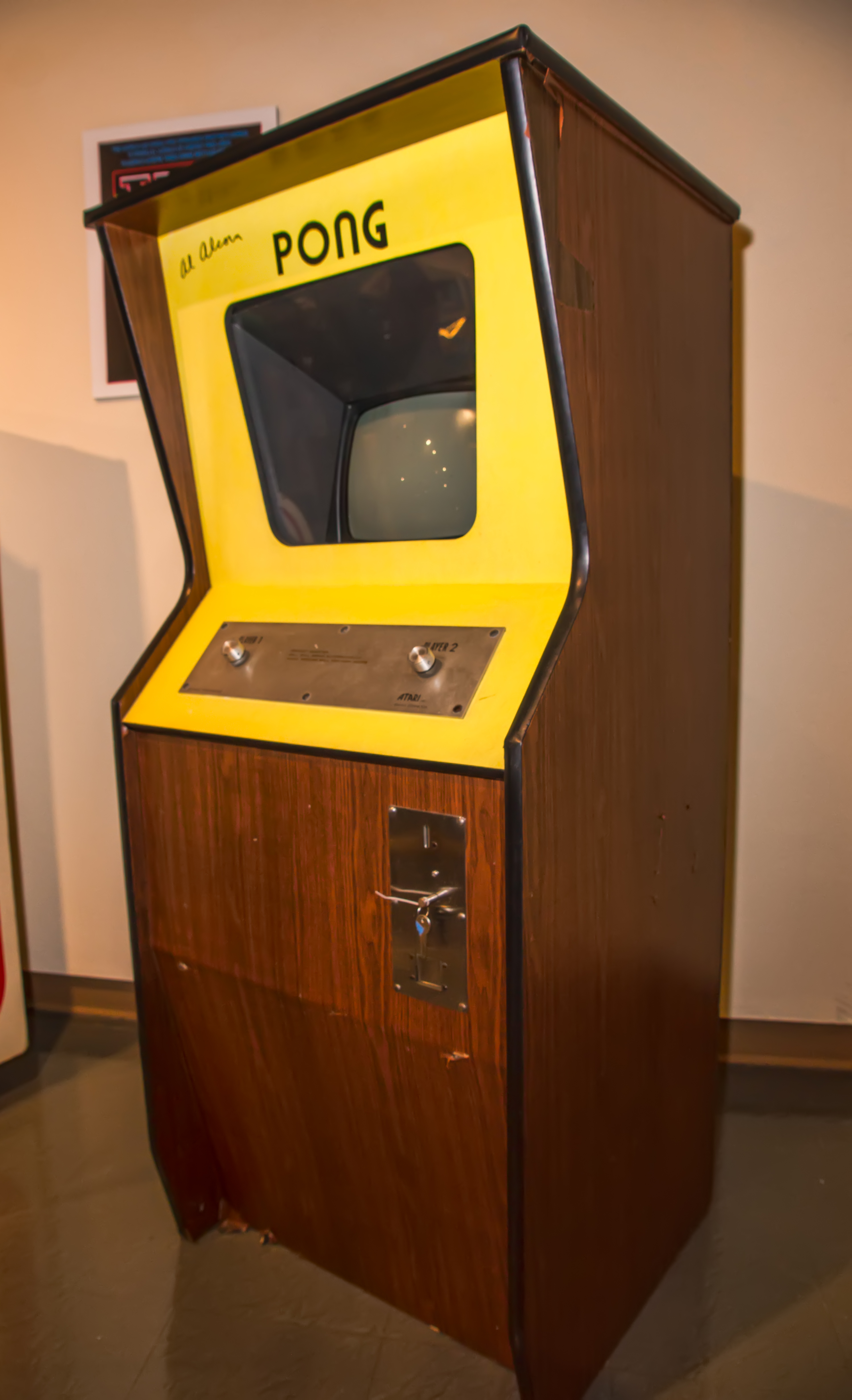
The original Pong upright cabinet

Bushnell began seeking other partners outside of Nutting, and approached pinball game manufacturer Bally Manufacturing, who indicated interest in funding future efforts in arcade games by Bushnell and Dabney if Nutting was not involved. The two quit Nutting and established offices for Syzygy in Santa Clara, at that point not yet taking a salary since they had no products. Bally then offered them US$4,000 a month for six months to design a new video game and a new pinball machine. With those funds, they hired Al Alcorn, a former co-worker at Ampex, as their first design engineer. Initially wanting to start Syzygy off with a driving game, Bushnell had concerns that it might be too complicated for Alcorn's first game.

In May 1972, Bushnell had seen a demonstration of the Magnavox Odyssey, which included a tennis game. According to Alcorn, Bushnell decided to have him produce an arcade version of the Odyssey's Tennis game, which would become known as Pong. Bushnell had Alcorn use Dabney's video circuit concepts to help develop the game, believing it would be a first prototype. However, Alcorn's success impressed both Bushnell and Dabney, leading them to believe they had a major success on hand and prepared to offer the game to Bally as part of the contract.

Meanwhile, Bushnell and Dabney had gone to incorporate the firm, but found that a company called Syzygy (an astronomical term) already existed in California. Bushnell enjoyed the strategy board game Go, and in considering various terms from the game, they chose to name the company atari, a Japanese term 当たり that, in the context of the game, means a state where a stone or group of stones is imminently in danger of being taken by one's opponent (equivalent to the concept of check in chess). Other terms Bushnell had offered included sente (when a Go player has the initiative; Bushnell would use this term years later to name another company of his) and hane (a Go move to go around an opponent's pieces). Atari was incorporated in the state of California on June 27, 1972.

Bushnell and Dabney offered to license Pong to both Bally and its Midway subsidiary, but both companies rejected it because it required two players. Instead, Bushnell and Dabney opted to create a test unit themselves and see how it was received at a local establishment. By August 1972, the first Pong arcade cabinet was completed. It consisted of a black and white television from Walgreens, the special game hardware, and a coin mechanism from a laundromat on the side, which featured a milk carton inside to catch coins. It was placed at Andy Capp's, a local tavern in Sunnyvale, to test its viability. The test was extremely successful, so the company created twelve more test units, ten of which were distributed across other local bars. They found that the machines were averaging around US$400 a week each; in several cases, when bar owners reported that the machines were malfunctioning, Alcorn found that it was because the coin collector had been overflowing with quarters, shorting out the coin slot mechanism. They reported these numbers to Bally, who still had not decided on taking the license. Bushnell and Dabney realized that they needed to expand on the game, but formally needed to get out of their contract with Bally. Bushnell told Bally that they could offer to make another game for them, but only if they rejected Pong; Bally agreed, letting Atari off the hook for the pinball machine design as well.

After talks to release Pong through Nutting and several other companies broke down, Bushnell and Dabney decided to release the game on their own, and Atari, Inc. transformed into a coin-op design and production company. Using investments and funds from a coin-operated machine route, they leased a former concert hall and roller rink in Santa Clara to produce Pong cabinets with hired help for the production line. Bushnell had also set up arrangements with local coin-op-game distributors to help move units. Atari shipped their first commercial Pong unit in November 1972. Over 2,500 Pong cabinets were made in 1973, and by the end of its production in 1974, Atari had made over 8,000 Pong cabinets.

Atari could not produce Pong cabinets fast enough to meet demand, leading to a number of existing companies in the electro-mechanical games industry and new ventures to produce their own versions of Pong. Ralph H. Baer, who had patented the concepts behind the Odyssey through his employer Sanders Associates, believed that Pong and these other games infringed on his ideas. Magnavox filed suit against Atari and others in April 1974 for patent infringement. Under legal counsel's advice, Bushnell opted to have Atari settle out of court with Magnavox by June 1976, agreeing to pay $1,500,000 in eight installments for a perpetual license for Baer's patents, and to share technical information and grant a license to use the technology found in all current Atari products and any new products announced between June 1, 1976, and June 1, 1977.

=== Early arcade and home games (1973–1976) ===
Around 1973, Bushnell began to expand out the company, moving their corporate headquarters to Los Gatos. Bushnell contracted graphic design artist George Opperman, who ran his own design firm, to create a logo for Atari. Opperman has stated that the logo that was selected was based on the letter "A", but considering Atari's success with Pong, created the logo to fit the "A" shape, with two players on opposite sides of a center line. However, some within Atari at the time dispute this, stating that Opperman had provided several different possible designs, and that this was the one selected by Bushnell and others. The logo first appeared on Atari's arcade game Space Race in 1973, and became known as the "Fuji" due to its resemblance to Mount Fuji. In 1976, Atari hired Opperman to establish the company's own art and design division.

From late 1972 to early 1973, a rift in the business relationship between Bushnell and Dabney began to develop, with Dabney believing he had been pushed to the side by Bushnell, who saw Dabney as a potential roadblock to his larger plans for Atari. By March 1973, Dabney formally left Atari, selling his portion of the company for US$250,000. While Dabney would continue to work for Bushnell on other ventures, including Pizza Time Theaters, he had a falling out with Bushnell and ultimately left the video game industry.

In mid-1973, Atari acquired Cyan Engineering, a computer engineering firm founded by Steve Mayer and Larry Emmons, following a consulting contract with Atari. Bushnell established Atari's internal Grass Valley Think Tank at Cyan to promote research and development of new games and products.

In September 1973, Atari secretly spawned a "competitor" called Kee Games, headed by Bushnell's next door neighbor Joe Keenan, to circumvent pinball distributors' insistence on exclusive distribution deals. Both Atari and Kee could market (virtually) the same game to different distributors, with each getting an "exclusive" deal. Kee was further led by Atari employees: Steve Bristow (a developer that worked under Alcorn on arcade games), Bill White, and Gil Williams. While early Kee games were near-copies of Atari's own games, Kee began developing their own titles, which drew distributor interest to the subsidiary and helped Bushnell realize the disruption of the exclusive distribution deals.

In 1974, Atari began to see financial struggles, and Bushnell was forced to lay off half the staff. Atari was facing increased competition from new arcade game producers, many which made clones of Pong and other Atari games. An accounting mistake caused the company to lose money on the release of Gran Trak 10. Atari also tried to open Atari Japan, a division to sell their games in Japan, but the venture had several roadblocks. In a 2018 interview, Alcorn described the situation as "an utter disaster beyond recognition". Bushnell said, "We didn't realize that Japan was a closed market, and so we were in violation of all kinds of rules and regulations of the Japanese, and they were starting to give us a real bad time." Ron Gordon, who had established his own international distribution company, Multi-National Corporation, learned of Atari's problems in international markets, and in 1973 introduced himself to Bushnell to help. Gordon worked on commission through his company, helping Atari sell to Europe, as well as reducing their costs by shipping only the circuit boards for their arcade games and letting local manufacturers supply the chassis and display. John Wakefield, Atari's first president, believed that the company should own its own international distribution channels, establishing Atari Japan and Atari Pacific and Computer Games, Ltd, for Hawaii and South Korea, but these failed to gain interest and contributed to Atari's 1974 financial issues. Gordon urged Bushnell to fire Wakefield due to the 1974 financials, and following that, Gordon was temporarily named president of Atari as to let go of the relatively new management staff and sell off the international sales subsidiaries. After Atari Japan was sold to Namco for $500,000, Namco would be the exclusive distributor of Atari's games in Japan. Bushnell has claimed that deals arranged by Gordon saved Atari.

Gordon further suggested that Kee Games be merged into Atari in September 1974, just ahead of the release of Tank in November of that year. Tank was a success in the arcade, and Atari was able to reestablish its financial stability by the end of 1974. In the merger, Joe Keenan was kept on as president of Atari while Bushnell stayed as CEO.

Having avoided bankruptcy, Atari continued to expand on its arcade game offerings in 1975. The additional financial stability also allowed the company to pursue new product ideas. One of these a home version of Pong, a concept that Atari had first considered as early as 1973. The cost of integrated circuits to support a home version had fallen enough to be suitable for a home console by then, and initial design work on console began in earnest in late 1974 by Alcorn, Harold Lee and Bob Brown. Atari struggled to find a distributor for the console, but eventually arranged a deal with Sears to produce 150,000 units by the 1975 holiday season. Atari was able to meet Sears' order with additional $900,000 investments during 1975. The home Pong console (branded as Sears Tele-Game) was a high-demand product that season, and resulted in Atari having a viable home console division in addition to their arcade division. By 1976, Atari began releasing home Pong consoles, including Pong variants, under their own brand name. The success of home Pong drew a similar range of competitors to this market, including Coleco with their Telstar series of consoles.

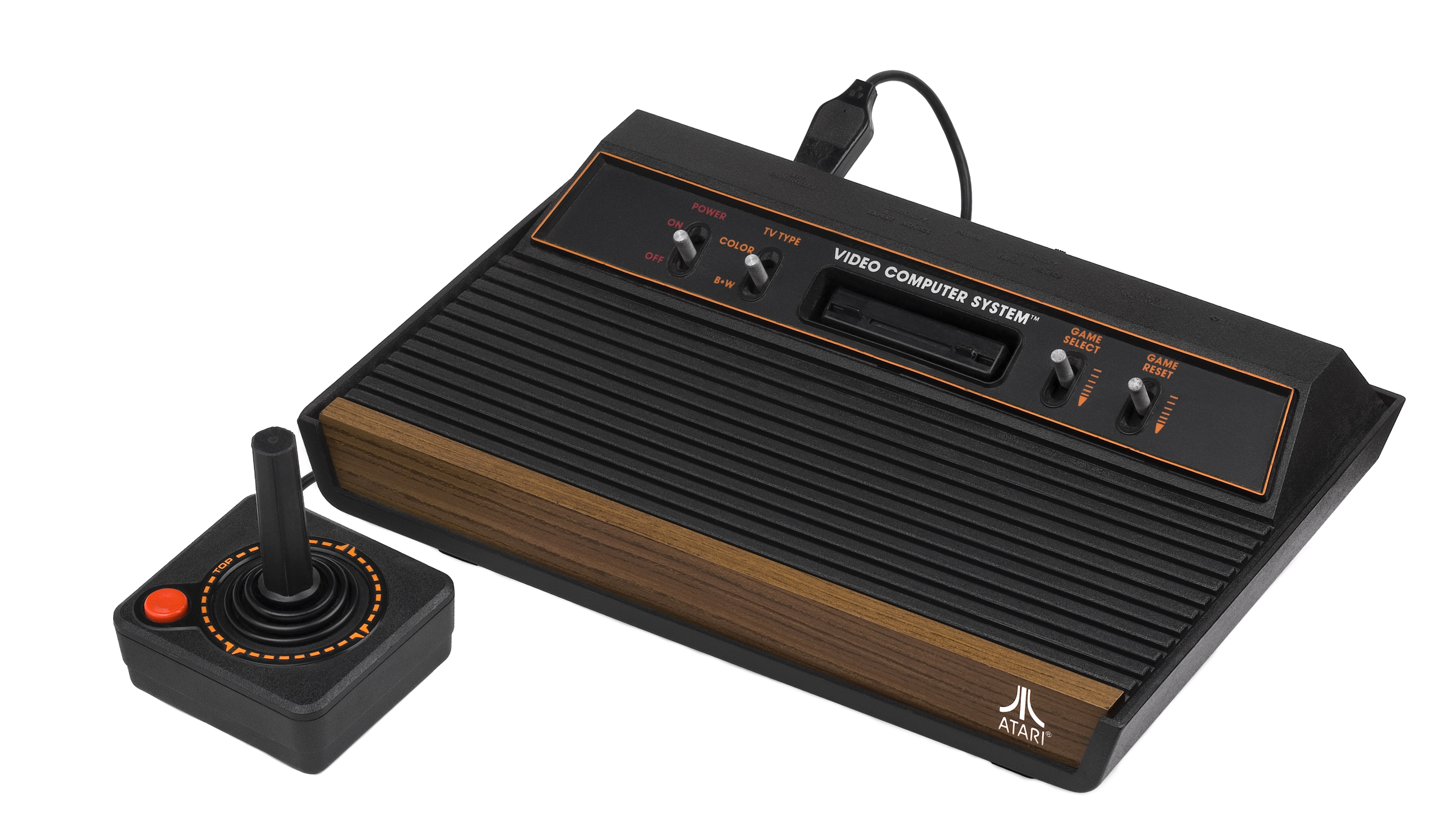
The third version of the Atari Video Computer System sold from 1980 to 1982

In 1975, Bushnell started an effort to produce a flexible video game console capable of playing all four of Atari's then-current games. Bushnell was concerned that arcade games took about $250,000 to develop and had about a 10% chance of being successful. Similarly, dedicated home consoles had cost about $100,000 to design but, with increased competition, had a limited practical shelf life of a few months. Instead, a programmable console with swappable games would be far more lucrative. Development took place at Cyan Engineering, which initially had serious difficulties trying to produce such a machine. However, in early 1976, MOS Technology released the first inexpensive microprocessor, the 6502, which had sufficient performance for Atari's needs. Atari hired Joe Decuir and Jay Miner to develop the hardware and custom Television Interface Adaptor for this new console. Their project, under the codename of "Stella", would become known as the Atari Video Computer System (Atari VCS).

=== Workplace culture ===
Atari, as a private company under Bushnell, gained a reputation for its relaxed employee policies in areas such as formal hours and dress codes, and company-sponsored recreational activities involving alcohol, marijuana, and hot tubs. Board and management meetings to discuss new ideas moved from formal events at hotel meeting rooms to more casual gatherings at Bushnell's home, Cyan Engineering, and a coastal resort in Pajaro Dunes. Dress codes were considered atypical for a professional setting, with most working in jeans and T-shirts. Many of the workers hired early on to construct games were hippies who knew enough to help to solder components together and took minimal wages. Several former employees, speaking in years that followed, described this as the common culture of the 1970s and not unique to Atari.

This approach changed in 1978, after Ray Kassar was brought on from Warner initially to help with marketing, but eventually took on a larger role in the company, displacing Bushnell and Keenan, and instituting more formal employee policies for the company.

== As a subsidiary of Warner Communications ==
=== Under Nolan Bushnell (1976–1978) ===
Before entering the home console market, Atari recognized they needed additional capital to support this market; the company had acquired smaller investments through 1975, but needed a larger infusion of funds. Bushnell had considered going public and tried to sell the company to MCA and Disney, both of whom passed. Instead, after at least six months of negotiations in 1976, Atari took an acquisition offer from Warner Communications for $28 million that was completed in November 1976, of which Bushnell received $15 million. Bushnell remained chairman and CEO, while Keenan remained president. Atari had about $40 million in annual revenue; for Warner, the deal represented an opportunity to buoy its underperforming film and music divisions. Along with Warner's purchase, Atari had established its new headquarters in the Moffett Park area in Sunnyvale, California.

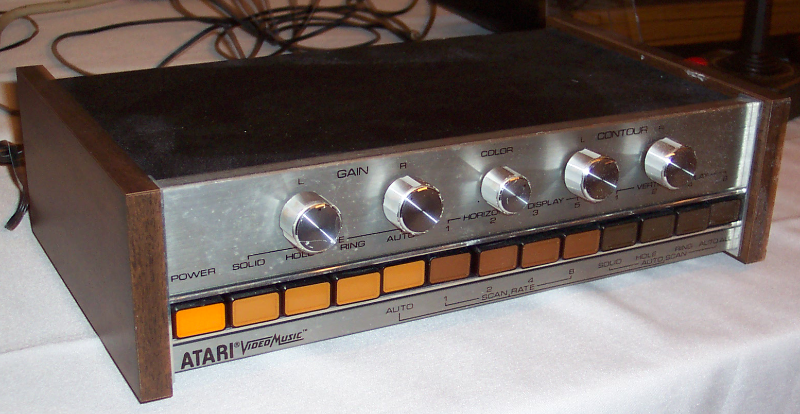
The Atari Video Music, the first commercial music visualizer

During Atari's negotiations with Warner, Fairchild Camera and Instrument announced the Fairchild Channel F, the first programmable home console that used cartridges to play different games. Following the acquisition, Warner provided Atari with $120 million for Stella's development, making it possible to complete the console by early 1977. The console's announcement, which took place on June 4, 1977, may have been delayed until after June 1 so that Atari could wait out the terms of the Magnavox settlement from the earlier Pong patent lawsuit and would not have to disclose information on it. The Atari VCS was released in September 1977. Most of the launch titles for the console were based on Atari's successful arcade games, such as Combat, which incorporated elements of both Tank and Jet Fighter. Around 400,000 Atari VCS units were produced for the 1977 holiday season, but the company had lost around $25 million due to production problems that caused some units to be delivered late to retailers.

In addition to the VCS, Atari continued to manufacture dedicated home console units through 1977; however, these were discontinued by 1978, with unsold stock destroyed soon after. Another one-off device from the consumer products division in 1977 was the Atari Video Music, a computerized device that takes an audio input and creates graphics displays to a monitor. The unit did not sell well and was discontinued in 1978.

Atari continued its arcade game line as it built up its consumer division. Breakout, released in 1976, was one of Atari's last games based on transistor–transistor logic (TTL) discrete logic design before the company transitioned to microprocessors. It was engineered by future Apple Computer co-founder Steve Wozniak, based on Bushnell's concept of a single-player Pong, and used as few TTL chips as possible from an informal challenge given to Wozniak by then-Atari employee and future Apple co-founder Steve Jobs. Breakout was successful and sold around 11,000 units, but Atari still struggled to meet demand. Atari exported a limited number of units to Namco via its prior Atari Japan venture, which led Namco to create its own clone of the game to meet demand in Japan, helping establish it as a major company in the Japanese video game industry. Subsequently, Atari moved to microprocessors for its arcade games such as Cops 'N Robbers, Sprint 2, Tank 8, and Night Driver.

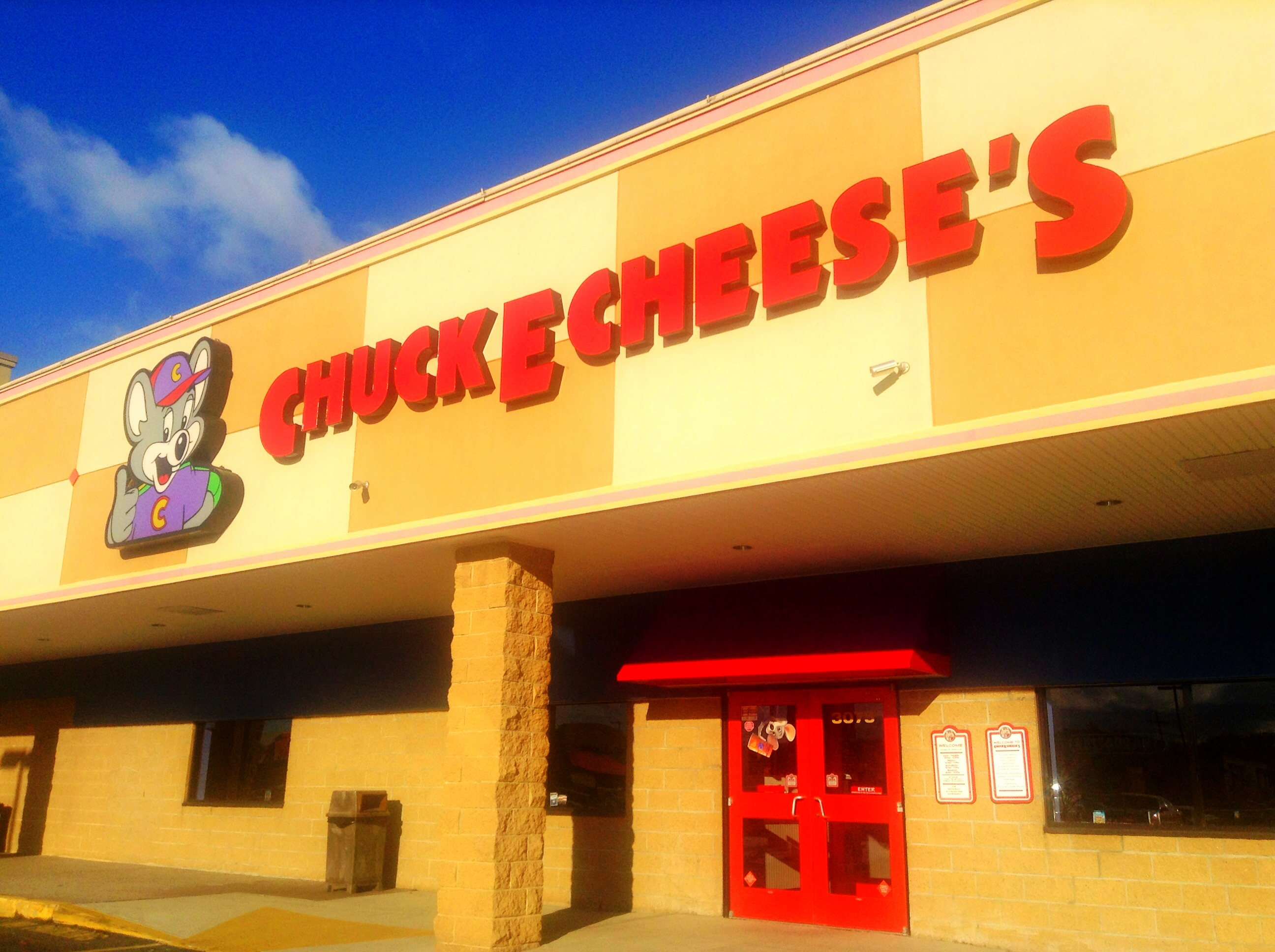
The Chuck E. Cheese franchise was first developed by Bushnell at Atari in 1977.

Alongside continuing work in arcade game development and their preparations to launch the Atari VCS, Atari launched two more ventures in 1977. The first was the Atari Pinball division, which included Steve Ritchie and Eugene Jarvis. Around 1976, Atari was concerned that arcade operators had become nervous on the prospects of future arcade games, and thus launched their own pinball machines to accompany their arcade games. Atari's pinball machines were built upon the technology principles that they had learned from arcade and home console games, using solid-state electronics over electro-mechanical components to make them easier to design and repair. The division released about ten different pinball units between 1977 and 1979. Many of the machines were considered to be innovative for their time, but were difficult to produce and meet distributors' demand. The second new venture in 1977 was the first of the Pizza Time Theatre (later known as Chuck E. Cheese), based on the pizza arcade concept that Bushnell had from the start. At this stage, Atari used the concept to bypass problems with getting their arcade games placed into arcades by effectively controlling the arcade itself while also creating a family-friendly environment. The first restaurant/arcade was launched in San Jose in May 1977.

After releasing the VCS, Atari hired more programmers to start work on a second wave of games for release in 1978. In contrast to the launch titles inspired by Atari's arcade games, the second batch of games featured more novel ideas, including some based on board games, and were more difficult to sell. Warner's Manny Gerard, who oversaw Atari, brought in former Burlington Industries vice president Ray Kassar to help market Atari's products. Kassar was hired in February 1978 as president of the Atari consumer division, and helped develop a commercialization strategy for these games through 1978. Kassar also oversaw the creation of a new marketing campaign for the VCS, featuring multiple celebrities and the slogan "Don't watch TV tonight, play it." Kassar also instituted programs to increase production of the VCS and improve quality assurance of the console and games. As they approached the end of 1978, Atari had prepared 800,000 VCS units, but sales were languishing ahead of the holiday sales period.

Kassar's influence on Atari grew throughout 1978, leading to conflict between Bushnell and Warner Communications. Among other concerns about the direction Kassar was taking the company, Bushnell cautioned Warner that they needed to continue to innovate on the home console and could not simply release games for the VCS indefinitely like a music business. In a November 1978 meeting with Warner Communications, Bushnell told Gerard that they had produced far too many VCS units to be sold that season, and that Atari's consumer division would suffer a major loss. However, Kassar's marketing plan, alongside the influence of the arcade hit Space Invaders from Taito, led to a large surge in VCS sales, and Atari's consumer division ended the year with $200 million in sales. Warner removed Bushnell as chairman and co-CEO of the company, but offered to let him stay on as a director and creative consultant; Bushnell refused and left the company. Bushnell purchased the rights for Pizza Time Theatre for $500,000 from Warner before leaving. Keenan was moved to Atari's chairman, and Kassar was assigned as president after Bushnell's departure; Keenan left the company a few months later to join Bushnell in managing Pizza Time Theatre, and Kassar was promoted to CEO and chairman of Atari.

=== Under Ray Kassar (1979–1982) ===
After Bushnell's departure, Kassar implemented significant changes in the workplace culture in early 1979 to make Atari appear more professional, and cancelled several of the engineering programs that Bushnell had established. Kassar also had expressed some frustration with the programmers at Atari, and was known to have called them "spoiled brats" and "prima donnas" at times.

These changes in management style led to rising tensions from the developers at Atari, who had been used to freedom in developing their titles. One example was Superman in 1979, one of the first movie tie-ins that had been sought by Warner to accompany the release of the 1978 film. Warner, through Kassar, had pressured Warren Robinett to convert his game-in-progress Adventure from a generic adventure game to a Superman-themed title. Robinett refused, but nonetheless helped fellow programmer John Dunn develop the conversion after he volunteered. Furthermore, after Warner refused to let Atari include programmer credits into game manuals for fear that competitors may try to hire them away, Robinett secretly stuck his name into Adventure, marking one of the first known Easter eggs, to bypass this issue. The transition from Bushnell to Kassar led to a large number of departures from the company over the next few years. Four programmers — David Crane, Bob Whitehead, Larry Kaplan, and Alan Miller — whose games had contributed collectively to over 60% of Atari's game sales in 1978, left the company in mid-1979 after requesting and being denied additional compensation for their performance; they formed Activision in October of that year to make their own Atari VCS games based on their knowledge of the console. Similarly, Rob Fulop, who programmed the arcade conversion of Missile Command for the VCS in 1981 that sold over 2.5 million units, received only a minimal bonus that year, and left with other disgruntled Atari programmers to form Imagic in 1981.

In 1979, the Atari coin-op division began releasing arcade games incorporating vector graphics displays after the success of the Cinematronics game Space Wars in 1977. Their first vector graphics game, Lunar Lander, was a modest success, but their second arcade title, Asteroids, was highly popular, displacing Space Invaders as the most popular game in the United States. Atari produced over 70,000 Asteroids cabinets, and made an estimated $150 million from sales. Asteroids, along with Space Invaders, helped usher in the golden age of arcade video games, which lasted until around 1983; Atari contributed several more games that were considered part of this golden age, including Missile Command, Centipede, and Tempest.

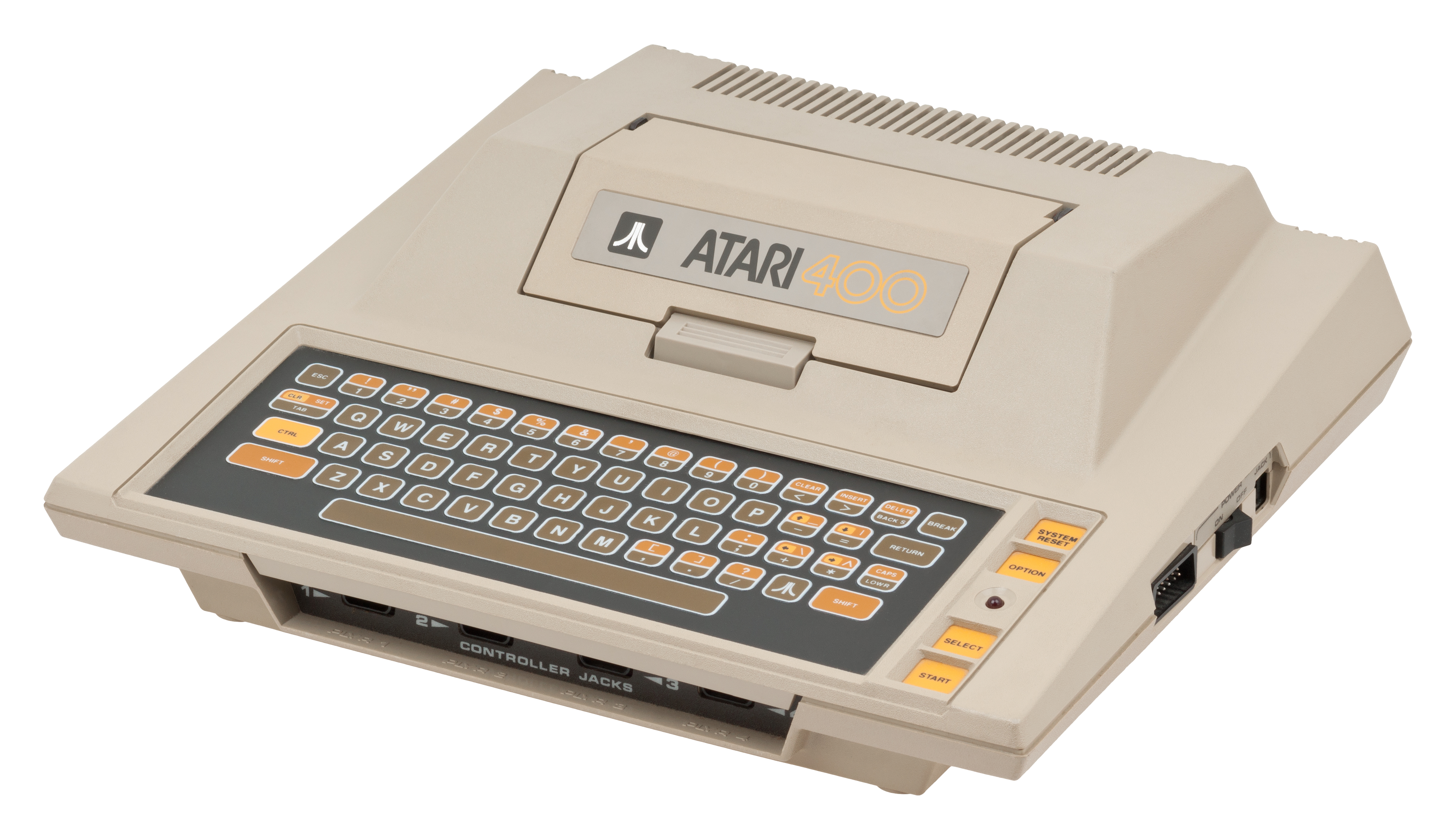
The Atari 400 was released in 1979.

Work on a successor to the Atari VCS began shortly after the system was introduced in mid-1977. The original development team, which included Meyer, Miner and Decuir, estimated that the VCS had a lifespan of about three years, and decided to build the most powerful machine they could when given that time frame. They set a goal to be able to support concurrent arcade games, as well as features of personal computers such as the Apple II. The project resulted in the first home computers from Atari, the Atari 800 and 400, both launched in 1979. These systems were mostly closed systems, and most of the initial games were developed by Atari, drawing from programmers from the VCS line. Sales into early 1980 were poor, and there was little to distinguish the computer line from the console products of the time. In March 1980, the company released Star Raiders, a space combat game developed by Doug Neubauer based on the Star Trek game that had been popular on mainframe computers. Star Raiders became the Atari 400/800's system seller, but its success emphasized the lack of software for the computers due to the system's closed nature and the limited rate at which Atari's programmers could produce titles. Third-party programmers found means to get technical information about the computer specifications either directly from Atari employees or from reverse engineering. By late 1980, third-party applications and games began to emerge for the 8-bit computer family, and the specialized magazine ANALOG Computing was established for Atari programmers to share programming information. While Atari did not formally release development information, they supported this external community by launching the Atari Program Exchange (APX) in 1981, a mail-order service through which programmers could offer their applications and games to other users of Atari's 8-bit computers. By this point, Atari's computers were facing new competition from the VIC-20.

A short-lived Atari Electronics division was created to make electronic games, and ran from 1979 to 1981. They successfully released one product: a handheld version of Atari's arcade game Touch Me, which played similar to Simon, in 1979. The division began work on Cosmos, a system that was to combine LED lights and a holographic screen. Atari had promoted the game at the 1981 CES, but opted not to follow through on releasing it following Alcorn's departure in 1981, and closed down the Electronics division.

Moving into 1980, the VCS still lacked a system-selling game. After Space Invaders had hit arcades in 1979, Warner instructed Kassar to try to get the rights to a home conversion for the game from Taito; around this time, Rick Maurer had already begun prototype work for a possible game on his own. Once Kassar has secured the rights, Maurer was able to transfer his work to a form for the VCS, and Space Invaders for the VCS was released in March 1980. The game became the VCS's "killer app", helping sell the console alongside the game, and made Atari an estimated $100 million. It also set a roadmap for future game releases on the VCS under Kassar, with more scheduled release plans throughout the year and Atari looking for more licensed arcade conversions and tie-in media.

Until 1980, the Atari VCS was the only major programmable console on the market, and Atari the only supplier for its games; that same year, however, Atari began to experience its first major competition as Mattel Electronics brought the Intellivision to market. Around this time, Activision also released its first set of third-party games for the Atari VCS. Atari took legal action against Activision, first by trying to tarnish the company's reputation, then by accusing Activision's four programmers of stealing trade secrets and violating non-disclosure agreements. This lawsuit was eventually settled out of court in 1982, with Activision agreeing to pay a small license fee to Atari for every game sold. This effectively validated Activision's development model and made it the first third-party developer in the video game industry.

In 1980, Namco produced the arcade game Pac-Man, which reached the United States market by the end of the year. Pac-Man soon became a nationwide success, surpassing the popularity of Asteroids and creating a wave of "Pac-Mania". Atari was able to secure an exclusive deal with Namco to convert Pac-Man to home systems, starting with the Atari VCS version. Atari management believed that the game would be a surefire hit in the same manner as Space Invaders, but the game exceeded the hardware capabilities of the VCS. While Tod Frye was able to get a version of Pac-Man on the VCS within the system's limitations, the resulting game was critically panned for technical issues, such as the excessive flickering of the ghosts. Pac-Man was released in March 1982, with Atari running several promotions to increase sales. It sold over seven million units and ultimately was the best-selling VCS game, bringing in over $200 million. However, due to its poor technical implementation, the game led many consumers to be more cautious on rushing to purchase new games in the future, and tarnished Atari's image at a time when the company was trying to compete against low-quality third-party titles that were starting to flood the market.

In 1981, Atari discovered that General Computer Corporation (GCC) had developed hardware that could be installed onto arcade games to give operators additional options to modify the game, such as their Super Missile Attack board, which modified Atari's Missile Command. Atari initially filed suit to stop GCC's products, but as they learned more about their products, they recognized that GCC had talented engineers, as one of their other products, a modification board for Pac-Man, was sold back to Midway and eventually became the basis of Ms. Pac-Man. Atari settled with GCC out of court and brought the company on in a consulting position. GCC developed arcade and VCS games for Atari, and also programmed most of the games for the upcoming Atari 5200 system.

Atari launched its second major programmable console, the Atari 5200, in late 1982. It was based on the same design features that had gone into the Atari 800 and Atari 400 computers, but repackaged as a home console. Alongside the 5200's release, Atari announced that it would rebranding the Atari VCS as the Atari 2600 to create a more consistent product naming system. The Atari 5200 did not do well on the market, as it lacked backward compatibility with Atari VCS/2600 cartridges, a feature offered by the ColecoVision. The Atari 5200 only sold about a million units before it was discontinued in 1984.

By the end of 1982, Atari had hired 4,000 additional employees for a total of 10,000 across its three divisions, each of which focused on arcade games, consumer home consoles, and home computers. The company had more than fifty facilities in the Silicon Valley area. For the first nine months of 1982, Atari contributed half of Warner's $2.9 billion revenue and a third of their $471 million operating profit. However, the company was seeing a high rate of turnover in management positions, which Kassar attributed to the rapid growth of the company. As an industry, the video game market reached about $1.7 billion in 1982 and was expected to reach $3 billion in 1984, rivalling revenues of the film industry, and making video games an overall lucrative prospect.

=== The video game crash of 1983 ===
In October 1981, in an attempt to remain competitive against Mattel's Intellivision, Atari requested all of its distributors to commit to orders for home console games in 1982, so as to allow the company to anticipate production numbers and meet expected demand. Distributors expected Atari's games to do well and ordered in large volumes, placing more orders than expected given Atari's past failures to meet demand. By the middle of 1982, a new home console marketplace had appeared, which one distributor called "a totally different business". In addition to Mattel, Coleco had introduced the ColecoVision, which shipped in August 1982 with an arcade conversion of the popular Donkey Kong as a pack-in game, as well as add-ons that could play Atari 2600 games. Further, Activision, Imagic, along with other third-party game developers like Parker Brothers, had begun releasing Atari 2600 titles that rivaled Atari's own games, reducing its market share of games to 40%. Distributors began cancelling the Atari orders they had placed the prior year, which Gerard said they were "blind-sided" by, having never faced this type of competition before.

Additionally, around October 1981, Atari looked to other licensed properties for games. They secured the rights for Raiders of the Lost Ark in late 1981, shortly after the release of the blockbuster film earlier that year. Similarly, after the film E.T. the Extra-Terrestrial was released in June 1982, Warner chairman Steve Ross negotiated directly with director Steven Spielberg to secure video game rights, estimated to have cost Atari $20−25 million, to make a video game based on the film. The game was programmed by Howard Scott Warshaw over a period of five weeks in advance of the 1982 holiday season. Raiders and E.T. were released in November and December 1982, respectively. As distributors had already cancelled orders, these and other games began to stockpile in Atari's warehouses without any sellers. Neither game sold as much as Atari had expected. Notably, E.T. was critically panned and later became known as one of the worst games ever made. Despite selling 2.6 million copies in 1982, it suffered massive returns in 1983, making it a financial failure.

In December 1982, Warner Communications announced that it expected significant decline in investor earnings of about 40% for the fourth quarter of the year, mostly as a result of slower game sales from Atari. Warner still remained confident that it would see a 10 to 15% growth through 1982, which it considered fair given the early 1980s recession. However, earlier in 1982, Warner had expected a 50% growth and used Atari's profits to help support its other media subsidiaries, and analysts were less confident in Warner's current outlook; one asked, "Why did it happen so quickly? And why were they not in tune with it while it was building?" Later that month, Warner announced that Kassar, along with one other Atari executive, had sold numerous shares of Warner stock prior to the investor announcement and were engaged with insider trading. The Securities and Exchange Commission (SEC) investigated Kassar's sale and, in September 1983, fined Kassar about $81,000. Kassar signed a consent agreement neither admitting nor denying the charges.

Atari's financial troubles continued into the first quarter of 1983, with an operating loss of $45.6 million compared to an operating profit of $100 million in the same quarter in 1982. Atari was still struggling with excess inventory of its Atari 2600 games, and the Atari 5200 had not been as successful as the 2600. The golden age of arcade games was waning, and the arcade division was failing to turn a profit. Furthermore, Atari's venture into home computers was not as successful, as they were losing a price war with Commodore International.

Atari had gained a poor reputation in the industry. One dealer told InfoWorld in early 1984 that "It has totally ruined my business ... Atari has ruined all the independents." A non-Atari executive stated, "There were so many screaming, shouting, threatening dialogues, it's unbelievable that any company in America could conduct itself the way Atari conducted itself. Atari used threats, intimidation and bullying. It's incredible that anything could be accomplished. Many people left Atari. There was incredible belittling and humiliation of people. We'll never do business with them again." In early 1984, John J. Anderson wrote that "Atari has never made a dime in microcomputers [...] Many of the people I spoke to at Atari between 1980 and 1983 had little or no idea what the products they were selling were all about, or who if anyone would care. In one case, we were fed mis- and disinformation on a frighteningly regular basis, from a highly-placed someone supposedly in charge of all publicity concerning the computer systems. And chilling as the individual happenstance was, it seems to have been endemic at Atari at the time."

Despite these losses, Atari remained the number one console maker in every market except Japan, where Nintendo had released its first programmable video game console, the Family Computer, on July 15, 1983. Looking to sell the console in international markets that same year, Nintendo offered a licensing deal in which Atari would build and sell the system while paying Nintendo a royalty. The deal was in the works throughout 1983, and the two companies tentatively decided to sign the agreement at the June 1983 Consumer Electronics Show. However, it was at that same show that Coleco demonstrated its new Adam computer with Nintendo's Donkey Kong. Kassar was furious, as Atari owned the exclusive rights to publish Donkey Kong for computers, which he accused Nintendo of violating. Nintendo, in turn, criticized Coleco, which only owned the console rights to the game; Coleco, however, had legal grounds to challenge the claim, since Atari had only purchased the floppy disk rights to the game, while the Adam version was cartridge-based. Negotiations became protracted after Kassar's departure from Atari in mid-1983. With any deal unlikely to be realized before year-end sales, Nintendo dropped out and later worked through their Nintendo of America subsidiary to release the console, now known as the Nintendo Entertainment System, on their own in 1985.

In 1983, Atari set up Studio Games, a partnership with MCA Videogames (a division of MCA Inc.), which gave them access to properties handled by MCA's sister studio Universal Pictures.

Kassar eventually resigned as CEO of Atari in July 1983 over mounting financial losses; Warner replaced him with James J. Morgan, a vice president from Philip Morris Inc. Stating that "one company can't have seven presidents", Morgan stated a goal of more closely integrating the company's divisions to end "the fiefdoms and the politics and all the things that caused the problems". Morgan implemented processes to reduce operating costs at Atari, including laying off about 3,000 jobs and moving 4,000 more manufacturing positions to Asia.

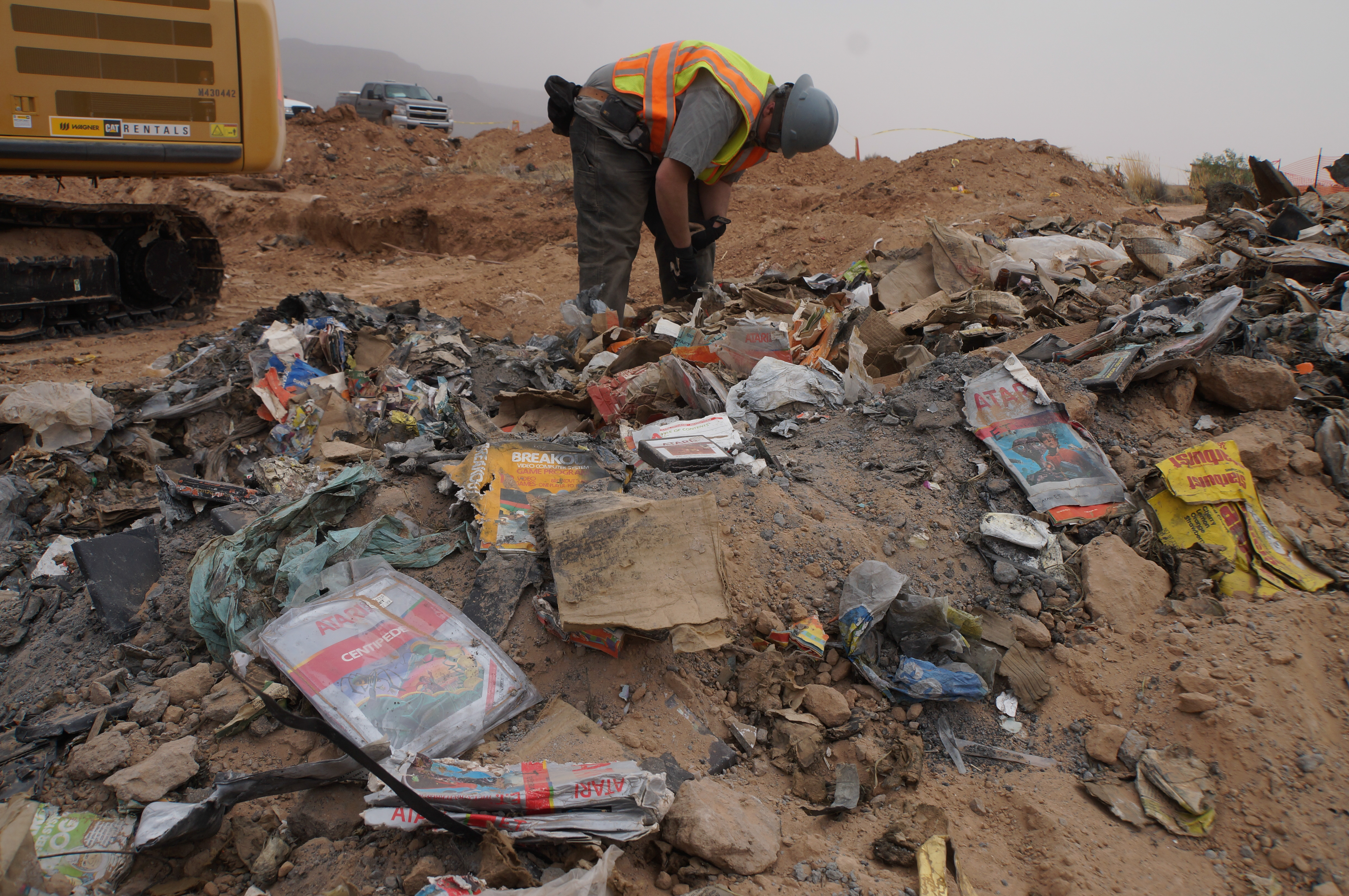
Excavation of the Atari video game burial in 2014

Atari's financial problems continued throughout the rest of 1983, with second quarter losses of $310 million. In September 1983, the company discreetly buried about 700,000 units of its unsold stock in a landfill near Alamogordo, New Mexico; this event became part of an urban legend that millions of unsold cartridges, mostly of E.T., were buried there.

In the United States, Atari's problems reverberated across the entire game industry, as consumer confidence in video games had weakened significantly, contributing significantly to the video game crash of 1983. Retailers became wary of selling video games, making it difficult for console and video game manufacturers to sell their products. Furthermore, the rising popularity of home computers drove sales away from game consoles. To clear stock as to make way to new games, retailers also heavily discounted consoles and games, which also hurt these companies financially. Many of the new companies that had sprung up to take advantage of the rising growth of video games prior to 1983 shut down, liquidating their assets and further contributing to the excess unsold stock. Established companies like Atari faced difficulty in selling their products against these volumes, which further contributed to their losses. By the end of 1983, Atari reported a total loss of $538 million, compared to the $1.7 billion operating profit in 1982.

Despite its financial issues, Atari continued to innovate. In March 1983, it established the Ataritel division to develop telephones with screens and computer features with consumer-ready products to reach market by 1984. In October 1983, Atari created its Atarisoft division, which produced software from its own library for its rival systems, including for computers from Commodore, Apple, Texas Instruments, and IBM, as well as console games for ColecoVision. GCC, inspired by the Atari 2600 add-ons available for the ColecoVision and Atari 5200, began work on designing a new console that would be more advanced than the 2600 while still support direct compatibility with its games. The result of this project was the Atari 7800 ProSystem, which was announced in early 1984. Morgan had shut down the Atari 5200 production towards Atari 7800 manufacturing for its mid-1984 release, but with Warner's sale of the company in June 1984, the launch was cancelled. The Atari 7800 was later launched under Atari Corporation in May 1986.

=== Breakup and sale (1984) ===
By the end of 1983, Warner's stock price slid from $60 to $20, and the company began searching for a buyer for Atari. When Texas Instruments exited the home-computer market in November 1983 due to its price war with Commodore, many believed that Atari would be next. Its Atarisoft games for rival computers sold well, and a rumor stated that Atari planned to discontinue hardware and only sell software. Morgan stated that he expected to bring Atari back to profitability by mid-1984, but warned that he was expecting more losses for the first six months of the year.

On July 3, 1984, in a surprise announcement, Warner announced that they had sold off the assets of the consumer electronics and home computer divisions of Atari, which included the console and computer production, game development, and Atarisoft divisions, to former Commodore International CEO Jack Tramiel in exchange for taking on roughly $240 million in debt held by Warner. Tramiel merged these assets into his own Tramel Technology Limited, which he renamed Atari Corporation. In the transition, Morgan was given "a leave of several months", with Tramiel's son Sam Tramiel and his other aides already taking leadership of the company. Warner renamed Atari, Inc. to Atari Games, which now primarily consisted of the coin-operated games, arcade operations, and Ataritel divisions. Ataritel was sold to Mitsubishi later in 1984; Mitsubishi released one of the first digital videophones based on Atari's original designs under the brand Lumaphone by 1986.

Under Tramiel, Atari Corporation initially focused heavily on home computers before it revisited game consoles, including the Atari 2600 Jr., a redesign of the Atari 2600. However, it eventually dropped out of the hardware market by 1996, following the failure of its Atari Jaguar console. In 1998, Atari Corporation's properties were acquired by Hasbro Interactive; in 2001, they were sold to Infogrames, which would rebrand itself as Atari SA, and held most of the intellectual property rights to the console games developed by Atari, Inc.

In 1985, Warner created a new joint venture with Namco, subsequently named Atari Games Corporation, and transferred the coin-operated games division to the new entity. Namco owned the majority stake in Atari Games Corporation, while Warner retained a 40% share. Namco later lost interest in operating Atari Games and sold 33% of its shares to a group of employees led by then-president Hideyuki Nakajima in 1986. As the company was now split between Warner (40%), Namco (40%), and the employees (20%), and none of them held a controlling share, Atari Games effectively became an independent company. The company re-entered home console publishing as well, but were unable to use the Atari name in the home market as the rights were held by Atari Corporation; to resolve this issue, they launched the Tengen subsidiary for console publishing. In 1994, Time Warner, as it had become known following its merger with Time Inc., bought out Namco's share of Atari Games, placing it under their new Time Warner Interactive label. After only two years, it was sold again to WMS Industries in 1996, and made part of Midway Games when that company was spun off as an independent company in 1998 as the Midway Games West studio. The studio was disbanded in 2003, marking the end of the last remaining part of the original Atari. The Atari Games library was retained by Midway until 2009, when Midway was sold to Warner Bros. Interactive Entertainment amidst financial troubles.

== Products ==
=== Hardware products ===
- Home Pong (1975)
- Stunt Cycle (1976)
- Atari Video Music (1977)
- Video Pinball (1977)
- Atari 2600 (1977)
- Atari 8-bit computers (1979)
- Atari 2700 (cancelled)
- Atari Cosmos (cancelled)
- Atari 5200 (1982)

=== Arcade and other amusement games ===
Arcade games

- Anti-Aircraft
- Asteroids
- Asteroids Deluxe
- Atari Baseball
- Atari Basketball
- Atari Football
- Atari Soccer
- Avalanche
- Battlezone
- Black Widow
- Breakout
- Canyon Bomber
- Centipede
- Cloak & Dagger
- Cops N Robbers
- Crash 'N Score
- Crystal Castles
- Destroyer
- Dominos
- Drag Race
- Fire Truck
- Firefox
- Flyball
- Food Fight
- Goal IV
- Gotcha
- Gran Trak 10
- Gran Trak 20
- Gravitar
- Hi-way
- I, Robot
- Indy 4
- Indy 800
- Jet Fighter
- LeMans
- Liberator
- Lunar Lander
- Major Havoc
- Marble Madness
- Millipede
- Missile Command
- Monte Carlo
- Night Driver
- Orbit
- Outlaw
- Pin-Pong
- Pong
- Pong Doubles
- Pool Shark
- Pursuit
- Quadrapong
- Quantum
- Quiz Show
- Qwak!
- Rebound
- Red Baron
- Return of the Jedi
- Shark Jaws
- Sky Diver
- Sky Raider
- Space Duel
- Space Race
- Sprint 1
- Sprint 2
- Sprint 4
- Sprint 8
- Star Wars
- Starship 1
- Steeplechase
- Stunt Cycle
- Subs
- Super Breakout
- Super Bug
- Super Pong
- Tank
- Tank II
- Tank 8
- Tempest
- Tournament Table
- Triple Hunt
- Tunnel Hunt
- Ultra Tank
- Video Pinball
- Warlords

Unreleased arcade prototypes

- Akka Arrh
- Atari Mini Golf
- Cannonball
- Cloud 9
- Firebeast
- Maze Invaders
- Missile Command 2
- Runaway
- Sebring
- Solar War
- Wolf Pack

Pinball machines

- Airborne Avenger
- The Atarians
- Hercules
- Middle Earth
- Road Runner
- Space Riders
- Superman
- Time 2000

=== Software ===
Atari's software is organized by platform:

- List of Atari 2600 games
- List of Atari 5200 games
- Atari 8-bit computer software
- List of Atarisoft games

== See also ==
- History of video games
