= Stunt Cycle =

1976 video game

- Developer: Atari, Inc.
- Publishers: Atari, Inc.
- Platforms: Arcade, Atari 2600
- Release: NA: January 1976
- Genre: Action
- Mode: Single-player

Stunt Cycle is an arcade video game by Atari, Inc. released in 1976. In the style of the Evel Knievel craze of the mid-1970s, the game allows the player to perform motorcycle jumping stunts. The arcade cabinet is modeled like a motorcycle handlebar, and the player twists the right side for acceleration. The monitor is a 19-inch black and white cathode-ray tube with a black and white overlay. It accommodates 1 player or 2 players alternating.

Atari released two dedicated home console versions of Stunt Cycle in 1977.

== Gameplay ==
The screen is divided into three horizontal platforms connected by tubes on the monitor overlay. The player can only accelerate and brake, with no steering. The motorcycle automatically drives across each platform in sequence: left to right, right to left, then left to right again. The bottom platform has a line of parked buses between two ramps, and the goal is to repeatedly jump the buses and land safely.

Upon starting, the player must jump over 8 buses. If successful, another bus is added and at 23 buses, one additional credit or crash is added. Otherwise, crashing three times or jumping over 27 buses ends the game.

Accelerating too quickly results in a wheelie and, if speed is not decreased, flipping over backward and crashing. Speed carries over from one platform to the next. On the third platform and thereafter, the cycle must reach the landing ramp to avoid a crash.

== Home versions ==
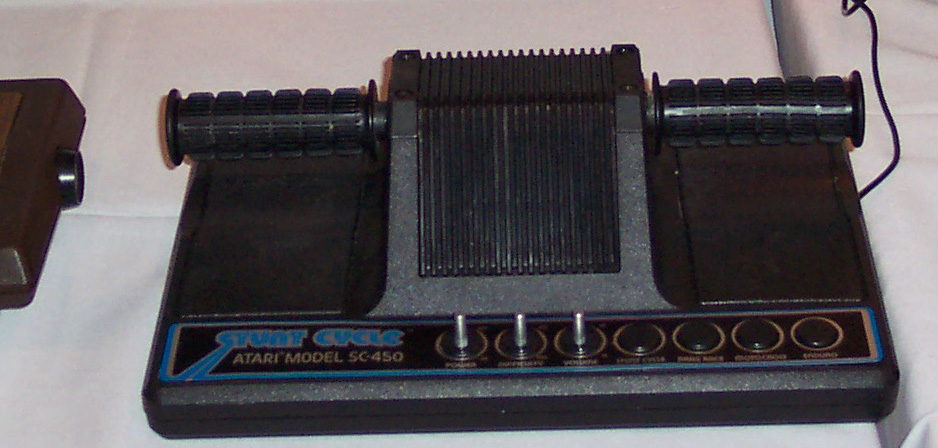
Atari's Stunt Cycle console

Two dedicated console versions were released by Atari in 1977. Atari's own branded Stunt Cycle version plays four games: a version of the original and three variants (Motocross, Enduro, and DragRace) based on the AY-3-8760 chip by General Instrument. Handlebar grips on the unit allow players to whip, wheelie, and jump up to 32 onscreen buses. The unit provides digital on-screen scoring and color graphics. The Sears Tele-Games version called Motocross Sports Center IV includes the same Stunt Cycle variants and 16 Pong games played with detachable Pong controllers (based on Atari C010765 chip for the Pong games and the GI chip AY-3-8760).

In 1980, Atari programmer Bob Polaro began to develop a Stunt Cycle port for the Atari 2600 using full color graphics. By the time it was completed, Atari had decided to turn it into a television tie-in game for the Dukes of Hazzard franchise instead. This game never progressed beyond the prototype stage and was not officially released. Bob Polaro independently released 50 copies of Stunt Cycle in 2003.
