= Indy Racing 2000 =

2000 video game

- Developer: Paradigm Entertainment
- Publisher: Infogrames
- Platform: Nintendo 64
- Release: NA: June 7, 2000
- Genre: Racing
- Modes: Single-player, multiplayer

Indy Racing 2000 is a racing game for the Nintendo 64 that was released in 2000. The game is based on the 1999 Indy Racing League and races a 20-car field. The game's modes of play include single race, Championship, Two player and Gold Cup. There are 9 tracks and 11 races. The Gold Cup mode lets the player race Midget cars, sprint cars, Formula cars, and Indy cars on fictional tracks (All but 1 are road courses).

== Reception ==
Reception

Aggregate score
Aggregator	Score
GameRankings	68%

Review scores
Publication	Score
Electronic Gaming Monthly	8/10
Game Informer	8/10
GameFan	72%
GameSpot	7.1/10
IGN	8/10
Nintendo Power	7.3/10

The game received "average" reviews according to the review aggregation website GameRankings.
