= Atari VCS (2021 console) =

Video game console developed by Atari

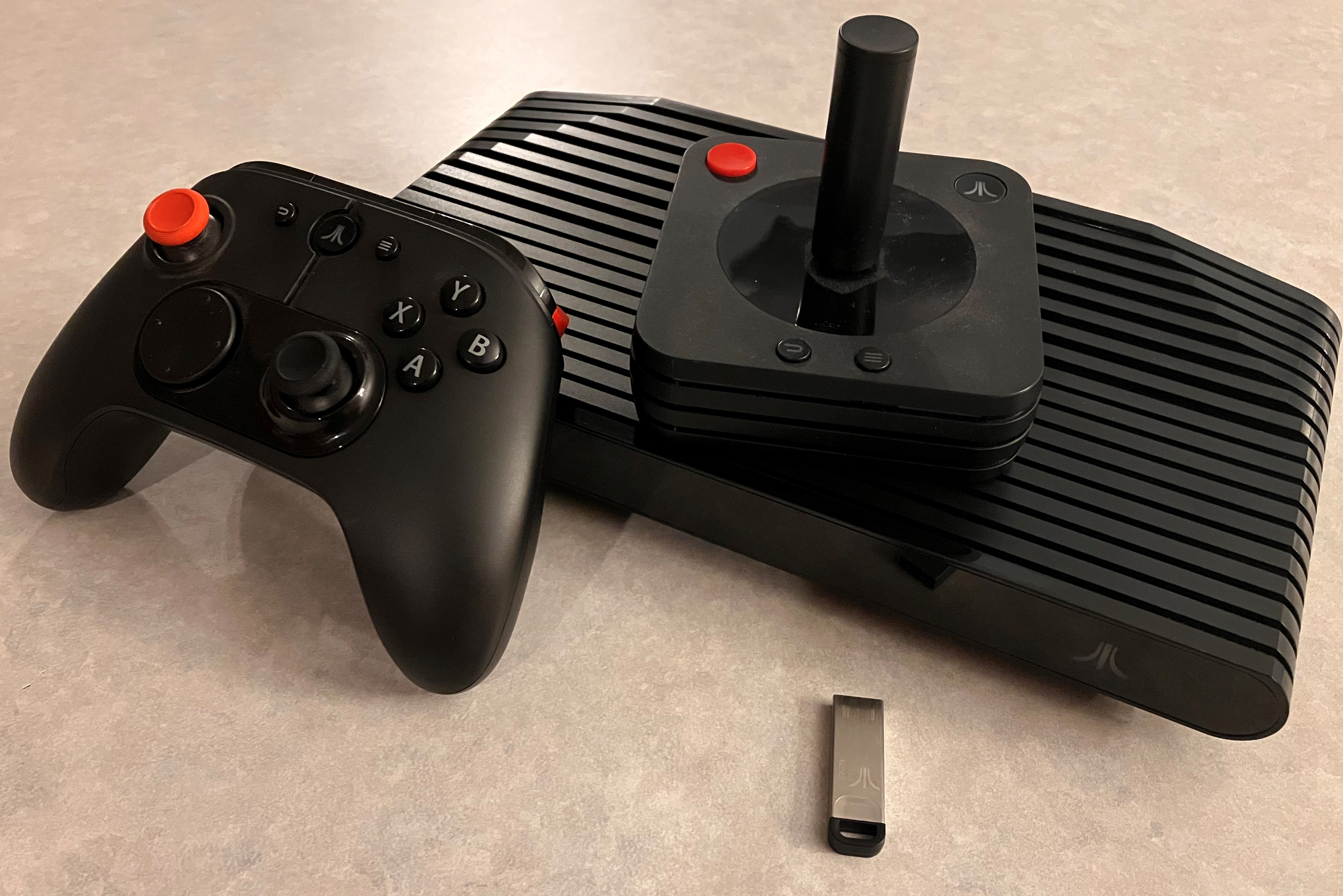
- Atari VCS 800 Onyx, controllers, and PC USB
- Also known as: Project Ataribox
- Developer: Atari, Inc.
- Manufacturer: Flex (console); PowerA (controllers)
- Type: Home video game console
- Generation: Ninth
- Released: Backers: December 14, 2020; AUS/NZ: June 10, 2021; NA: June 15, 2021
- Lifespan: 2020–2025
- Introductory price: US$139.99(Onyx Base system); US$199.99 (All-In system)
- Discontinued: 2025
- Units sold: 10,000+ as of Q4 2020
- Operating system: Debian-based (Atari OS)
- CPU: 14 nm AMD R1606G Zen processor with 2 cores and 4 threads @ 2.6 GHz (up to 3.5 GHz)
- Memory: 8 GB DDR4 (800 model) (upgradeable); 4 GB DDR4 (400 model) (upgradeable)
- Storage: Internal flash memory: 32 GB
- Removable storage: Internal (user upgradeable) M.2 SSD, or external USB-based storage
- Display: HDMI 2.0
- Graphics: Radeon Vega 3 APU architecture with up to 4GB shared graphics memory
- Controller input: Classic joystick, modern controller
- Connectivity: 2.4/5 GHz 802.11ac Wi-Fi; Gigabit Ethernet; Bluetooth 5.0; 4 × USB 3.1
- Online services: Atari VCS Store
- Dimensions: 11.6 in × 5.9 in × 1.9 in (29.5 cm × 15.0 cm × 4.8 cm)
- Weight: 3 lb (1.4 kg)
- Successor: Atari 2600+
- Website: www.atari.com/pages/atari-vcs

The Atari VCS is a home video game console produced by affiliates of Atari, Inc. It plays contemporary games and streaming entertainment via AtariOS, a Linux-based operating system that allows users to install other compatible games, including those compatible with Microsoft Windows. Its exterior encasing design is intended to pay homage to the original Atari's 1977 Atari 2600 and is named after the acronym of that console's original name, Video Computer System (VCS). It sold poorly and was discontinued in 2025. The digital storefront is planned for termination on February 1, 2027.

The system was first revealed as Ataribox in June 2017 and partially crowdfunded starting in May 2018. After several delays, the console was expected to ship in March 2020, but was delayed again due to the COVID-19 pandemic. Initial units for backers were shipped in December 2020, while the console had a general release in June 2021, in Australia, New Zealand and then in North America; shipping was initially restricted to the United States only by Atari and official distributors before it was expanded to include Canada by October 2021. The VCS has not been released in European, African or Asian territories. In March 2023, Atari announced it was releasing 100 numbered-edition consoles that were held in reserve.

== History ==
Atari Corporation left the hardware business around 1996, soon after it released the Atari Jaguar video game console, and was liquidated in 1998, with Hasbro Interactive purchasing the intellectual property of the brand. In 2001, Infogrames Entertainment SA purchased Hasbro Interactive. Infogrames later renamed itself Atari SA, while the Hasbro Interactive subsidiary was renamed Atari Interactive. Atari Interactive provided licensing for the various Atari Flashback dedicated consoles produced since 2004.

The concept of the Atari VCS came from Feargal Mac Conuladh, who joined Atari and became general manager to oversee the Ataribox release. Conuladh said that he was inspired to create the unit after seeing players connect laptops to televisions to use a larger screen to play games that were not available for consoles, and then use social media platforms outside of the games via the same laptop to communicate with friends. He also saw that Atari's game catalog had a good amount of brand recognition. His design goal was to feed nostalgia for the old Atari consoles and allow players to enjoy indie games without a personal computer. Processor maker AMD provided custom componentry for it. While Atari made most of the decisions on the unit's hardware, they have also kept open to suggestions from Atari fans on the unit's aesthetics and other visual features.

The console in its current rendition functions as a sort of hybrid between a home video game console and a gaming PC, two branches of electronics Atari has operated in previously. Conuladh took lessons learned from the commercial failure of the Ouya, a similar crowd-funded microconsole. One was to use the Linux operating system directly, rather than through the limited version offered through Android, as to be able to provide more capabilities and a more open system to developers and users. Conuladh did not want to restrict what users could install on the device; while the unit's operating system was to have a storefront feature, he wanted users to be able to add software by any means possible. He also decided to use a higher-performance laptop/desktop APU than the smartphone/tablet APU used in the Ouya. Conuladh also wanted to steer away from problems encountered by Valve's Steam Machines, which provided a minimum set of specifications for hardware that Valve expected other vendors to build towards, but ultimately never took off. Instead, the Atari VCS hardware configuration was to remain fixed and controlled by Atari. Additionally, Atari expected to contract for the manufacture of all the consoles themselves, rather than relying on third parties to manufacture their own systems based on the Ataribox specifications.

In December 2017, just prior to opening for pre-orders for the VCS (at the time known as Ataribox), Atari recognized there were still several issues they needed to address with the hardware, and decided to postpone the pre-orders. At that point, Michael Arzt, the head for Atari Connected Devices, took over production while Conuladh left Atari, though the two had been coordinating its development previously. According to Atari CEO Fred Chesnais, this period gave them time to review what they wanted the Ataribox to do, and revise the unit's specifications and hardware without sacrificing the core elements of being a Linux-based system that would be able to run classic Atari games along with newer titles.

=== Announcements ===
Atari first teased Project Ataribox in June 2017 during E3, releasing images of the box but did not call out any technical specifications. As this followed Nintendo's November 2016 release of the NES Classic Edition, a dedicated console that supported a number of pre-loaded Nintendo Entertainment System games, journalists believed that the new Atari system was developed in kind, to provide a way to play classic Atari games on a dedicated platform.

Further information released in September 2017 provided more technical specifications, details on the software approach including the plans to use Linux and provide an open platform for other compatible software to be installed, and a planned release in the second quarter of 2019. The price is expected to fall between $249 and $299, based on configuration options. The announcement also stated some of the funding for the unit will come from a planned Indiegogo crowdfunding campaign to be launched before the end of 2017. Conuladh said they chose Indiegogo to help with international sales and hardware support, including a close relationship with Arrow Electronics, an electronics components company, that has supported past Indiegogo projects.

Pre-orders for the system were expected to start on December 14, 2017, but Atari announced a temporary delay that day, stating "it is taking more time to create the platform and ecosystem the Atari community deserves".

During the 2018 Game Developers Conference, Atari announced that the unit would be called the Atari VCS. Pre-orders for the console and controllers started on May 30, 2018, exclusively via Indiegogo, with shipping expected in quarter 2 of 2019; the configurations included the wood-veneer front panel "Collector's Edition" model, and an all-black with red-orange highlights "Onyx" console model. A base system, consisting of a console and joystick controller, ran from $279 to $299. Within the first day, the Atari VCS saw more than US$2.25 million in pre-orders, far exceeding the anticipated US$100 thousand they were seeking to start production.

On June 27, 2018, Rob Wyatt, system architect for the original Xbox and designer of PlayStation 3's graphic systems, was announced as part of the VCS team. Wyatt and his company, Tin Giant, had been working with Atari for months to define hardware and operating system requirements. About joining the project, Wyatt said: "Who wouldn't want to be part of bringing Atari back? From the moment the AMD team introduced me to Atari and the VCS project, I have been intrigued and inspired by the opportunity that it represents." The announcement came only days after British technology news website The Register and Atari faced off after an interview between a reporter and Atari COO Michael Arzt from March 2018 resurfaced. In the article, The Register reporter questioned the VCS project's legitimacy after Arzt was unable to answer certain questions about the project.

In March 2019, Atari announced that they would be delaying the launch of the VCS to the end of 2019 and announced that the system has upgraded to an unannounced embedded 14 nm AMD Ryzen processor with Radeon Vega-based graphics and two Zen CPU cores. The new AMD processor supports native 4K video playback with modern HDCP, has built-in Ethernet and a secure framebuffer.

In July 2019, Atari announced that they would be providing more information about the product's mass production and game content to be available for the system in summer 2019. By the end of summer 2019, no functional version of the AtariVCS meeting the product description has been shown publicly, and additional details of gaming content have not been forthcoming.

On October 4, 2019, Wyatt stated that he resigned from the project in a statement to The Register. Wyatt cited non-payment by Atari as a key reason for his departure. In wake of this news, several of those that had backed the Indiegogo campaign took to the project's Reddit forum to ask about the state of the project, but Atari subsequently took down these posts. In April 2020, Wyatt filed a lawsuit against Atari to recover payment for his design work.

Atari VCS's COO Michael Arzt stated in December 2019 that they were in the final stages of pre-production of the unit, with plans to ship the console to those that pre-ordered by March 2020 before the units were then sent to retail. Arzt explained that the lack of communications over the previous year was due to limitations with their partnership contracts, but promised that they would try to provide more regular updates moving forward.

The console was delayed again in March 2020, due to the COVID-19 pandemic. Atari showed off a new production update on March 20, when they said that they have received enough parts to build the first 500 Atari VCS production units. However, most of these units were earmarked as dev kits for developers.

=== Release ===
On May 29, 2020, Atari announced the first batch of 500 production units are ready to exit the factory by mid-June, and expected all 10,000 VCS units would be delivered to backers by the end of 2020.

The console was released and shipped to backers between December 14, 2020, and December 16, 2020. while the retail release date was still unknown to this date. It was released about a month after the release of the PlayStation 5 and the Xbox Series X and Series S consoles, with early backer reviews finding the performances to be inferior to those consoles. On December 22, 2020, Atari announced the success of a fund raising effort to Atari VCS run-rate production rhythm, then planned for the first quarter of 2021.

The console was released worldwide on June 15, 2021. It was released as two bundles, an Onyx Base bundle that includes the console. An All-In bundle includes the console and two controllers: a Classic Joystick modelled after the CX40 joystick, and a Modern Controller that resembles more current controllers. The system sold poorly; Atari lost 92% of its revenue in hardware sales between 2021 and 2022, 27% of its overall revenue. Atari CEO Wade Rosen, who took over the role in 2021, said that "it’s probably not what we would design or put out today" and that he inherited the project from previous management.

Atari stopped selling the VCS itself in 2025. In an announcement made on the Atari Club Discord server on October 21, 2026, Atari announced they were pulling software support for the system and shutting down the VCS store on February 1st, 2027. An OS Update that "allows users to migrate all functionality to their local machine" without "any dependencies on Atari infrastructure for authentication and software" was also announced.

== Hardware ==
The Atari VCS was announced in 2017 and is based on a customized AMD central processor using Radeon graphic processing technology. Pictures of the unit released in July 2017 showed HDMI and USB ports, an Ethernet port, and an SD card slot. The unit's photos echo the look-and-feel of the Atari 2600, with a black veneer and faux wood-grain front plate, though sized about half as large.

Conuladh said that they anticipate the hardware is comparable to a mid-range personal computer for 2017, powerful enough to run most games but not for more recent AAA titles. This was before the platform was redesigned around AMD's new Ryzen R1000 chip, the R1606G announced in 2019. Since then, the VCS has been demonstrated at the 2020 CES playing Fortnite and Borderlands 2.

The hardware includes a "Classic Joystick" controller and a "Modern Controller". The "Classic Joystick" is based on the single-button design of the Atari CX40 joystick, adding only additional inset buttons for accessing the console's menus, as well as LED lighting. The "Modern Controller" features a layout typical of modern console platforms. The controllers are designed in partnership with PowerA.

The Atari VCS collector's edition was available only to Indiegogo backers, and is a numbered edition with a real wood Teak front panel. Three other editions are available online to the general public: ONYX (with a shiny black faceplate and red backplate), Black Walnut (also a real wood front panel) and Carbon Gold (with a shiny black faceplate accented with gold stripes). Carbon Gold is available exclusively through Walmart.

The Atari VCS features a Ryzen-based AMD R1606G APU with two cores and four threads (SMT) that clocks at 2.6 GHz up to 3.5 GHz and a Vega 3 graphic solution (GCN 5) supporting OpenGL 4.6, Vulkan, with an HDMI 2.0 connection supporting 4K screens at 60 Hz with HDCP 2.2 protection. The APU's performance is equivalent to an Athlon 200GE. The VCS 800 features 8 GB of DDR4 2400 (4 GB for the VCS 400 model) upgradeable to 32 GB, and an internal eMMC storage of 32 GB with an available M.2 SSD SATA slot to increase the internal storage. Four USB 3.1 ports are provided, enabling external storage and support for accessories. The Atari VCS features one Gigabit Ethernet connection, WiFi and BlueTooth.

The Atari VCS is a PC/console hybrid, and its performance can be compared to a "Linux gaming PC".

== Software ==
The Atari VCS is driven by a Linux operating system. In 2017, quoting a mail from the company it was said the software is specifically designed to be open to allow to install other Linux-compatible applications on the Atari VCS alongside pre-installed games, using Atari Vault (now called Atari VCS Vault). Other applications that can be installed include streaming applications, music players, and web browsers.

Whereas the Atari 2600 was a cartridge-driven game system, the VCS does not use cartridges or optical discs for games, but instead allows players to download games from a built-in store. The Atari VCS will have a custom storefront that Atari developed with an undisclosed "leading industry partner", where users can download additional video games and applications. All users will have access to basic online features such as the store and online multiplayer; however, access to cloud storage and live streaming video games will be available exclusively on a subscription service.

Atari has stated that the unit will ship with "tons of classic Atari retro games pre-loaded, and current titles from a range of studios". Conuladh stated that there will be "hundreds" of Atari games, plus a number of other retro games from other catalogs. The console will ship with Antstream Arcade, a game streaming service that supports titles from the Amiga, Commodore 64, ZX Spectrum and arcade games.

Atari announced that the Google Chrome web browser will be pre-installed and will power some of the console's online services. On August 13, 2021, Atari added support for Xbox Cloud Gaming, Nvidia GeForce Now, Amazon Luna, and Google Stadia through the built-in chrome browser, with each service presented as a separate app.

=== Accessories ===
The Atari VCS is available bundled with the Classic Joystick and Modern Controller ("all in"). There is also the option to purchase the device without them. This comes as Atari allows users to use their own pre-existing accessories including remotes, mouse and keyboards, microphones, external speakers and other controllers. The Atari VCS is compatible with most PC peripherals via both Bluetooth and USB 3.0.

In November 2022, Atari released the PC Mode USB. This provides a simple "plug-and-play" way to the operate the Atari VCS as a Linux PC. It is an Atari-branded 128 GB USB 3.2 drive that comes preloaded with a custom Debian operating system, additional storage and the LibreOffice Suite.

On July 5, 2023, Atari announced that Playmaji's Polymega Remix add-on and Polymega App would be supported by the Atari VCS, as part of a "strategic collaboration" with the company. This follows Atari's minority investment into Playmaji, which occurred around the same time.

=== Backward compatibility ===
The Atari VCS is not compatible with physical games from legacy Atari consoles because there are no cartridge readers on the system. Atari announced on October 15, 2021, under their new series called 'Flashback Fridays' that emulated versions of selected Atari 7800 games will become available for purchase via Atari VCS Store for $3 each. The first two Atari 7800 titles to be announced were Basketbrawl 7800 and Desert Falcon 7800. As of January 24, 2022, 14 Atari 7800 games are available on the Atari VCS.

== Reception ==
=== Pre-release ===
Early backers reviews were mixed. GameRevolution praised the console's "thankfully" small size, but also stated that its design "still remains subdued enough to match the style of modern consoles". It also found that the Classic Controller "lacks in utility", due to the lack of modern games that can be played with it. Video Games Chronicle criticized the console's architecture, saying that it does not give Microsoft or Sony "anything to worry about". Due to the strong competition and Atari's conflicted history, CNET concluded that the console has an "identity crisis". Although with this criticism, Tom's Guide stated that Atari VCS "may be not as good as a next-gen console, but buying one is lot easier than working out where to buy a PS5."

=== Post-launch ===
IGN awarded the system a 5/10, saying: "The Atari VCS tries to do some interesting things but ultimately fails as a console and a PC alternative." CGMagazine gave the console a generally favorable review, especially to retro lovers, but outlined that "its price point is just a bit too high to recommend."

=== Sales ===
Exact sales figures for the VCS are unknown, but according to Atari's financial reports, sales related to hardware fell from $2.44 million in 2021 to around $212,000 in 2022. Due to the "underperformance by the VCS", the company suspended the relationship with the original manufacturing partner in December 2022. Atari said it "remains committed to the VCS platform" and has been adding more support for developers and continues to add more games to the store. Atari also stated "there are several hardware projects under development that will expand the VCS ecosystem and create additional utility for users."

== See also ==
- Atari Flashback
- Atari 2600+
