= Big Air Freestyle =

2002 video game

- North American cover art
- Developer: Paradigm Entertainment
- Publisher: Infogrames
- Producers: Chris Johnson; Steve Stringer
- Designer: Mahdad Ansari
- Composer: Bob Daspit
- Platform: GameCube
- Release: NA: September 13, 2002; EU: November 8, 2002; AU: November 15, 2002
- Genre: Racing
- Modes: Single-player, multiplayer

Big Air Freestyle is a motorcycle racing video game for the GameCube developed by Paradigm Entertainment and published by Infogrames in 2002. It is an enhanced port of the PlayStation 2 game MX Rider, without the FIA license.

== Reception ==
Reception

Aggregate score
Aggregator	Score
Metacritic	56 / 100

Review scores
Publication	Score
4Players	67%
Electronic Gaming Monthly	4 / 10
Game Informer	6 / 10
Gamekult	6 / 10
GameSpot	4.3 / 10
GameSpy	2.5/5
IGN	6.4 / 10
Jeuxvideo.com	9 / 20
NGC Magazine	28%
Nintendo Power	3.3 / 5
X-Play	3/5

The game received "mixed" reviews according to the review aggregation website Metacritic. It was a runner-up for the "Worst Game on GameCube" award at GameSpot's Best and Worst of 2002 Awards, which went to Jeremy McGrath Supercross World.
