= The Terminator: Dawn of Fate =

2002 video game

- PlayStation 2 cover art
- Developer: Paradigm Entertainment
- Publisher: Infogrames (Note: Released under the Atari brand name)
- Designer: Craig Bolin
- Composer: Bob Daspit
- Series: Terminator
- Platforms: PlayStation 2, Xbox
- Release: NA: September 17, 2002; EU: October 25, 2002; AU: October 2002 (PS2); AU: November 2002 (Xbox)
- Genre: Action
- Mode: Single-player

The Terminator: Dawn of Fate is a 2002 action video game developed by Paradigm Entertainment and published by Infogrames for the PlayStation 2 and Xbox. It is based on the Terminator film series, serving as a prequel to the first two films.

The Terminator: Dawn of Fate received "mixed or average reviews" according to Metacritic. It was largely criticized for its preset camera angles and voice acting, although the music and sound effects were praised.

== Gameplay ==
The Terminator: Dawn of Fate is a prequel to the first two films. It is set in the future during a post-apocalyptic war between humans and machines. John Connor leads the human resistance against the Terminator machines, which are led by Skynet. The game features three playable members of the resistance: Kyle Reese, Catherine Luna, and Justin Perry. The game ends with Kyle Reese being sent back in time to prevent a Terminator from killing John's mother, Sarah Connor, before he is born. The ending precedes the events depicted in the 1984 film The Terminator.

The Terminator: Dawn of Fate is a third-person shooter game. The camera angles are preset to fixed positions, and they change with each new area that the player enters. The player can also enter a first-person perspective for easier aiming, but cannot move while in this mode. The game features 10 levels, each one tasking the player with various mission objectives. The player can use a variety of weapons, including pistols, assault rifles, rocket launchers, canister bombs, C4 explosives, and a plasma baton. Gun turrets are also located throughout the game. The player can also engage in hand-to-hand combat, and an adrenaline boost can be activated for increased effectiveness of such attacks.

== Development and release ==
The game was announced in January 2002, and was already six or seven months into development. Infogrames devised the idea for a Terminator prequel game approximately one year prior to the game's announcement. The future war setting was featured briefly in scenes from the first two films.

The game supports various sound modes, including Dolby Pro Logic II. In March 2002, two songs were recorded for the game by industrial metal band Fear Factory. This would be the band's final work before temporarily breaking up that same month. Songs include "Full Metal Contact," "Terminate," and "Hi-Tech Hate" from the albums Obsolete and "Digimortal".

The game was originally scheduled for release in May 2002, although it was delayed to allow for more fine-tuning. Respectively, the PS2 and Xbox versions were later expected for release in June and August 2002. In the United States, the game was ultimately released in September 2002.

== Reception ==
Reception

Aggregate score
Aggregator	Score
Metacritic	(PS2) 58/100 (Xbox) 53/100

Review scores
Publication	Score
Computer and Video Games	(PS2) 4/10
Electronic Gaming Monthly	4.83/10
Game Informer	6/10
GamePro	(PS2) 3/5 (Xbox) 2/5
GameSpot	(Xbox) 6.6/10 (PS2) 6.1/10
GameSpy	2.5/5
GameZone	(Xbox) 6.7/10 (PS2) 6.1/10
IGN	(PS2) 5.6/10 (Xbox) 5.3/10
Official U.S. PlayStation Magazine	2.5/5
Entertainment Weekly	C−
Maxim	4/5

The Terminator: Dawn of Fate received "mixed or average reviews" according to Metacritic. Some critics believed that the game made a poor use of the Terminator license, while others believed the game would have appeal for Terminator fans. GamePro wrote, "Between the killer license and a story line that leads right up to the first film, it was hard not to have high hopes for The Terminator: Dawn of Fate, but unfortunately, this game pummels those expectations into rubble." Andrew Reiner of Game Informer stated that the game "wallows in mediocrity," calling it "another highly respected, licensed product that had the potential to thrive in the gaming world, but didn't receive the development treatment that it truly deserved." Sam Kennedy of Official U.S. PlayStation Magazine wrote that the game "gets gradually better as you go, and it turns out to be a somewhat solid adventure." Tom Ham of GameSpy opined that the game felt rushed. Reviewers for Game Informer gave differing opinions on the quality of the game's storyline. Ryan MacDonald of GameSpot opined that the story "isn't especially compelling even for die-hard Terminator fans". Some critics believed that the game adequately captured the atmosphere of the Terminator films.

The gameplay received criticism from some reviewers who considered it repetitive. Nick Valentino of GameZone complained of "seemingly never-ending Terminator hordes." The artificial intelligence also received criticism. The changing camera angles were largely criticized, with some reviewers stating that it caused in-game disorientation. The targeting system received some criticism as well. Kristian Brogger of Game Informer stated that because of the changing camera perspectives, "Many times you'll find yourself firing at something you can't see, but which your targeting system has locked on to." Kennedy stated that the camera angles "almost always lead to confusion—not to mention lots of walking into walls—and the targeting system is so haphazard that you never quite feel comfortable." The controls were also criticized. Ham stated, "Just when you think you're walking in one direction, the camera switches angles and you have to switch the way you were holding the analog stick because now you're facing an alternate direction. In a combat situation, this can prove fatal."

Some reviewers praised the graphics, while others considered them to be average. GamePro, in its review of the PS2 version, wrote that the graphics have "moments of brilliance with cinematic FMVs and well-rendered environments; however, sometimes the animation is a bit clumsy as figures seem to just glide across the screen." Valentino, also reviewing the PS2 version, gave a mixed opinion of the graphics: "Characters, for instance, aren't rendered as well as the wonderful environments. Yet in the cut scenes, the graphics improve greatly. The background details are plentiful". IGN complained that Kyle Reese "looks like his head is about to burst. Understandable that they couldn't get the rights to the likeness, but does that mean he can't even look human?" Some praise went to the lighting effects. Critics considered the graphics of the Xbox version to be somewhat superior to the PS2 version. MacDonald believed that the Xbox version had better lighting effects, and Ham believed it had a better framerate. GameZone's Eduardo Zacarias believed that the Xbox version could have had better graphics, while stating that it was better-looking than its PS2 counterpart.

The sound effects and music were praised, although criticism went to the voice acting, which some critics perceived as over-dramatic. However, GamePro considered the voice acting decent, while Brogger disliked the sound. Ham was critical of the "cheesy guitar music". IGN considered the voice acting average.
