= Mr. Run and Jump =

2023 video game

- Developers: Graphite Lab; Heavy Horse Games
- Publisher: Atari
- Platforms: Linux; macOS; Atari VCS; Atari 2600; Nintendo Switch; PlayStation 4; PlayStation 5; Windows; Xbox One; Xbox Series X/S
- Release: WW: July 25, 2023
- Genre: Platform
- Mode: Single-player

Mr. Run and Jump is a side-scrolling platform game developed by Graphite Lab and Heavy Horse Games and published by Atari in 2023.

== Gameplay ==
Mr. Run and Jump gameplay

Mr. Run and Jump requires players to progress through a horizontally scrolling world. There are 20 levels, which introduce progressively more difficult enemies and hazards, which must be avoided. If the player is hit, they respawn at an earlier point. If the player dies multiple times in the same area, an optional power-up appears in the world. Players have access to all the special moves from the beginning of the game, but they are not formally introduced until it is necessary to use them.

The Atari 2600 version of the game contains seven different levels of different colors: blue, green, yellow, purple, red, white, black (with invisible platforms), each consisting of a set of single-screen left-to-right maps with a ladder leading to the next level. The controls are simplified due to hardware restrictions, the only actions available are moving with the joystick, and jumping using the joystick button. Checkpoints are placed only on the start of each level, making this version much more difficult to complete. The score is always shown on the bottom part of the screen, counting down every second from 25000. After completing the last level, the game shows an ending screen, with the final score.

== Development and release ==
Mr. Run and Jump began as an Atari 2600 homebrew game developed as a side project by John Mikula, a programmer at St. Louis, Missouri-based studio Graphite Lab. This version is briefly seen in the modern version, and an Atari 2600 cartridge can be pre-ordered. The modern version is a sequel of sorts. The name came from an attempt to find a unique title involving running and jumping, but players can choose a male, female, or nongendered character. Atari released it for Windows, PlayStation 4, PlayStation 5, Xbox One and Xbox Series X/S, and Nintendo Switch on July 25, 2023. In January 2024, Atari announced that the game would be released physically for the PlayStation 4, PlayStation 5, and Nintendo Switch in Europe in February as part of a double-pack with fellow Graphite Lab title Kombinera, under an expanded distribution agreement with British publisher Numskull Games.

== Reception ==
On Metacritic, Mr. Run and Jump received positive reviews on personal computers, PlayStation 5, and the Nintendo Switch. Despite finding its difficulty frustrating, Game Informer said that solving the puzzles had them "shouting in triumph". Gamezebo felt Mr. Run and Jump is too hard and criticized the power-ups offered on death as "a cheap cop out". They said speedrunners may enjoy it, but they recommended others play more balanced games. TouchArcade called it "very well made" and recommended it to players who can enjoy a cruelly difficult game. Shacknews called it "a fun, but frustrating game", but they criticized the controls, which they said made some levels feel like a chore.
