= TAC-2 =

80s Joy-Stick Controller

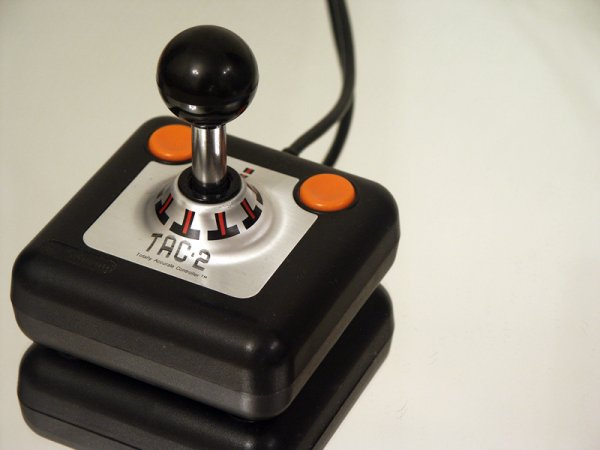
TAC-2 joystick

The Totally Accurate Controller MK2 (TAC-2) is an Atari 2600-compatible digital joystick game controller. It was commonly used with 1980s microcomputers such as the TI-99/4A, Atari 8-bit computers, Atari ST, Commodore 64 and Amiga. It was manufactured by Suncom in Illinois.

== US-made model ==
The joystick's square base came in two colours, black or creamy white.

It had a list price of $19.95 when it was introduced.

=== Features ===
- Large arcade-style ball top handle
- One 8-way stick (4 digital switches) with short throw
- Two fire buttons (wired in parallel as button 1; indistinguishable in software)

=== Construction ===
- The joystick has no microswitches. Instead, it uses a metal ball that short-circuits contacts around the bottom shaft of the controller.
- The handle has a customized tyre valve (TR-418) of rubber for self-centering. The handle is covered with a chrome sleeve.
- The fire button switches are brass contact plates which tend to become corroded and thus need care every now and then.

== China-made model ==
A cost reduced version was released, in which the tyre valve was replaced with a white rubber gasket that held a black plastic tube. The metal ball was only plugged into it (not screwed in as the original version), and the brass plates in the buttons were replaced with the wire of the redesigned button return spring.

It is only known in black and can be recognized by its shiny plastic stick instead of the chrome valve sleeve, and deeper red buttons instead of the original orange.

== 2026 remake ==
In August 2026, the newly formed Commodore International Corporation announced a remake of the joystick in five different colors, with the original trademark.

The new joysticks are supposed to be faithful to the original except that the three new colors variations: beige, "Starlight" (transparent) and "Founder's Edition" (gold, transparent) have buttons that light up.
