= Haunted House (video game) =

1982 video game

- Box art by Steve Hendricks
- Developer: Atari, Inc.
- Publishers: Atari, Inc.
- Programmer: James Andreasen
- Platform: Atari 2600
- Release: February 1982
- Genre: Adventure
- Mode: Single player

Haunted House is a 1982 adventure game developed and published by Atari, Inc. for the Atari 2600. The player controls a character presented by a pair of eyes peering in the dark as they explore a mansion seeking out parts of an urn to return to the entrance. The game world is populated by roaming enemies including vampire bats, tarantulas, and a ghost. Haunted House was among the first games to use player-controlled scrolling between large portions of the visual space.

Haunted House received positive reviews from contemporary video game publications such as The Space Gamer and Electronic Games, while others, such as How to Win at Home Video Games, noted the game's difficulty and lack of intuitiveness. The game has seen several releases across consoles and formats as part of Atari compilation packages as well as follow-up games, such as Haunted House (2010) and Haunted House: Cryptic Graves (2014), and Haunted House (2023).

Critics such as Christopher Buecheler of GameSpy have called Haunted House one of the earliest examples of the survival horror genre due to its elements of horror themes, limited item management, and a variety of monsters. Other studies of the genre have suggested that the game lacked the specific elements that later games such as Alone in the Dark (1992) and Resident Evil (1996) had to establish it as a unique game genre.

== Gameplay ==
Haunted House is a single-player adventure game in which the player's goal is to recover three pieces of a magic urn that are randomly placed throughout 24 rooms of a mansion and return them to the entrance. The items and some areas within the game are revealed to player via matches which the player can ignite and blow out. The magazine How to Win at Video Games described Haunted House as a "storyline" game, comparing its gameplay as being similar to that of Atari's previous games Superman (1979) and Adventure (1980). Tim Onosko of The Capital Times also compared Haunted House to the two previous games, describing it as an adventure game that requires players to learn rules and requirements and gathering items to reach a goal as they play.

The player has nine lives to attempt this task. The player can only collect one object at a time, and can swap between two objects by touching another one. The mansion is a set of 24 rooms between four floors. The player can traverse through different doors that ascend or descend a level, but none permit the player to go in both directions. Throughout the mansion, the player may encounter such enemies as vampire bats, tarantulas and a ghost, which cause the player to lose a life upon contact.

The game has nine settings of varying difficulty. For example, setting 1 has a room where walls around the room are lit by matches while all others are completely dark. Further challenges introduce locked doors, which require a master key that is also hidden within the mansion. Other difficulties add extra enemies and enemy abilities such as the bats stealing a carried item and placing it at a random location around the mansion. A scepter can be found inside the mansion as a collectable item, which prevent enemies from chasing the player on most levels of difficulty. The ghost will still give chase on higher difficulty levels regardless of whether the player has the scepter or not.

== Development ==
The player is represented by the pair of eyes in the house. Haunted House was among the first video games to use player-controlled scrolling.

Haunted House was developed by Atari. It was programmed by James Andreasen, a graduate of the University of Colorado in Boulder who worked as a software engineer at MSI and Atari. Working titles for the game included Mystery Mansion and Graves Manor.

The game was developed for the company's Atari 2600 video game system, then named the Atari Video Computer System. For sound and graphics, the Atari 2600 had its Television Interface Adaptor (TIA) which authors Nick Montfort and Ian Bogost described as a programming challenge, allowing for only a relatively small number of unique features. The Atari 2600 did not allow for such services such as graphic rendering, forcing programmers to draw the entirety of each frame of the game's display. Like other games such as Raiders of the Lost Ark (1982), the environments in Haunted House are hard-designed and loaded into the game, and are small compared to the other games such as Pitfall! (1982) where the worlds are consistently generated by code. Haunted House was among the first video games to use player-controlled scrolling between large portions of the visual space. To save further memory for the randomly placed items in the game, the locations of the urn pieces are generated through polynomial counters, creating numbers that are counted in unusual orders.

Sound effects were common in Atari 2600 games, though the frequencies that the TIA could generate would miss most parts of the chromatic scale. Due to the limited sound, programmers at Atari would often have the system make percussion sounds, which were applied by Andreasen to create the foot step sound effects of ascent and descent in the stairway in the game among other sounds.

== Release ==
Steven Hendricks's original art for the cover of Haunted House. The image was rejected by a member of Atari's marketing department due to the location of the glaring eyes.

Haunted House was released in February 1982. The artist for the cover art and manual was Steve Hendricks. Hendricks stated that the art used within the game's manual was initially going to be the game's cover art. After receiving approval for the design, he was told by a member of Atari's marketing department that the art was going to be rejected due to the location of eyes over the chest of the person.

Haunted House was re-released in various compilation formats, such as the Atari 80 in One for Windows in 2003 and the Atari Anthology for PlayStation 2 and Xbox in 2004. It was also released on portable devices as part of the Atari Greatest Hits release for the Nintendo DS and iOS. Haunted House was included as part of the Atari 50 (2022) compilation and as a compilation of ten games included with Atari 2600+ on the 10 Games in 1 game cartridge released on November 17, 2023.

== Reception ==
Cashbox reported the game as one of the top selling video games by July 1982. Reviews commented on the game's similarity to other titles, graphics and sound, and its difficulty. Arnie Katz and Bill Kunkel of Electronic Games found the game similar to Atari's previous game Adventure (1980). The reviewers commented that it was "much more atmospheric" than Adventure, and found it to be "one of the most intriguing and novel video game cartridges to appear in some time" calling its audio and visuals excellent, while finding the scoring system a bit difficult to parse. Another review from Electronic Games, from the "1983 Software Encyclopedia" issue, gave the game a seven out of ten rating, again finding the audio and visuals as excellent while stating that the game gave the player "the spine-tingling sensation that something spooky is always about to happen". Richard A. Edwards of The Space Gamer declared that the game was among the best graphics and sound Atari had produced and could not find any drawbacks to the game.

Onosoko of The Capital Times wrote that the game's graphics were deemed as "blocky" and unimpressive, but the game itself could be challenging. A review in Video Games found that it was hard to get excited by a game predominantly played in darkness, giving it an "interest rating" of five out of ten and a "skill rating" of nine out of ten, stating that "you almost need to take notes to keep track of things in this game [...] there is no single solution to any of the [difficulty levels]". How to Win at Video Games found the game difficult and not easy to understand at first, but recommended it to audiences willing to give time to learn the game's mechanics.

Retrospective review scores

Review score
Publication	Score
Game Informer	7.75/10

In 1995, Flux magazine ranked Haunted House #68 on their list of "Top 100 Video Games". Christopher Buecheler of GameSpy included Haunted House into the website's "Hall of Fame" in December 2002. Beucheler praised the game, stating that "in an age where most game design was "fire lasers until you die"", that the game was a noteworthy accomplishment. Brett Weiss included the game as an "honorable mention" in his book The 100 Greatest Console Video Games 1977-1987 (2014), recommending it for Adventure fans who were "hankering for something creepier". A retrospective review in Game Informer from 2005 said that Haunted House contained many gameplay elements that were found in later survival horror games in the Silent Hill or Resident Evil series despite lacking the "visual razzle-dazzle" of those games.

== Legacy ==
Some video game critics, such as Buecheler of GameSpy and Skyler Miller of AllGame, have cited the game as being one of the earliest in the survival horror genre. Buecheler specifically noted the elements of the genre with its creepy themes, limited item management, and a variety of monsters. In her writings on the genre, Laurie N. Taylor traced the origins of the genre to Alone in the Dark (1992) and that the genre was expanded on by Resident Evil (1996) while stating that survival horror was "Like most genre definitions [...] a loose category and one unevenly applied by players, journalists, designers and scholars". Matthew Wiese in 2009 similarly said that labeling all horror-themed games as survival horror was problematic due to the term not existing prior to the release of Resident Evil (1996). In Horror Games Magazine (2003), Vim Sical and Remi Delekta found that horror required mise-en-scène, which required visual technical capabilities. Bernard Perron, in his book The World of Scary Video Games, agreed with this statement, stating that Haunted House could not have in mind the mise-en-scène of fear that would become possible in later decades and chose to regard games like Haunted House for "what they were".

Several follow-ups to Haunted House have been published. Atari released a new version of Haunted House for the PC, Xbox 360 (via Xbox Live Arcade) and the Nintendo Wii in 2010. Roland Lesterlin, the producer of the 2010 game, said that they made connections with the original game such as the pair of glowing eyes representing the player. Atari published another version of Haunted House, Haunted House: Cryptic Graves, by Italian studio Dreampainters for Windows on November 24, 2014. The game moved away from the more cartoonish look of the previous 2010 release. Digital Eclipse made a new game titled Haunted Houses featuring 3D voxel-based graphics which was included in the Atari 50 (2022) compilation release. Orbit Studio released a new version of Haunted House that was a roguelite-styled game on October 12, 2023.
