= Paradigm Entertainment =

American video game development company

Paradigm Entertainment Inc.
- Type: Subsidiary
- Industry: Video games
- Predecessor: Paradigm Simulation
- Founded: 1996; 30 years ago Addison, Texas, U.S.
- Defunct: November 5, 2008
- Fate: Dissolved
- Headquarters: Farmers Branch, Texas, U.S.
- Key people: Dave Gatchel (general manager)
- Products: See game titles
- Number of employees: 57 (as of November 2008)
- Parent: Paradigm Simulation (1996—1997); Infogrames (Note: Owned by Infogrames Entertainment SA, operated by Atari, Inc.) (2000–2006); THQ (2006–2008)
- Website: www.pe-i.com at the Wayback Machine (archived July 15, 2006)

Paradigm Entertainment Inc. (previously part of Paradigm Simulation) was an American video game development company. Paradigm is perhaps best known for its vehicle simulation games. Paradigm Simulation was a 3D computer graphics company in 1990 and Paradigm primarily worked on realistic flight simulation technology for major space and aviation clients. The company got its start in game development when it was contacted by Nintendo in 1994 to aid in the creation of one of the Nintendo 64's launch titles, Pilotwings 64. The game was a critical and commercial success and the company created a simulation and entertainment division Paradigm Entertainment in 1996. The division became independent and continued to develop for Nintendo's 64-bit console. After a partnership with Video System, Paradigm was acquired as a wholly owned subsidiary of Infogrames in 2000 and began developing games for sixth-generation video game consoles. Paradigm was sold to THQ in 2006 and was ultimately closed in 2008.

== History ==
Paradigm Simulation was founded in 1990 as a company based in Addison, Texas. It initially focused on creating commercial products for graphics developers, including military training simulations for pilots and ship captains and a lengthy client list that included the United States Department of Defense, The Walt Disney Company, NASA, Lockheed Martin, Boeing, and McDonnell Douglas. Paradigm acted as a proponent of 3D computer graphics and virtual reality in the mid-1990s with its applications including the IRIS GL-based VisionWorks and the Performer-based Vega, which were used on Silicon Graphics workstations. Project sales for the company were $7 million in 1995, up from $3.5 million in 1994. During that time, the company frequented the annual Consumer Electronics Show, SIGGRAPH, and Electronic Entertainment Expo (E3) conferences with its 3D technological demonstrations.

Nintendo reportedly contacted Paradigm in 1994 after it co-developed a realistic flight simulator called "Hornet" with the entertainment company Magic Edge Inc. Through connections to Silicon Graphics, designers of the Nintendo 64, Paradigm worked for nine months starting that same year on a technology base for its own Nintendo 64 software. At E3 in May 1995, engineers from Paradigm aided Nintendo in polishing a demo of the Nintendo 64 shown for developers and distributors in a whisper suite. Paradigm partnered with Nintendo the following month to begin development on Pilotwings 64, one of the first games available for the new console worldwide. Paradigm Simulation created a new division called Paradigm Entertainment in 1996, which developed "PC Internet games" according to Paradigm's Ron Paige.. Pilotwings 64 was a success for the company, accounting for half of its revenues by the beginning of 1997 and had sold over one million copies worldwide by February 1998. In May 1996, one month prior to the console's Japanese launch, Paradigm released a turnkey development bundle titled "Fusion 64".

In March 1997, the entertainment wing was spun off to concentrate solely on video game production. Paradigm Simulation completed a merger with Multigen Inc. in October 1998 and was acquired by Computer Associates International Inc. in 2000. In the early years as an independent studio, Paradigm Entertainment had a three-game partnership with the Japanese publisher Video System. The partnership ended with a lawsuit by the Texas-based developer against Video System regarding the latter's supposed breach of contract in the development and publishing of the flight simulator Harrier 2001.

At the start of 1999, Paradigm announced another 3D rendering and development tool called "VisKit", which was intended for use in creating next-generation console games being ported to multiple systems.

=== Sale to Infogrames, THQ and closure (2000-2008) ===
On June 29, 2000, Paradigm Entertainment was acquired by Infogrames Entertainment SA for $19.5 million or up to 700,000 Infogrames shares. As part of the deal, the company's U.S. division, Infogrames, Inc., took over management operations.

After the purchase, Paradigm began to develop games for the sixth-generation consoles (PlayStation 2, GameCube, Xbox, and Dreamcast) after its final Nintendo 64 release Duck Dodgers Starring Daffy Duck. Works released during this time include an enhanced remake of the classic arcade game Spy Hunter, motocross racing games, and games based on the Terminator and Mission: Impossible multimedia franchises.

Following the stock market downturn, and in the light of poor game sales, Atari began to divest of its internal development studios in an effort to financially restructure. In spite of not having produced a profitable game in over six years, and a steady exodus of talent, Paradigm was sold in May 2006 to THQ. Although Paradigm's release Stuntman: Ignition and THQ's Juiced 2: Hot Import Nights were the parent company's top sellers in their release quarter, THQ reported overall financial losses of $16.3 million during the first half of its 2007 fiscal year. "While we have shipped more than 1 million units worldwide on each of these titles, this is significantly below our internal forecast", stated THQ's CEO Brian Farrell. "In both cases we did not receive our required game play mechanic and overall product quality targets. Quality matters and we missed the mark." On November 3, 2008, the company officially ceased operations. Paradigm's general manager Dave Gatchel went on to serve the same position at THQ's studio in Montreal and is currently working at Ubisoft Montreal following the studio's acquisition by Ubisoft in 2013. The remaining staff relocated to other companies, such as Gearbox Software.

== Games developed ==
Year	Title	Platforms	Publisher	Notes
1996	Pilotwings 64	Nintendo 64	Nintendo	Developed by Paradigm Simulation
1997	Aero Fighters Assault	Nintendo 64	Video System	
1998	F-1 World Grand Prix	Nintendo 64	Video System	
1999	Beetle Adventure Racing	Nintendo 64	Electronic Arts	Known as HSV Adventure Racing in Australia
1999	F-1 World Grand Prix II	Nintendo 64	Video System	Europe and Brazil only
2000	Duck Dodgers Starring Daffy Duck	Nintendo 64	Infogrames, Inc.	
2000	Indy Racing 2000	Nintendo 64	Infogrames, Inc.	
2001	MX Rider	PlayStation 2	Infogrames, Inc.	
2001	Spy Hunter	PlayStation 2	Midway Games	
2002	Big Air Freestyle	GameCube	Infogrames, Inc.	
2002	The Terminator: Dawn of Fate	PlayStation 2 Xbox	Infogrames, Inc.	
2003	Mission: Impossible – Operation Surma	PlayStation 2 Xbox; GameCube	Atari, Inc.	
2004	Terminator 3: The Redemption	PlayStation 2 Xbox; GameCube	Atari, Inc.	
2006	Battlezone	PlayStation Portable	Atari, Inc.	
2007	Stuntman: Ignition	Xbox 360; PlayStation 3 PlayStation 2	THQ	
