= Duck Dodgers Starring Daffy Duck =

2000 video game

- Developer: Paradigm Entertainment
- Publisher: Infogrames
- Director: Mike Engeldinger
- Producer: Kenneth Tabor
- Artist: Cash Case
- Composer: Robert Daspit
- Platform: Nintendo 64
- Release: NA: August 15, 2000; EU: October 27, 2000
- Genre: Platform
- Mode: Single-player

Duck Dodgers Starring Daffy Duck (known as Daffy Duck Starring As Duck Dodgers in PAL regions) is a platform video game for the Nintendo 64 released in 2000. Based on the 1953 theatrical cartoon, the player takes control of Daffy Duck and explores five fictional planets and saves the Earth. The object is to collect energy atoms to unlock the boss areas and defeat the bosses, whom upon defeating, opens up the next planet. This game has Rumble Pak support and allows the player to save the game directly to the cartridge with the battery back-up, rather than using a Controller Pak, as many other third-party titles on the Nintendo 64 used such to save game data.

== Gameplay ==
The player controls Duck Dodgers as he and his sidekick, the Eager Young Space Cadet, travel to five planets, collecting atoms and defeating the henchmen of Marvin the Martian. Dodgers has a kick and a jumping stomp, he can push certain objects, such as boxes or mine carts, and he can use his ray gun to stun or kill enemies. Throughout the levels are quarks, which provide health, and grant an extra life if fifty are collected. Finding Lola Bunny will also reward the player with a life.

Certain parts of the game play like a first-person shooter, and there are minigames, including basketball and a version of Pong with Dodgers's head.

== Plot ==
Marvin the Martian has developed a weapon which will finally destroy Earth, allowing Mars to conquer the universe. The weapon does not fire because it is out of atoms, its fuel, so he sends his minions to gather one hundred more across five planets. Setting out to stop him are Duck Dodgers and the Eager Young Space Cadet.

== Development ==
In October 1999, the game's release was delayed to the summer of 2000.

== Reception ==
Reception

Aggregate scores
Aggregator	Score
GameRankings	72.73%
Metacritic	69/100

Review scores
Publication	Score
Electronic Gaming Monthly	4/10
GameFan	77%
GameSpot	5.8/10
IGN	7.6/10
N64 Magazine	75%
Nintendo Power	7.9/10

IGN gave Duck Dodgers Starring Daffy Duck a good 7.6 out of 10 overall praising the game's presentation but had criticism with the blurry graphics and the gameplay because of "super loose control and difficult camera movements". Overall reviews were mixed. GameRankings gave it a score of 72.73%, while Metacritic gave it 69 out of 100.
