= Atari 2600+ =

Video game console released in 2023

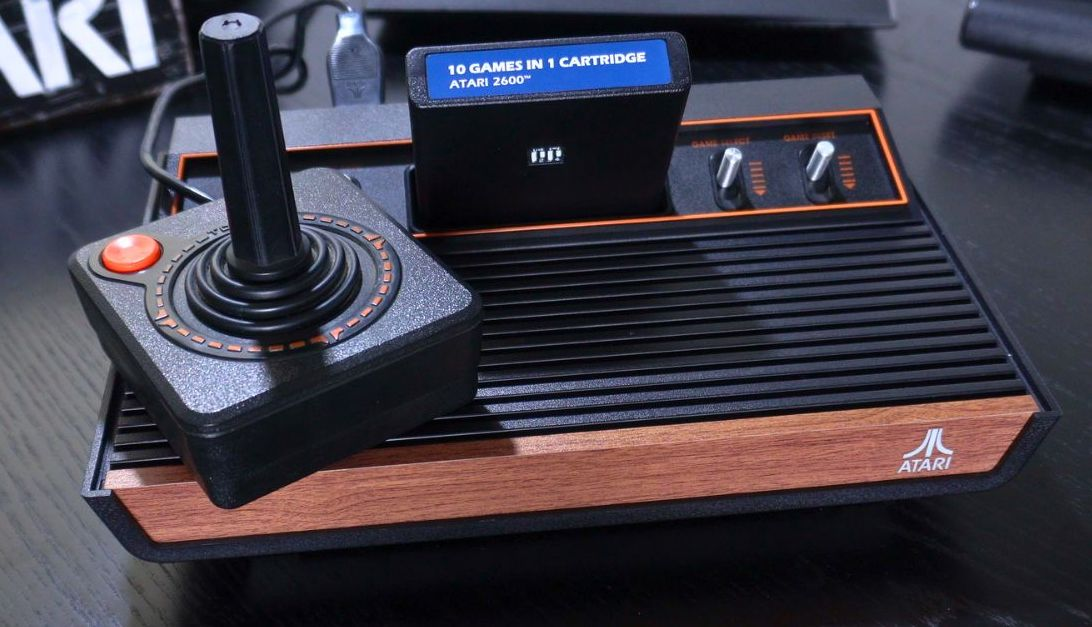
- Atari 2600+ console with bundled joystick and 10-in-1 cartridge
- Developer: Atari, Inc.
- Manufacturer: Plaion
- Type: Home video game console
- Generation: Ninth
- Released: WW: November 17, 2023
- CPU: Rockchip 3128
- Memory: 256MB DDR3 RAM
- Display: HDMI 2.0
- Dimensions: 10.6 in × 7 in × 2.8 in (26.9 cm × 17.8 cm × 7.1 cm)
- Weight: 1.3 lb (0.59 kg)
- Backward compatibility: Atari 2600 and Atari 7800
- Predecessor: Atari VCS
- Successor: Intellivision Sprint
- Website: atari.com/products/atari-2600-plus

The Atari 2600+ is a home video game console developed and produced by Atari, Inc. in collaboration with Plaion since 2023. The console is a slightly smaller replica of the four-switch woodgrain model of the Atari 2600, and supports the use of original 2600 as well as Atari 7800 cartridges. The console comes bundled with a 10-in-1 cartridge that includes several classic Atari games.

== Hardware ==
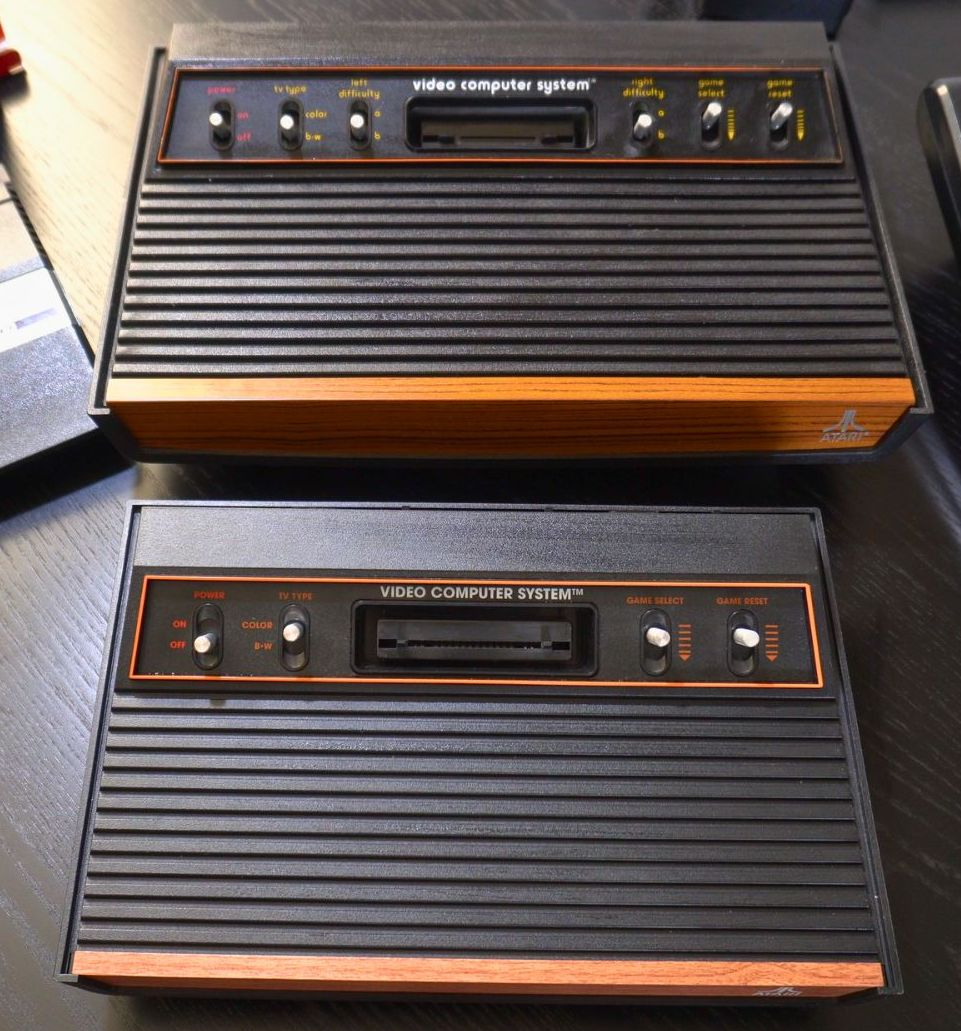
Exterior comparison of original six-switch Atari 2600 (top) and Atari 2600+ (bottom)

The 2600+ is an 80% scale replica of the 1980 CX2600-A model of the Atari 2600 and still carries the Video Computer System name on it. The system comes with a replica CX40 joystick. The joystick also uses the same hardware and therefore the system is backwards compatible with the older joysticks. The system weighs 1.3 pounds (590 g), which is less than a third of the original unit.

The display output is provided through a single HDMI interface, while power is provided by a single USB-C to USB-A cable to a wall socket. The processor is a Rockchip 3128.

== Software ==
The Atari 2600+ is backwards compatible with the vast majority of Atari 2600 and Atari 7800 cartridges. A few cartridges do not function because the system uses software-based emulation instead of a binary compatible system-on-chip hardware.

The bundled cartridge has switches itself for selecting what game to launch. It includes 10 games:

- Adventure (1980)
- Combat (1977)
- Dodge 'Em (1980)
- Haunted House (1982)
- Maze Craze (1980)
- Missile Command (1980)
- RealSports Volleyball (1982)
- Surround (1977)
- Video Pinball (1981)
- Yars' Revenge (1982)

== Development ==
The Atari 2600+ was announced on August 22, 2023. Atari, Inc. worked together with German publisher Plaion who is the manufacturing and distributing partner. The console was released in November 2023 in North America, European territories, Australia and New Zealand.

== Reception ==
Seth Macy of IGN reviewed the system and gave a score of 7 out of 10, concluding: "An attractive, emulator-based solution to reliving the 1980s in the modern era, with a dedication to recreating the original experience that's both a blessing and a curse." PC World's Ida Blix, with a score of 4 out of 5, praised the design and cartridge backwards compatibility, but was critical of the price and that it only comes with one controller. Phil Hayton of GamesRadar+ called it an "awesome recreation" of the original system, and further stated that "after 46 years, I might retire my original console, as the newcomer is a worthy successor." The Guardian's Keith Stuart, however, commented that "as with many pop cultural relics from the 1970s, the charm and novelty may wear off too soon, the weirdness and limitations all too obvious". He also thought it was expensive compared to what the Atari Flashback offers.

== See also ==
- Atari Flashback series
- Atari VCS (2021 console)
