= Midwest Scientific =

American computer company

Midwest Scientific Instruments, Inc.

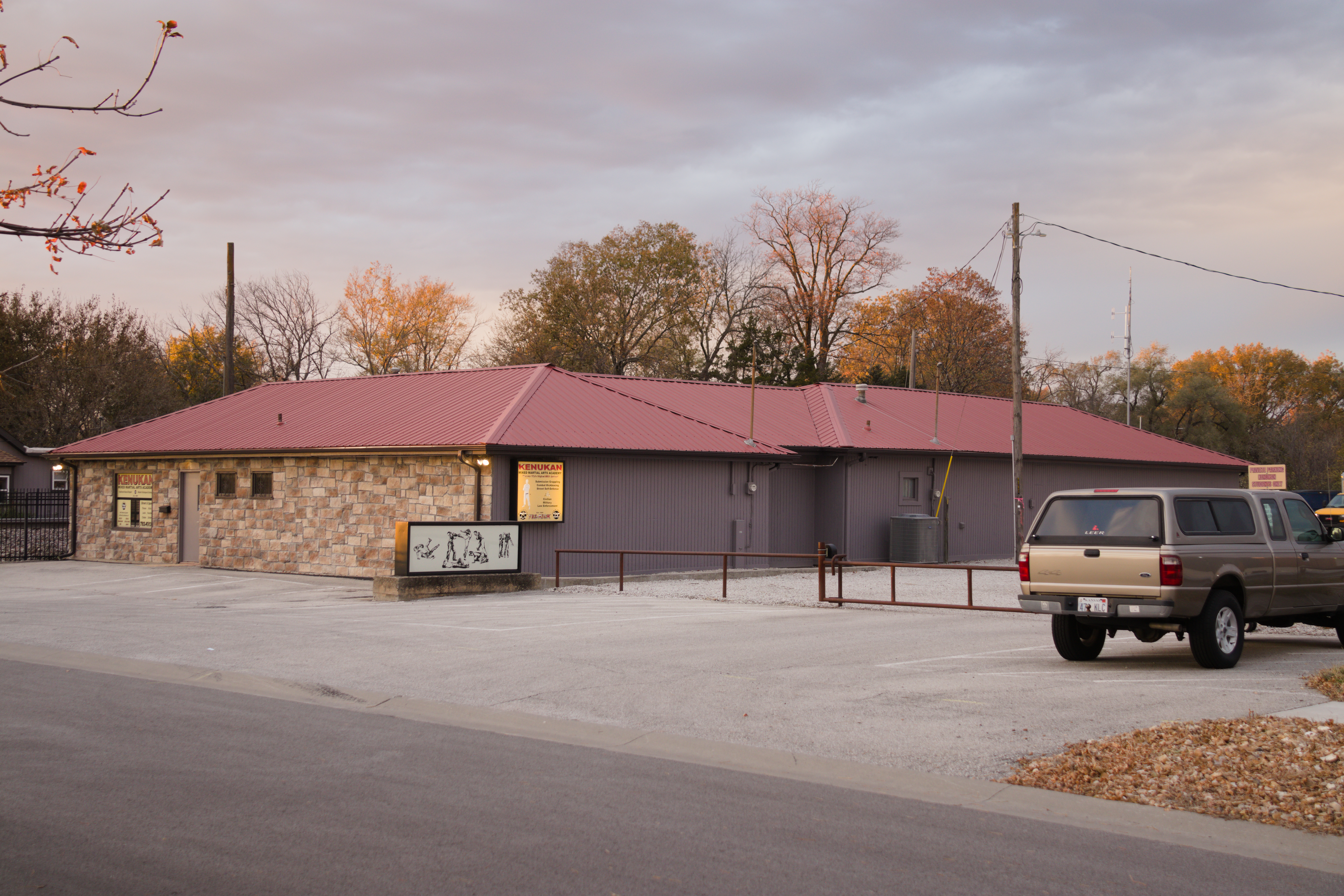
- Site of former headquarters in Olathe, Kansas, pictured in 2023
- Type: Private
- Industry: Computer
- Founded: 1972; 54 years ago in Olathe, Kansas
- Founder: Charles C. Childress
- Defunct: 1985; 41 years ago
- Fate: Dissolved
- Products: MSI 6800
- Number of employees: 10 (1976)

Midwest Scientific Instruments, Inc. (MSI), often shortened to Midwest Scientific, was an American computer company founded in Olathe, Kansas, in the early 1970s. Charles C. Childress, a doctorate of biochemistry, founded the company as a way to market his data acquisition and processing interfaces based on programmable calculators for medical, scientific, and industrial uses. After an after-market floppy drive system for the SWTPC 6800 proved a hot-seller for Midwest in 1976, the company began products for general-purpose computers like the SWTPC. In 1977, they released their own microcomputer, the MSI 6800—a clone of the SWTPC 6800. Their sales tripled that year and prompted expansion in the Kansas City area. It survived into the mid-1980s before going defunct and having its remaining assets auctioned off.

== Foundation (1968–1976) ==
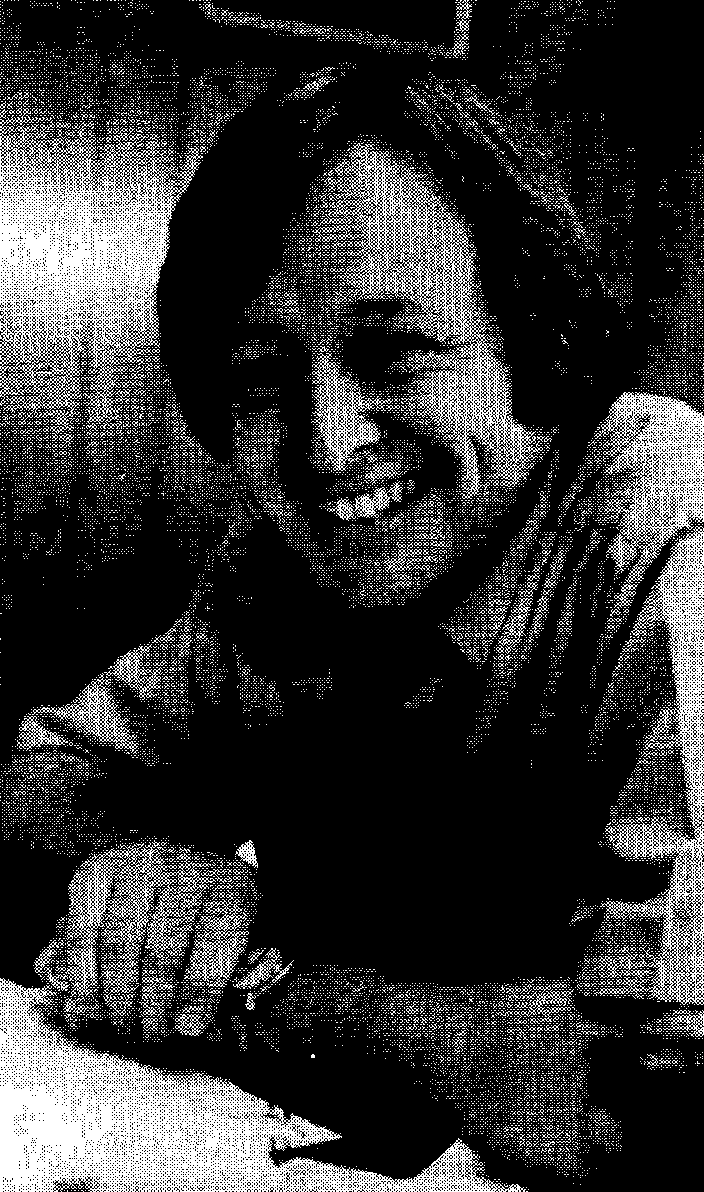
Founder Charles C. Childress, pictured in 1978

1978 catalog of Midwest Scientific, showcasing microcomputer products

Charles C. Childress (born c. 1940 in Webb City, Missouri) founded Midwest Scientific in 1970 or 1971 and formally incorporated it in downtown Olathe, Kansas, in 1972. Before founding Midwest Scientific, Childress worked as a technical director at Upsher Laboratories, a medical laboratory in Kansas City, Missouri. While working for Upsher he studied for his doctorate in biochemistry at Johns Hopkins University, after earning his Master of Science at the Kansas State College of Pittsburg, and before that earning his Bachelor of Science at the University of Great Falls while also serving in the U.S. Air Force. He earned his PhD in 1969.

Midwest Scientific's first product was the Model 750 Laboratory Interface, a data acquisition and processing interface for Wang Laboratories' 700 series of programmable calculators, introduced in 1972. The Model 750 processed input from blood analyzers, hematology analyzers, scintillation counters, and spectrophotometers. A prototype of the Model 750 was built between 1968 and 1969 and demoed to Wang Laboratories. Wang asked Childress to write a white paper describing the interface's functionality; following publication of this paper, Childress received a flurry of interest by way of Wang. Childress decided to leave Upsher to start up Midwest Scientific to fill the apparent gap in data processing within medical laboratories, which he himself had witnessed as director at Upsher, tabulation taking many hours and prone to errors even with calculators. Within a year, Midwest Scientific had sold nearly twenty-five Model 750s. (Depending on configuration, the systems cost between $8,000 to $50,000.) In the beginning of 1973, the company began moving into process control, designing another programmable calculator–based control system for a local cement plant that printed instructions to the plant operators after being fed material data.

== Microcomputers and growth (1976–1981) ==
The company grew to having ten employees, including Childress, on its payroll in 1976. By this point he still had crucial roles at all phases of production—from designing the products to servicing equipment. By the mid-1970s the company had customers throughout the United States and Canada; when it came to out-of-state meetings, Childress preferred flying in his twin-engine private plane at the time.

In late 1976, the company delivered one of the first floppy disk drive systems based on the SS-50 bus for microcomputers. It proved extremely popular, prompting Childress to lead a team in designing the company's first full general-purpose microcomputer. In 1977, it was released as the MSI 6800, a clone of the SWTPC 6800. Like the SWTPC 6800, it featured a SS-50 bus with a 16-slot backplane and a Motorola 6800 microprocessor clocked at 2 MHz. With a floppy controller card, the computer can support dual 5.25-inch disk drives in its internal drive bays, or more externally; a 76 MB external hard drive unit is also supported. RAM as stock was 8 KB, albeit customers most commonly outfit it with 64 KB. An optional 6809 co-processor board bumped the maximum amount of RAM to 386 KB. A 4-KB ROM chip holds MIKBUG, a system monitor.

With the release of the MSI 6800, Midwest was the only company in Kansas City in the burgeoning field of microcomputers. The company posted a tripling of sales by the end of 1977, prompting Childress to expand the company's premises beyond its 220 West Cedar manufacturing plant and 106 East Park sales office. He negotiated buying lots in near the Johnson County Industrial Airport or adjacent to the current manufacturing plant, although he was disappointed in the lackluster tax breaks from Johnson County, given that the company was relatively small as a manufacturing outlet. In 1979, the company opened another manufacturing plant at Olathe's Park Cherry Building at 100 East Park Street.

== Decline, dissolution, and sale (1981–1985) ==
By 1981, Midwest Scientific had primarily focused on providing after-market upgrade hardware products for SS-50 computers. In 1983, the company still employed ten people, according to the Journal of Commerce. By spring 1985, Midwest Scientific had gone out of business; between May and June that year, the company's remaining manufacturing equipment and spare parts were auctioned to the public.
