= MX Rider =

2001 racing video game

- Developer: Paradigm Entertainment
- Publisher: Infogrames Europe (Note: Released under the Atari brand name)
- Platform: PlayStation 2
- Release: PAL: October 26, 2001; NA: October 30, 2001
- Genre: Racing
- Modes: Single-player, multiplayer

MX Rider (often stylized as MXrider) is a racing video game developed by Paradigm Entertainment and published by Infogrames Europe in 2001. It was the first title released under Infogrames' newly reinvented Atari brand, which Infogrames used alongside their branding until 2003. MX Rider features over 10 real Grand Prix riders and includes all the tracks from the 2000 world motocross GP championship.

An enhanced port of the game, titled Big Air Freestyle, was released for the GameCube in 2002. This version does not include the FIA license

Note: The cover art shown here is not the normal released version of the game. This image contains the signatures of the members of the development team. It was typical at Paradigm Entertainment for development team members to autograph each other's copies at the game's release party.

== Reception ==
Reception

Aggregate score
Aggregator	Score
Metacritic	69/100

Review scores
Publication	Score
AllGame	3/5
Edge	5/10
Game Informer	7/10
GamesMaster	61%
GameSpot	7.2/10
GameSpy	88%
GameZone	8.5/10
IGN	6.2/10
PlayStation Official Magazine – UK	6/10
Official U.S. PlayStation Magazine	3.5/5

The game received "average" reviews according to the review aggregation website Metacritic.
