= Atari, Inc. (formerly GT Interactive) =

American video game company since 2003

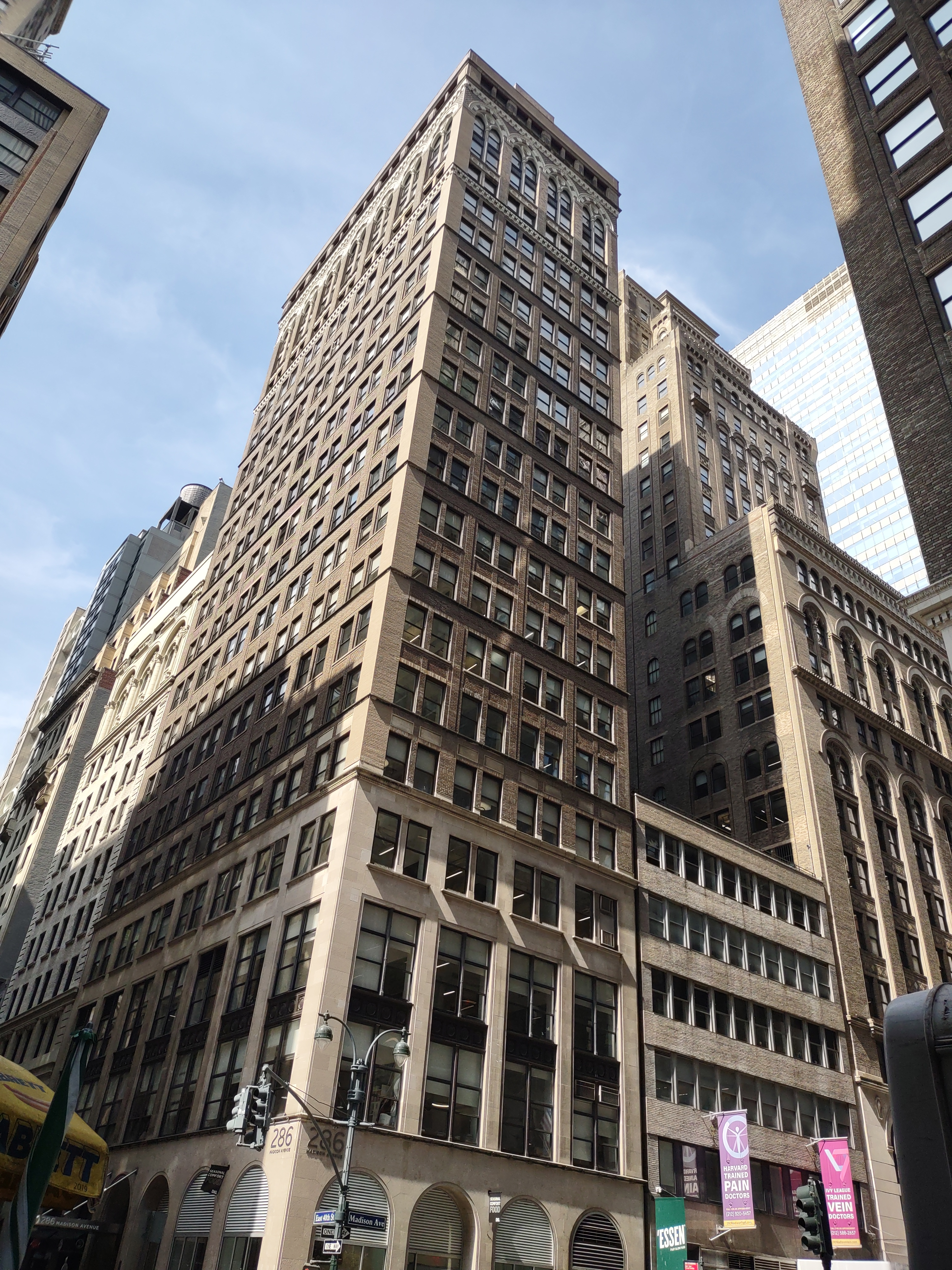
- Atari's headquarters at 286 Madison Avenue in Midtown Manhattan
- Formerly: GT Interactive Software Corp. (1993–2000); Infogrames, Inc. (2000–2003)
- Type: Subsidiary
- Traded as: Nasdaq: ATAR
- Industry: Video games
- Founded: February 1993; 33 years ago
- Founders: Ron Chaimowitz; Joseph Cayre; Kenneth Cayre; Stanley Cayre
- Headquarters: New York City, New York, U.S.
- Key people: Wade J. Rosen (chairman, CEO); Alex Zyngier (director)
- Products: Oddworld; Unreal; Driver; Neverwinter Nights; RollerCoaster Tycoon; Bubsy; Atari Recharged; Atari Flashback consoles (pre-2011 models); Atari 2600+; Intellivision
- Parent: GoodTimes Entertainment (1993–1999); Atari SA (1999–2008, majority; 2008–present)
- Website: atari.com

Atari, Inc. is an American video gaming company based in New York City, and a subsidiary of the Atari SA holding company. It is the main entity serving the commercial Atari brand globally since 2003. The company currently publishes games based on retro Atari franchises as well as some new content, and also produces the new Atari 2600+ console. In the past it produced titles including Neverwinter Nights, Driver 3, Fahrenheit, RollerCoaster Tycoon 3 and Test Drive Unlimited.

Its origins date to GT Interactive Software Corp. in 1993, which published games such as Doom II, Quake, Driver, and the first Unreal. Infogrames acquired the majority of the company's shares in 1999, and subsequently renamed it to Infogrames, Inc. Two years after Infogrames's purchase of the Atari brand and assets from Hasbro Interactive, the company was rebranded to Atari, Inc., initially serving as Infogrames's US operations. In 2008 it became a wholly owned subsidiary of Infogrames, now known as Atari SA, and activities were largely consolidated into Atari Inc.

== History ==
=== As GT Interactive ===
==== Beginnings and growth ====
GT Interactive logo

GT Interactive Software Corp. was founded in February 1993 in New York as the video game publishing division of GoodTimes Home Video, a video-tape distributor owned by the Cayre family, with Ron Chaimowitz as co-founder and president. In its first year, revenue reached $10.3 million. Their first product was the retail release of Wolfenstein 3D. GT was unusual among many publishers as they allowed developers they contracted to retain their intellectual property.

GT Interactive revenue soared 880% and reached $101 million in its second year of existence, with profits reaching $18 million. GT Interactive's partnership with id Software scored another hit with Doom II: Hell on Earth, which was released in October 1994 and sold over 2 million copies. That year, Harry M. Rubin became chief financial officer. In February 1995, GT Interactive obtained the publishing rights to games based on Mercer Mayer property, which included Little Critter and Little Monster. GT Interactive began to set up displays at Kmart and Walmart for low cost software. GT Interactive signed an exclusive software supplier agreement with Walmart that meant, according to UBS Securities analyst Michael Wallace, "All software developers have to deal with GT if they want to sell in a Walmart."

In March 1995, GT Interactive signed a $35 million deal with Midway Games to become the exclusive distributor for Midway products outside North America for four years, to end in 1998, and was later expanded to end at the end of March 2000.

==== Initial public offering ====
In December 1995, GT Interactive debuted on the NASDAQ stock exchange under the stock symbol GTIS. Raising $140 million with its initial public offering, it was one of the biggest IPOs of the year. GT Interactive offered 10 million shares to the public at $14 each. During GT Interactive's IPO, Joseph Cayre sold more than 1.4 million shares, 9.2% of his shares, for a $20 million return. GT Interactive reported a strong revenue growth of 134% in the year to $234.4 million but, in the first sign of trouble ahead, profits increased a meager 23% to $22.6 million.

In January 1996, GT Interactive obtained the publishing rights for the highly anticipated Quake from id Software. The game was released in June of that year to huge success, selling 1.8 million copies, becoming a PC classic. In February, GT Interactive and Target signed an agreement in which GT Interactive became the primary consumer software supplier to all Target's 675 stores.

By 1996, GT Interactive began expanding by purchasing other publishers and distributors. The company purchased budget publisher WizardWorks for 2.4 million shares on June 25, which would form together as part of the company's GT Value Products division. WizardWorks' Macintosh publishing division MacSoft became a stand-alone division of GT. On 1 July, they purchased FormGen for 1 million shares and followed this up on July 11 by purchasing Humongous Entertainment for 3.5 million shares, or $76 million. Humongous formed as the first developer owned by the publisher, and their revenue had risen to $10 million in 1995, an increase of 233% over 1994's revenue of $3 million. In November, GT would gain an expanded distribution arm in Western Europe by purchasing Warner Interactive Europe (including Renegade Software) from Time Warner for $6.3 million in cash.

In a sign of uncertainty for its future, GT Interactive, for the year, reported a net income increase of only 11% over the previous year to $25.1 million. Revenue growth also decelerated to 56%, revenue for the year was $365 million. Making matters worse, net income in the fourth quarter reduced 16.8% to $8.5 million when compared to 1995's fourth quarter.

==== Continued acquisitions ====
In January 1997, GT Interactive bought One Stop, a European value software publisher, for $800,000 in cash. In June GT Interactive signed a deal with MTV, the deal gave GT Interactive the rights to publish games based on Beavis and Butt-head and Æon Flux. By October, GT Interactive added their second developer purchase to their portfolio - SingleTrac, for $14.7 million — $5.4 million in cash and $9.3 million in stock. SingleTrac owned and developed such games as Twisted Metal and Jet Moto. In September, Humongous division Cavedog Entertainment, made its first release, Total Annihilation, which sold more than 1 million copies.

On October 5, 1997, GT Interactive announced that it had signed a definitive agreement to acquire MicroProse for $250 million in stock; the deal had even been unanimously approved by the Board of Directors of both companies and was expected to be completed by the end of that year. The merger would have made GT Interactive the second largest U.S. gaming software company, exceeded only by Electronic Arts. But on December 5 the acquisition was cancelled, according to both CEOs "the time is simply not right" for the deal. MicroProse's stock plummeted after the announcement of the deal's cancellation. GT Interactive's result was negatively affected because, in March, they stopped being the exclusive computer software distributor to Walmart, who decided to buy its software directly from the publishers.

In 1997, GT Interactive's share of the entertainment software market reached a historical low of 6.4% down from the record highs of 9% and 10% years earlier. GT Interactive was a leader only on the arcade/action category, with a 20.3% market share. Making matters worse, GT Interactive also had a high debt/equity ratio of 41%; for comparison, Electronic Arts had a debt/equity ratio of just 8%. For 1997 GT Interactive's return on equity was a dismal -16.14%. For the year, GT Interactive's revenue growth continued to decelerate, increased only 45% to $530 million. During 1997 GT Interactive posted its first net loss, totaling $25 million.

In May 1998, Epic Games's Unreal, which was published through GT, sold over 800,000 copies. For WizardWorks, Deer Hunter II, which was released in October, also sold 800,000 copies. In November, GT Interactive bought OneZero Media for $17.2 million in stock and $20 million in total, becoming the first game publisher to own an entertainment Internet website. In the fourth quarter of 1998, GT Interactive posted a net income of $16.7 million on revenues of $246.3 million. For the year, GT Interactive reported revenues were almost flat rising 10% to $584 million, but GT Interactive swung into black by posting a $20.3 million net income (results from the fiscal year ending on December 31, 1998).

In January 1999, GT Interactive started the year with two additional developer purchases; Legend Entertainment, a developer which commonly published its titles through GT and British based Reflections Interactive. Legend was purchased for $2 million, while Reflections was purchased for a reported 2.7 million shares of common stock, which was valued at around US$14.17 million. In the same month, GT Interactive filed a lawsuit against Midway Games for a breach of contract for failing to inform them of new game releases and trying to run off with the money from the deal. The lawsuit ended on good faith between both companies six months later.

During the year, GT Interactive posted first-quarter losses of $90 million due to restructuring costs. In February, in light of the bad results, CEO Ron Chaimowitz was replaced. Game sales in 1999 fell in comparison to 1998, which had dire consequences on GT Interactive's finances. In April, GT Interactive predicted for 2000 a first quarter loss of $55 million on revenues of around just $95 million. A failure to release 5 major games and a planned relocation to Los Angeles added to the losses. In June GT Interactive announced it had hired Bear Stearns to look into the possibility of either a merger or a sale of the company and in October GT Interactive fired 35% of its workforce, or 650 employees, mostly from its distribution section. In June, Reflections-developed Driver was released, selling approximately 1 million copies. In July GT Interactive sold OneZero Media for $5.2 million in cash, just six months after it was purchased.

=== Purchase by Infogrames ===
On November 16, France-based Infogrames Entertainment SA (IESA) announced that it would buy 70% of GT Interactive for $135 million and assume $10.5 million in debt, a deal completed by December 17. IESA's acquisition came just in time because GT Interactive's 1999 results were dismal. Revenues fell 30% to $408 million in 1999 and GT Interactive posted a net loss of $254 million for the year (results with the fiscal year ending on December 31, 1999). Infogrames' purchase of GT Interactive allowed the company to hold a "distribution network for all of its products in the United States".

In February 2000, GT announced the closure of Humongous subsidiary Cavedog Entertainment as part of a post-purchase restructuring. On May 10, IESA announced that the company would be renamed from GT Interactive, Inc. to Infogrames, Inc. to better represent the Infogrames brand in the country. In June 2000, IESA purchased developer Paradigm Entertainment for $19.5 million and placed them under the ownership of Infogrames, Inc. In October, IESA's former North American arm, the California-based Infogrames North America, Inc. (which was formerly Accolade), was consolidated into the new Infogrames, Inc. and hence became IESA's de-facto North American division. In December 2000, Infogrames, Inc. secured a licensing deal to publish games based on the Dragon Ball media franchise from its North American license holder FUNimation.

In January 2001, IESA completed the sale of Hasbro Interactive (which had been renamed Infogrames Interactive, Inc.) and folded its North American publishing arms under Infogrames, Inc., allowing the company to publish titles featuring Hasbro licenses and the legendary Atari brand. In October, Infogrames, Inc. and Infogrames Europe licensed the Atari brand from Infogrames Interactive and began using it as a secondary publishing label for their core titles aimed towards an 18-34 year-old market. MX Rider, Splashdown and TransWorld Surf were the first three titles to be branded under the reinvented name.

In May 2002, Infogrames, Inc. announced they had purchased Shiny Entertainment from the struggling Interplay Entertainment for $47 million. The deal also included the worldwide video game rights to The Matrix franchise and the upcoming video game title Enter the Matrix. Although not a critical success when it was released in May 2003, it represented itself as being one of the most expensive video games ever developed and was a sales success for Infogrames, sold 1.38 million units for the PlayStation 2 and 1 million units for the GameCube.

On 30 January 2003, the company sold its Mac publishing division, MacSoft, to Destineer, a Minnetonka-based publisher founded by company founder Peter Tamte. The deal included all rights to titles released through the division as well as an exclusive agreement for MacSoft to remain the publisher for Mac ports of Infogrames titles.

=== As Atari Inc. ===
On May 8, 2003, Infogrames Entertainment SA announced that they would rebrand all its subsidiaries under the Atari brand name. Infogrames, Inc. would license the Atari brand from Atari Interactive, Inc. and would be renamed as Atari, Inc., becoming 'ATAR' on the NASDAQ stock market. In November 2004, James Caparro became CEO. However, Caparro resigned in June 2005.

Titles released during this time included critical and commercial flops such as Driver 3, released in June 2004. However, much of Atari, Inc.'s profits and sales figures came from Dragon Ball titles, including the Dragon Ball Z: Budokai series of games and the Dragon Ball Z: The Legacy of Goku series of games for the Game Boy Advance. These games have topped the best-seller charts for numerous console platforms since the release of Atari's first Dragon Ball Z game, The Legacy of Goku in 2002, which was the first Dragon Ball game to be made by an American company, Webfoot Technologies. In January 2005, Atari and Funimation renewed their partnership for the franchise and with that released more titles including Dragon Ball Z: Supersonic Warriors, Dragon Ball Z: Super Sonic Warriors 2, Dragon Ball Z: Sagas, Dragon Ball GT: Transformation, Dragon Ball: Advanced Adventure and Super Dragon Ball Z. Another lineup of licensed titles was those based on Godzilla, developed by Pipeworks Software. The series started with Godzilla: Destroy All Monsters Melee for the GameCube which was released on October 11, 2002, to much success before it was ported to the Microsoft Xbox a year later. It was followed by a sequel, Godzilla: Save the Earth for the PlayStation 2 and the Xbox, on November 16, 2004. Despite Save the Earth's relative commercial failure, Godzilla: Unleashed was released for the PS2 on November 20, 2007, and the Wii on December 5, 2007. Unleashed was accompanied by Godzilla Unleashed: Double Smash for the Nintendo DS, which was released on November 20, 2007.

Alongside new releases, Atari, Inc. also released compilations honoring the classic Atari library, including Atari Anthology on PC and consoles, Atari Masterpieces in two volumes on Nokia N-Gage, and Retro Atari Classics for Nintendo DS. The company went into hardware in 2004 with Atari Flashback, designed and produced by Atari consultant Curt Vendel through his engineering firm Legacy Engineering. With only a 10-week development window, what they produced looked like a miniature version of the Atari 7800 console originally released in 1984. Twenty classic Atari titles were built into the system. The success of Flashback led to the creation of a follow-up Flashback 2, released in August 2005, based on an implementation of the original Atari 2600 on a single chip that Curt Vendel designed, allowing the original 2600 games to be run instead of ports as in the first Flashback. A total of forty titles were available for the system, including Pitfall! licensed from Activision. From 2011 onwards, the Flashback series was licensed out to AtGames.

==== Continued profit losses and closure/sale of studios ====
In September 2003, the former MicroProse studio in Hunt Valley, Maryland, which had been under the Infogrames/Atari brand after the Hasbro Interactive sale, was closed by Atari. It remained the sole ex-MicroProse development studio in operation after the British studio in Chippenham was closed the previous year. Atari's VP of corporate communications, Nancy Bushkin, stated that the closure of the studio was a "straightforward business decision" as the studio had no other projects in the works after completing Dungeons & Dragons: Heroes.

On January 16, 2004, Atari announced that they had also shuttered Legend Entertainment, following the completion of the eXpanded MultiPlayer expansion for Unreal II: The Awakening. On March 30, the Minneapolis development studio, formerly WizardWorks, was also shuttered. Its titles, such as the Deer Hunter franchise, were moved over to the Beverly publishing branch. On 29 July, Epic Games announced that it would end its publishing agreement with Atari for the Unreal franchise and signed a new deal with Midway beginning with Unreal Championship 2: The Liandri Conflict in 2005. Epic also stated that Atari would continue to publish the existing Unreal back catalog for the foreseeable Future.

On February 10, 2005, Atari announced the closure of their Santa Monica and Beverly publishing offices and that publishing would be reassigned to a singular branch in New York City. In Atari's fourth quarter results in June, they announced that they would divest and dispose of various "non-core" assets that they no longer saw as part of their upcoming strategic vision or creative directions. In August 2005, the company laid off the development portion of Humongous Entertainment and divested what was now named Humongous, Inc. over to Infogrames for shares worth US$10.3 million, but retaining a distribution deal for Humongous' titles up until March 2006. which was later extended to March 2007. Infogrames would take over the Humongous brand shortly afterward.

Throughout 2006, Atari underwent a restructuring in an attempt to raise cash and stave off the threat of a possible bankruptcy. The company announced at the beginning of the year that it would put a select amount of intellectual properties and its self-owned development studios, alongside Eden Games (owned directly by Infogrames), up for sale. The company began its asset sale on May 10; selling the Games.com web portal, an inheritated portion from Infogrames' purchase of Hasbro Interactive, to AOL, Paradigm Entertainment to THQ as well as the rights to the Stuntman franchise and its then-upcoming sequel, and the publishing rights for TimeShift to Vivendi Games. The sales would generate $25 million in revenue for the company. On June 17, On June 17, Midway Games announced that they had acquired the publishing rights to the Unreal back catalog from Atari. On July 13, Reflections Interactive and the Driver franchise were sold to Ubisoft for $21.6 million. On 2 October, Shiny Entertainment was sold for $1.6 million to Foundation 9 Entertainment; a large drop in price from when Atari originally purchased the studio. The final studio sold as part of the restructuring, Atari Melbourne House, was sold on 2 November to Krome Studios, a fellow Australian development studio.

On September 1, Atari, Inc. announced that its stock faced delisting from the Nasdaq stock exchange due to its price having fallen below $1.00. Games released during this time included Neverwinter Nights 2, continuing on Atari's licensing agreement with Hasbro, and Test Drive Unlimited, developed by Eden Games of France which was directly owned under Infogrames. In the same year, Infogrames fired the majority of Atari's directors and laid off 20% of its workforce. For the 2006–2007 fiscal year, Atari posted a net loss of $70 million.

On November 7, 2007, GameSpot reported that Atari was running out of money, losing $ 12 million in the first fiscal quarter of 2008. On November 13, Atari announced that they would officially exit the game development market to focus solely on publishing and distribution of titles, and that their CEO, David Pierce, had resigned. On the same day, they also announced that they had licensed out the Test Drive franchise to Infogrames under a six-year, $5 million deal.

==== Atari and Infogrames merger ====
On 6 March 2008, IESA announced that it would purchase out all remaining public shares in Atari, Inc. for a value of US$1.68 per share or US$11 million total, making the publisher privately owned. Atari, Inc. accepted the offer on April 30 which would soon lead to NASDAQ delisting them from the NASDAQ stock exchange on May 9 While Atari attempted to appeal, they had received notice of its absolute delisting on 12 September 2008. The Infogrames merger was officially completed on October 9, making Atari, Inc. a privately owned company. The deal allowed for Infogrames to have full control over the North America Atari brand (In 2002, Natsume founded Atari in Japan). David Pierce was the company's last CEO before management was consolidated with Infogrames. Infogrames said that it planned to reduce administrative costs and to focus on online gaming. At the end of May 2009, Infogrames Entertainment SA was renamed as Atari SA, allowing for all subsidiaries to be branded under the single "Atari" moniker.

Games released during this period included Eden Games' Alone in the Dark reboot, released in 2008, Ghostbusters: The Video Game in 2009 and Test Drive Unlimited 2 in 2011. Atari was one of the companies using British legal company Davenport Lyons in 2008 to recover damages from computer users illegally downloading games. It stopped using the company when they were made aware of the false claims being made against innocent members of the public.

Atari, Inc., including its fellow American subsidiaries, filed for bankruptcy in 2013. During Atari's bankruptcy sale in July 2013, most assets corresponding to GT Interactive were sold to Tommo, Inc., and later Billionsoft.

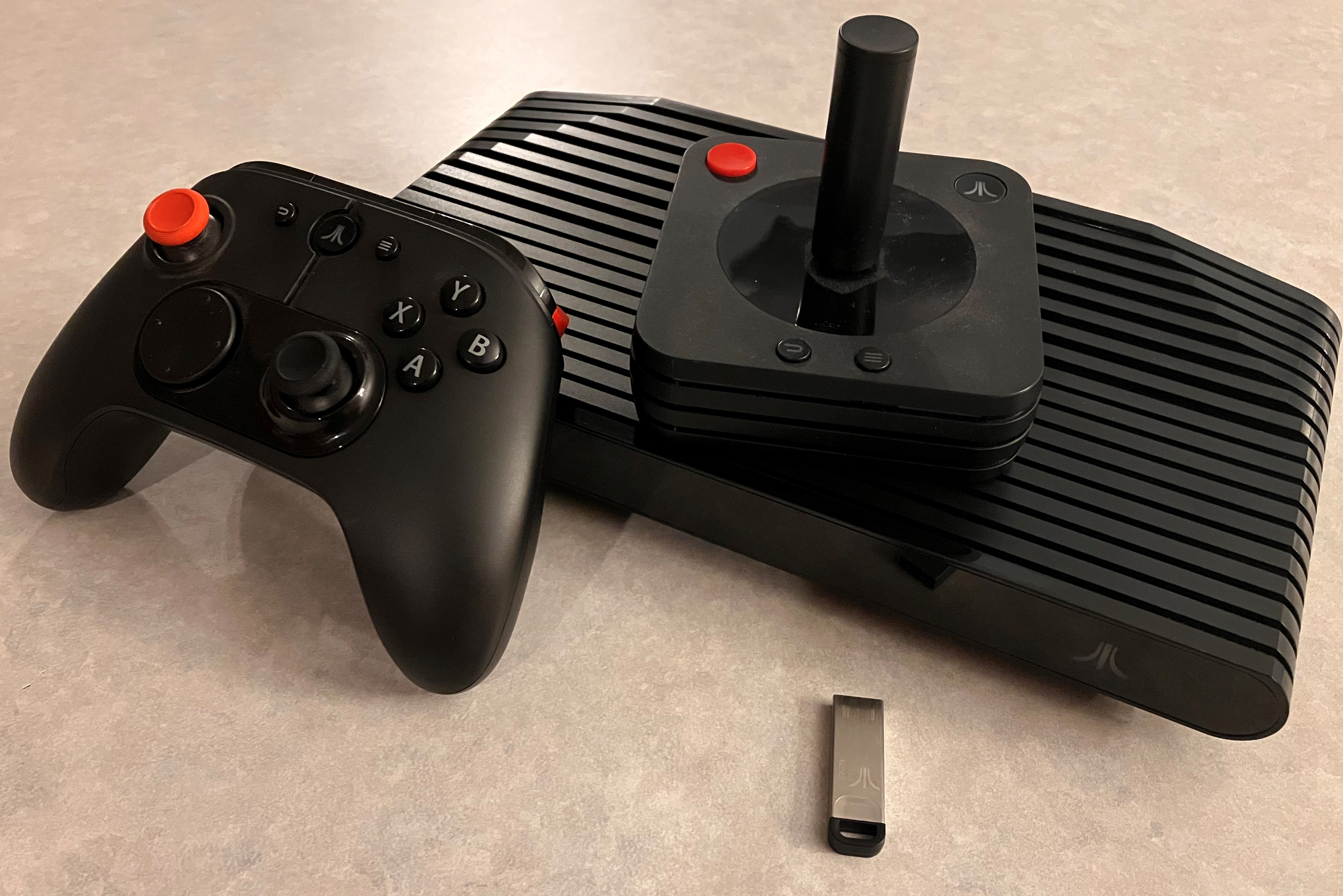
Atari VCS (2021)

The company exited bankruptcy within a year, and following this, its parent group had a new corporate strategy revolving around new audiences outside the gaming industry, and mobile games, leading to lessened activities by Atari, Inc. The first release of note was Alone in the Dark: Illumination in 2015, which was universally panned by critics. For the rest of the decade, the company mainly released new titles in the RollerCoaster Tycoon series on various platforms, including RollerCoaster Tycoon World (2016), RollerCoaster Tycoon Classic (2017) and RollerCoaster Tycoon Adventures (2019), but during this period also released Tempest 4000, developed by Llamasoft (Jeff Minter) as a sequel to the original Tempest, on various systems including the Atari VCS.

==== Recharged series and new hardware ====
With a renewed focus of its parent company, led by Wade Rosen, on Atari's retro library and IPs, in 2022 Atari released Kombinera, the first original IP title that Atari produced in many years. It is a puzzle-platformer, developed by Graphite Lab, and a game that fits into the "Atari gameplay motif" as part of the corporate strategy. 2023 saw the release of Mr. Run and Jump on consoles and computers, as well as a remake of Haunted House, developed by Orbit Studio. Atari have also been releasing remakes of classics under the Atari Recharged series since 2021.

In March 2023, Atari Game Pool was launched on Republic's Fig. On April 20, 2023, Atari re-purchased select titles that had previously been sold to Tommo and Billionsoft, including the GT Interactive brand.

At CES 2023, Atari partnered with My Arcade who produced three dedicated consoles under license with built-in Atari classics: the Atari Gamestation Plus, Pocket Player, and Micro Player. In August 2023, Atari announced the 2600+ console, a product developed by Atari, Inc. and separate from the VCS and Flashback series. In March 2024, Atari announced that it would bring its Atari Recharged series to arcades, which would be the first Atari arcade game since 1999's San Francisco Rush 2049. (Note: Not counting a combined rerelease of the original versions of Centipede, Millipede and Missile Command produced in 2001) Another recreated hardware, Atari 7800+, was announced in August 2024, alongside Atari reissusing cartridges of old titles. Yars Rising was released in September 2024.

== Former subsidiaries ==
Name	Location	Acquired/established	Closed/divested	Fate	Ref
Atari Interactive Hunt Valley Studio	Hunt Valley, Maryland, United States	2001	2003	Originally acquired in Hasbro Interactive purchase by Infogrames. While it remained under the ownership of the company (renamed to Infogrames Interactive, Inc.), Infogrames, Inc. managed the studio for them. Was known aS Infogrames Interactive Hunt Valley Studio from 2001 to 2002. Closed by Atari.	
Cavedog Entertainment	City of Industry, United States	1996	2000	Acquired with Humongous, Closed	
Humongous, Inc.	City of Industry, United States	1996	2005	Sold to Infogrames Entertainment SA	
Legend Entertainment	Virginia, United States	1999	2004	Closed	
MacSoft	United States	1996	2003	Sold to Destineer	
Paradigm Entertainment	Carrollton, United States	2000	2006	Owned by Infogrames Entertainment, managed by Infogrames, Inc. Sold to THQ	
Reflections Interactive	Newcastle upon Tyne, United Kingdom	1998	2006	Sold to Ubisoft	
Shiny Entertainment	Laguna Beach, United States	2002	2006	Purchased from Interplay Entertainment; sold to Foundation 9 Entertainment	
SingleTrac	Salt Lake City, United States	1997	2000	Closed	
WizardWorks	Plymouth, Minnesota	1996	2004	Closed	

== See also ==
- History of video games
