= PowerA =

American video game accessories manufacturer

- Type: Subsidiary
- Industry: Video game accessory manufacturing
- Founded: 2009
- Headquarters: Woodinville, Washington, United States
- Area served: Worldwide
- Products: Video Game Accessories
- Parent: ACCO Brands USA LLC.
- Subsidiaries: Lucid Sound, Inc.
- Website: www.powera.com

PowerA is an American video game peripheral manufacturer based in Woodinville, Washington. The company is most known for its MOGA line of controllers. The company was acquired by ACCO Brands on December 17, 2020 for $340 Million.

== MOGA controller series ==
The original MOGA controller (later branded the MOGA Pocket) was released on October 21, 2012. connects to Android phones via Bluetooth and can hold any phone up to 3.2 inches wide through its MOGA Arm, an extendable phone grip that folds in when not in use. MOGA-optimized apps can be found and installed through the MOGA Pivot app. It is powered by two triple-A batteries.

Released April 15, 2013, The MOGA Pro featured a new larger design with an added D-pad and four shoulder buttons. It looks similar to the Xbox 360 controller. The battery system was updated to an internal USB rechargeable battery. VentureBeat's Dean Takahashi called it "one of the many new devices that will aid smartphones and tablets in their attempt to dethrone dedicated game consoles and portable game controllers".

The MOGA Hero Power was released October 28, 2013. Keeping the same button scheme as the Pro controller, it was made smaller and more portable. Also, the ability to charge your phone while playing was added, due to a built-in 1800 mAh internal battery, deemed MOGA Boost Technology.

The MOGA Pro Power was released November 4, 2013. The design remained similar to the original MOGA Pro. The main difference was the added built-in phone charger.

Entering into the iOS market, PowerA released the MOGA Ace on December 6, 2014. It featured an all new design. It expands from the middle, allowing for select iDevices to be placed in the center, with controls on each side. Like the other recent models, it allows the device to charge while gaming. It is compatible with any iPhone with a lightning port.
