= Labyrinth: The Computer Game =

1986 video game

- Developer: Lucasfilm Games
- Publisher: Activision
- Designers: David Fox; Douglas Adams
- Programmer: David Fox
- Artists: Gary Winnick; Ken Macklin
- Composer: Russell Lieblich
- Platforms: Apple II, Commodore 64/128, MSX2, PC-88
- Release: NA: November 1986
- Genre: Graphic adventure
- Mode: Single-player

Labyrinth: The Computer Game is a graphic adventure game developed by Lucasfilm Games and published in 1986 by Activision. Based on the fantasy film Labyrinth, it tasks the player with navigating a maze while solving puzzles and evading dangers. The player's goal is to find and defeat the main antagonist, Jareth, within 13 real-time hours. Unlike other adventure games of the period, Labyrinth does not feature a command-line interface. Instead, the player uses two scrolling "word wheel" menus on the screen to construct basic sentences.

Labyrinth was the first adventure game created by Lucasfilm. The project was led by designer David Fox, who invented its word wheels to avoid the text parsers and syntax guessing typical of text-based adventure games. Early in development, the team collaborated with author Douglas Adams in a week-long series of brainstorming sessions, which inspired much of the final product. Labyrinth received positive reviews and, in the United States, was a bigger commercial success than the film upon which it was based. Its design influenced Lucasfilm's subsequent adventure title, the critically acclaimed Maniac Mansion.

An unrelated game based on the same movie, Labyrinth: Maō no Meikyū ("Maze of the Goblin King"), was released in Japan for the Famicom and MSX in 1987, developed by Atlus and published by Tokuma Shoten.

== Overview ==
A goblin guard corners the player character. The "word wheels" and gray "radar" bar appear in the bottom section of the screen. On the wheels, the player has combined the verb "ask" with the noun "wall", resulting in a comedic message at the top of the screen.

Labyrinth: The Computer Game is a graphic adventure game in which the player maneuvers a character through a maze while solving puzzles and evading dangers. It is an adaptation of the 1986 film Labyrinth, many of whose events and characters are reproduced in the game. However, it does not follow the plot of the film. At the beginning, the player enters their name, sex and favorite color: the last two fields determine the appearance of the player character. Afterward, a short text-based adventure sequence unfolds, wherein the player enters a movie theater to watch the film Labyrinth. The game then changes to a graphic adventure format. Jareth, the main antagonist, appears on the projection screen and transports the protagonist to a labyrinthine prison.

The player's goal is to locate and destroy Jareth within 13 real-time hours; otherwise, the protagonist will be trapped in the maze forever. While traveling the maze, the player passes through a series of scrolling hallways that contain doors, enemies and other things. A "radar" bar on the screen allows the player to see each hallway in miniature form: the locations of all doorways, items and characters in a given hallway are displayed. Unlike other adventure games of the period, Labyrinth does not feature a command-line interface. Instead of typing commands, the player selects them from two scrolling "word wheels", one for verbs and one for nouns. For example, the verb "congratulate" may be selected in one wheel, and the noun "Jareth" in the other: this inputs the command "congratulate Jareth". Based on the player's items and location, the available verbs and nouns change context-sensitively.

== Development ==
Lucasfilm Games began to design Labyrinth: The Computer Game in 1985. Company head George Lucas had requested a tie-in video game for the movie of the same name, which was under production at Lucasfilm. As was common with Lucasfilm Games projects, Lucas himself provided very little direction to the team. Labyrinth was the first licensed game developed by the company: earlier products, such as Rescue on Fractalus! and The Eidolon, had been original intellectual properties. According to project leader David Fox, working with a license "frees you up in some ways and restricts you, too". With their adaptation, the team was not pressured to reuse events and characters from the Labyrinth film, but they "felt obligated" to follow the source material. Because they saw the film as an adventure story, they chose to set their adaptation in the adventure game genre. Fox conversely disliked the genre's reliance on text parsers and syntax guessing, and so he created the word wheel menus as a replacement. They were meant to supply "a limited set of words that still let you do a lot of things", in order to streamline the game without hampering the player's freedom. The game's visual design was shared by Lucasfilm's Habitat, a massively multiplayer online game under production at the time.

Douglas really liked the word "adumbrate", meaning "to prefigure indistinctly or foreshadow", so it ended up on the verb list[.] ... You had to "adumbrate the elephant" when you were stuck in a prison, and an elephant would come and break a hole in the wall, freeing you. Definitely one of those things that was far funnier in the brainstorming session than in the game.

— David Fox on the influence of Douglas Adams

Early in development, the game's team was screened a rough cut of the film. Afterward, they were sent to London by Lucasfilm management for a one-week brainstorming session with Douglas Adams, author of The Hitchhiker's Guide to the Galaxy. Adams had worked previously with Infocom, during the development of his book's 1984 video game adaptation. Also present at the meetings were writer Christopher Cerf (a friend of the film's director, Jim Henson) and Brenda Laurel of Activision, the game's publisher. The team worked extensively with Adams during this period. Laurel later wrote: "Every day a fresh blast of his wild and intelligent humor stoked up the creativity of the team". In her view, the pinnacle of the meetings was Adams' idea for the opening sequence. He suggested a reference to The Wizard of Oz's famous transition from black-and-white to color: a transition from a text-based format to a graphical one.

Fox was given the job of taking notes during the trip. Although he had hoped for a complete design to emerge from the meetings, he returned from London with only "sheets and sheets of ideas", through which he sifted to find usable concepts. All of the material influenced the game, and many of Adams' suggestions were used. Retrospectively, Fox felt that the opening sequence was a mistake: he called it "tedious" and believed that it alienated potential fans. Labyrinth was released in 1986 for the Commodore 64, Apple II and MSX.

== Reception ==
Reception

Review scores
Publication	Score
Zzap!64	50%
Commodore User	5/5
Computer & Video Games	7/8/10/9

Commodore Magazine's Mark Cotone lauded the game's puzzle design, detailed graphics and newcomer-friendly interface. He believed that experienced players would enjoy its depth and challenging puzzles. Keith Campbell of Commodore User praised its animation and dubbed it "a superb game"—which he found unusual, given its status as a tie-in product. Nevertheless, Campbell hesitated to call it an adventure game, and he wrote that the word wheels were "rather tedious" for genre veterans. Roy Wagner of Computer Gaming World summarized Labyrinth as a "very well done [game] with an excellent user interface".

Writing for Computer & Video Games, Matthew Woodley praised the game's variety and interface. While he disliked its long loading times, he believed that they were "a small price to pay for such a brilliant game". However, Labyrinth was criticized by the three reviewers of Zzap!64. Although he praised its visuals, co-reviewer Paul Sumner called the game too slow-paced for an action title and too simplistic for an adventure. Co-reviewer Julian Rignall considered it to be boring and "a real disappointment", given Lucasfilm's strong track record.

== Legacy ==
Labyrinth was the first adventure game produced by Lucasfilm, which became a critically acclaimed and commercially successful developer in the genre. The game's technology and mechanics influenced the company's subsequent title Maniac Mansion, whose "SCUMM" engine was reused in many Lucasfilm adventure games. The word wheels were a predecessor to that game's point-and-click interface. Gary Winnick, an artist for Labyrinth, went on to lead the production of Maniac Mansion with Ron Gilbert. Fox contributed to Maniac Mansion as well, and he later directed Lucasfilm's Zak McKracken and the Alien Mindbenders. A retrospective feature by Australian video game talk show Good Game regarded Labyrinth as a solid first attempt, but as inferior to "the real classics" made afterward by Lucasfilm.
