= David Fox (game designer) =

American multimedia producer

- Occupations: Game designer and programmer
- Known for: Rescue on Fractalus! Zak McKracken; Indiana Jones and the Last Crusade
- Spouse: Annie Fox

David Fox (born 30 December 1950, in Los Angeles) is an American multimedia producer who designed and programmed numerous early LucasArts games. He and his wife, Annie Fox, now work on educational software, web design, emotional intelligence content, online communities, emerging technologies, and writing books for children and teens.

== Early work ==
Fox is based in the San Francisco Bay Area. At age eleven, he made his first 8 mm cartoon using stacks of discarded Flintstones cels he found in the trash bins behind Hanna-Barbera. He studied engineering at UCLA and Humanistic Psychology at Sonoma State University, where he received his bachelor's degree. Fox and his wife Annie co-founded Marin Computer Center in 1977 - the world's first public-access microcomputer center. He co-authored the books Computer Animation Primer, Armchair BASIC, and Pascal Primer.

== LucasArts ==
His books led to him being hired as a founding member of the Games Division at Lucasfilm (later renamed LucasArts). Over the next ten years, he was the designer, project leader, and one of the programmers for the games Rescue on Fractalus! (Fox originally proposed the project as a Star Wars game titled 'Rebel Rescue' in a 1982 memorandum.), Labyrinth, Zak McKracken and the Alien Mindbenders and Indiana Jones and the Last Crusade: The Graphic Adventure. He also worked on Maniac Mansion as the primary script programmer. Fox was part of the memorable team that included Ron Gilbert and Noah Falstein.

He spent his last two years at LucasArts as Manager of Entertainment Software on Mirage (a collaboration between LucasArts and Hughes Aircraft Corporation). This multi-player, networked location-based entertainment system was intended for theme parks, but like several early Lucasfilm projects of the time, was too advanced and hence too expensive for the market at that time.

== Talk City ==
After leaving LucasArts, Fox was a Senior Game Designer at Rocket Science Games, then worked as a freelance consultant on several games. In 1996, he joined LiveWorld Inc./Talk City, an Internet community provider, as their Director of Kids and Entertainment Programming. During his four years at the company, he produced The InSite, a website for teen empowerment, and then became the Director of New Content.

In 2001, he returned to immersive gaming at Xulu Entertainment, producing their motion simulator project. He produced and designed a prototype of an educational game for Learning Friends under a grant from the William and Flora Hewlett Foundation.

== Recent and current work ==
In the run-up to the 2004 Democratic primaries, Fox was active on Howard Dean's Media Team (responsible for Switch2Dean.com) and built a blog for Simon & Schuster on Dean's book, Winning Back America.

Since then, Fox has developed websites for authors David McCullough and Terry Gamble, Alaska Federation of Natives and Marin Democrats, all with graphic designer Daniel Will-Harris.

From 2005 to 2011, he was the Director of Production for NewsTrust, a citizen news rating service aiming to bring together experienced journalists and volunteer reviewers.

He currently designs apps for the iTunes App Store. His most recent game is Rube Works: The Official Rube Goldberg Invention Game, the first Rube Goldberg game authorized by The Heirs of Rube Goldberg.

Fox, along with Ron Gilbert and Gary Winnick, was involved in the programming, scripting and writing of the adventure game Thimbleweed Park, which was released in March 2017.

In 2022, Fox was the lead gameplay programmer on Return to Monkey Island, the sixth installment of the Monkey Island franchise.

== LucasArts and Scumm ==
- LucasArts adventure games
- SCUMM
- ScummVM

== Games ==
Year	Title	Developer
1984	Rescue on Fractalus!	Lucasfilm Games
1986	Labyrinth: The Computer Game	Lucasfilm Games
1987	Maniac Mansion	Lucasfilm Games
1988	Zak McKracken and the Alien Mindbenders	Lucasfilm Games
1989	Indiana Jones and the Last Crusade: The Graphic Adventure	Lucasfilm Games
1989	Pipe Dream	The Assembly Line
1994	Cadillacs and Dinosaurs: The Second Cataclysm	Rocket Science Games
2014	Rube Works: The Official Rube Goldberg Invention Game	Electric Eggplant
2017	Thimbleweed Park	Terrible Toybox
2020	Delores A Thimbleweed Park Mini-Adventure	Terrible Toybox
2022	Return to Monkey Island	Terrible Toybox
