= Loom (video game) =

1990 video game

- Cover art by Mark Ferrari
- Developers: Lucasfilm Games; Realtime Associates (TG-CD)
- Publishers: Lucasfilm Games; Turbo Technologies (TG-CD)
- Director: Jennifer Sward
- Producer: Greg Hammond
- Designer: Brian Moriarty
- Programmers: Peter Lincroft; Kalani Streicher
- Artists: Mark Ferrari; Gary Winnick; Steve Purcell; Ken Macklin
- Writers: Brian Moriarty; Jennifer Sward; Sara Reeder
- Composers: George Sanger; Eric Hammond; Themes: Pyotr Ilyich Tchaikovsky
- Engine: SCUMM
- Platforms: MS-DOS, Amiga, Atari ST, Mac OS, FM Towns, TurboGrafx-CD
- Release: January 1990: MS-DOS; NA: January 1990; EU: 1990; NA: 1992 (VGA); EU: 1992 (VGA); Amiga/Atari ST; NA: March 1990; EU: 1990; Mac OS; NA: 1990; FM Towns; JP: April 1991; TurboGrafx-CD; JP: September 25, 1992; NA: 1992
- Genre: Graphic adventure
- Mode: Single-player

Loom is a 1990 fantasy-themed graphic adventure game developed and published by Lucasfilm Games for MS-DOS. The project was led by Brian Moriarty, a former Infocom employee and author of classic text adventures Wishbringer (1985), Trinity (1986), and Beyond Zork (1987). It was the fourth game to use the SCUMM adventure game engine, and the first of those to avoid the verb–object interface introduced in Maniac Mansion.

== Gameplay ==
A departure from other Lucasfilm adventure games in many senses, Loom is based on a serious and complex fantasy story. With its experimental interface, it eschewed the traditional paradigm of graphical adventures, where puzzles usually involve interactions between the game character, the environment, and items the character has in their possession.

Loom's gameplay centers instead around magical four-note tunes known as "drafts" that the protagonist, Bobbin Threadbare, can play on his distaff. Each draft is a spell that has an effect of a certain type, such as "Opening" or "Night Vision". Some drafts can be reversed by playing their notes backwards, so the "Dye" draft played backwards becomes "Bleach", while others, such as the "Terror" draft, are palindromes (e.g. C–E–E–C) and so cannot be reversed in this manner.

An early scene from the game showing the distaff in the lower left and a selected object (the Great Loom) in the lower right.

Bobbin can learn drafts by observing an object that possesses the qualities of the desired draft; for example, by examining a blade while it is being sharpened, Bobbin can learn the "Sharpening" draft. When the game begins, Bobbin is only able to play drafts using the notes C, D and E, limiting his ability to reproduce more powerful drafts. As the game progresses and additional notes become available, so his ability to play new drafts increases.

The game can be played at three difficulty levels, each differing in how clearly the notes being played are labeled. For example, the "Standard" level indicates the notes on a scale below the distaff, while the "Expert" level shows no notes and must be played by ear. In the original release, expert players are rewarded with a cutscene that does not appear for the other two difficulties. The later CD-ROM release, however, shows an abridged version of this scene to all players.

== Story ==
=== Prologue ===
It was long after the passing of the second shadow, when dragons ruled the twilight sky, and the stars were bright and numerous ...

— Clothos, Loom: The Audio Drama

The events of the game are preceded by a 30-minute audio drama. It is established that the Age of the Great Guilds arose when humans once again tried to establish dominion over nature. The world of Loom is not defined in relation to ours, but the game takes place in the year 8021, raising the possibility it is set on Earth in a distant future.

People banded together to form city-states of a common trade "devoted to the absolute control of knowledge, held together by stern traditions of pride, and of fear". The humble guild of Weavers established themselves as masters of woven fabric, though they eventually transcended the limits of cloth and began to weave "subtle patterns of influence into the very fabric of reality". They were persecuted for these acts of "witchcraft", and purchased an island far off the mainland coast, which they called Loom, after the great loom that was the symbol of their guild.

Lady Cygna Threadbare is introduced as a bereaved mother who begs the Elders of the Guild of Weavers to use the power of the Loom to end the suffering of the Weavers. Their numbers are failing and their seed is barren. The Elders Atropos, Clothos, and Lachesis, who are named after Greek mythology's three Fates, reprimand Cygna, telling her that it is not their place to play gods.

Cygna, despite their warnings, secretly assumes control of the Loom and plants one gray thread. She inadvertently draws an (unforeseen) infant out of the Loom, incurring the wrath of the Elders. She surrenders the child to Dame Hetchel, the old serving woman, and accepts her fate. The Elders cast the "Transcendence" draft on her, transforming her into a swan and banishing her from the pattern (the name Cygna is the feminine form of swan in Latin). Hetchel names the child Bobbin, and cares for him as her own.

Bobbin grows up ostracized from the rest of the Guild. The Elders note that the presence of his gray thread has thrown the pattern into chaos, and the Loom foresees the very unraveling of the pattern. For these reasons, the Elders ban him from learning the ways of the Guild until a decision can be made on Bobbin's seventeenth birthday ("until his coming of age seventeen years hence", as it is described in the game's audio drama). Hetchel, however, defies the Elders and secretly teaches him a few basics of weaving. This is where the game begins.

=== Plot ===
On his birthday, Bobbin is summoned by the Elders in order to determine his fate. He arrives at the Sanctuary in time to witness the Elders punish Hetchel with the "Transcendence" draft for educating Bobbin, but Hetchel reverts to a swan's egg, which puzzles and frightens the Elders. As they contemplate this turn of events a swan comes down from the sky and crashes through a window in the Sanctuary. She casts the "Transcendence" draft on the Elders, as well as the rest of the villagers, transforming all the Weavers except Bobbin into swans who leave through a rift in the sky. Bobbin, who is left all alone, finds Elder Atropos' distaff, and uses it to free Hetchel from her egg.

Hetchel, who is now a cygnet, tells Bobbin that the swan who visits him every year on his birthday came to save the Weavers from the Third Shadow that is about to cover the world. Bobbin then moves on to find the flock. On his way, he meets other guilds and has several adventures. Eventually, he encounters a Cleric, Bishop Mandible, who is after the Scrying Sphere of the Glassmakers, the swords of the Blacksmiths, and the products of the Shepherds. Mandible claims the Weaver's distaff to rule the world with an army of the undead, thus fulfilling the prophecies. By playing the draft of "Opening" on a nearby graveyard, he tears the fabric of the universe apart and allows an entity called "Chaos" to enter. Chaos kills Mandible and summons an army of undead to destroy the earth. Bobbin reclaims the distaff from the dead Bishop and heals many of the tears in the pattern, along the way helping many of his previous acquaintances, who were hurt or killed by Chaos's army. Finally, he battles Chaos, who is striving to take control of the great Loom on his native island. The battle ends as Chaos kills his stepmother using the draft of "Unmaking". It is hinted, however, that it is still possible to save Hetchel, as "one feather still remained intact".

Bobbin then destroys the great Loom using the same draft. He is joined by his mother and the other Weavers and is told that one half of the world will be ruled by Chaos while the Weavers will stay in the other half, and that with time, they may gain enough power to challenge Chaos again. Bobbin casts "Transcendence" upon himself, and with the aid of his mother and the other villagers in their swan forms, he flies away, carrying the ripple across the world. His friends watch the flock of the swans fly away; it remains unclear whether Bobbin has left them in Chaos' realm or has saved them.

== Development ==
=== Music ===
The in-game music consists of excerpts from the Swan Lake ballet by Tchaikovsky and Ricardo Drigo, arranged for MIDI by George "The Fat Man" Sanger. While supporting basic PC speaker sound and AdLib, the EGA version originally lacked built-in Roland MT-32 support. A form included in the package could be mailed to Lucasfilm Games as an order for an extra game disk providing MT-32 support which was later also released as a downloadable patch. This disk also came with an additional overture which was played prior to the opening cutscene.

=== Package contents ===
The original package offered an audio tape with a 30-minute audio drama that explained the nature and history of the world of Loom, and the circumstances of Bobbin's birth. The game is a direct continuation of the story. The drama was enriched by original music composed by Jerry Gerber. Side A of the tape was encoded for standard Dolby-B playback; side B was labelled "game music" and had a composition of the game's soundtrack. In other releases of the game, side B had the identical program with side A encoded for Dolby-S. It was the first commercial cassette to employ Dolby-S noise reduction.

The package also offered an illustrated notebook, The Book of Patterns, supposedly belonging to apprentice weavers in the game world. Its purpose was to optionally note there the drafts that could be learned, as well as describing some that were not seen in the game, with interesting tales related to each draft. Each description also included a staff and four spaces in which to record the four respective notes of the draft. The book contained a warning saying that wise spellweavers write in pencil; this is because many of the spells in the game have randomized threads (musical notes). In the original disk versions, it also acted as a form of copy protection; the game would ask players for the notes of a particular draft in the book at start-up. If the player doesn't enter the correct notes, the game would exit back to the operating system (in the PC version, it would enter demo mode).

=== Orson Scott Card ===
A common misconception about Loom is that author Orson Scott Card contributed to its original development, based on his name appearing in the credits. Card mentions in a review for Loom that this is untrue, and that Moriarty included his name in the credits due to some very minor feedback he had provided prior to the game's release. Card's association with Lucasfilm continued, however, leading to more significant contributions to The Secret of Monkey Island, Loom's 1992 "talkie" release, and The Dig (1995).

== Release history ==
Loom was originally published for MS-DOS on floppy disk with 16-color EGA graphics in May 1990. This version was soon after released on the Amiga, the Atari ST, and Macintosh.

=== FM Towns ===
Loom was redeveloped for the Japanese FM Towns computer and released on CD-ROM in 1991 with enhanced 256-color VGA graphics and a new digital soundtrack. The dialogue and story elements remained largely unchanged from the original version, though at least one scene was partially censored of blood, and some elements of the visual design were lost. A similar version was released for the TurboGrafx-CD in 1992, but featured a mix of visuals from the 16- and 256-color versions, adapted to that system's color palette.

=== Talkie ===
Bobbin standing before the Great Loom in the 1992 CD release.

The final version of Loom was released for DOS on CD in 1992. It featured an entirely re-recorded digital soundtrack, a separate CD for the audio drama, and fully voiced dialogue, with many of the actors reprising their roles from the audio drama. However, due to the technical constraints on how much uncompressed audio could fit on a CD, much of the original dialogue had to be revised or abridged. Orson Scott Card assisted with the dialogue revision.

The graphics were a continuation of those used in the FM Towns version but with some minor enhancements and additional censorship. Some features were also cut from the FM Towns version, such as multiple solutions to puzzles, many conversation close-ups, and parts of cutscenes. Brian Moriarty has stated that he believes the FM Towns version to be the best 256-color version of Loom.

=== Availability ===
Due to a licensing agreement with (now defunct) Mindscape, the DOS CD-ROM version became commercially unavailable, and until 2006, the DOS floppy-disk version was the only one purchasable from LucasArts. All of these versions of Loom can now be played on a variety of different platforms using the ScummVM virtual machine.

The PC CD-ROM version of Loom was released through the Steam digital distribution platform for Windows on July 8, 2009, with Mac support following on May 12, 2010.

== Reception ==
According to Rogue Leaders: The Story of LucasArts, Loom was a critical success, but "failed to sell in sufficient numbers to warrant sequels".

Orson Scott Card praised Loom, writing in Compute! that it was "like nothing you've ever seen (or done) before ... a work of storytelling art," and cited the game's flexibility in adapting to playstyles, whether using action or puzzles. Dragon gave the game 5 out of 5 stars. Scorpia of Computer Gaming World approved of the game's graphics and gameplay, but said that "as an adventure game, it is just too lightweight." She stated that the game was impossible to fail, with very easy puzzles, but that the linear gameplay resulted in no freedom of movement. While praising the story, Scorpia wished that Lucasfilm would have given it an "epic treatment" instead of Loom's simplicity. In April 1994 the magazine described the CD version as "Brian Moriarty's beautifully spun tale ... Though a few years old, Loom's unique music-oriented interface, strong story-telling, and incredible graphics still stand up to more current adventure games". Although "too short", the magazine recommended Loom to "the new computer gamer".

Strategy Plus's Theo Clark wrote that Loom's "story is absorbing and exciting, and there is plenty of pleasure to be gained from encounters and from discovering the effects of the various spells." He noted that players might consider it a "fatal flaw" that Bobbin cannot die, and that "any puzzle can be resolved by clicking on all of the available items and running through all of the known drafts". However, he argued that the game is "a rare treat" for players who see it as "a long, interactive video" rather than an adventure game.

Computer Gaming World gave Loom a Special Award for Artistic Achievement as part of the magazine's Game of the Year Awards, stating that its colors, "mesmerizing special effects", soundtrack, and user interface combined to make Loom "a work of art." It also was nominated for the magazine's "Adventure Game of the Year" prize, which ultimately went to Hero's Quest. The editors called Loom "an intense entertainment experience ... true to an original philosophical vision of its author in both story and presentation".

In 1996, Computer Gaming World declared Loom the 81st-best computer game ever released. In 2011, Adventure Gamers named Loom the 61st-best adventure game ever released.

== Legacy ==
=== Sequels ===
According to Rogue Leaders, Loom was not designed to be the first game in a series, but "Brian Moriarty considered additional directions for the story" after development of the first entry had concluded. The two sequels planned were titled Forge and The Fold, starring Bobbin's friends Rusty Nailbender and Fleece Firmflanks. Moriarty gave an account of potential sequels in a 2006 interview:

Loom wasn't actually written with a trilogy in mind. But after it was finished, there was vague interest in continuing the story. In discussing this possibility, I imagined two sequels.

The first was tentatively called Forge. It tells the story of Bobbin's friend Rusty Nailbender, whose home city (the Forge of the Blacksmiths) was enslaved by Chaos near the end of Loom. Rusty becomes the leader of an underground movement to overthrow Chaos, together with Fleece Firmflanks of the Shepherds and new characters from the other Guilds. Bobbin appears every now and then as a ghostly swan dispensing mystical advice, an obvious nod to Obi-Wan Kenobi of Star Wars. The story climaxes in a terrible battle that nearly destroys the world.

The third game, The Fold, is about Fleece Firmflanks and her attempt to unite the shattered Guilds in a final, desperate effort to banish Chaos. Near the end of the game, when the cause appears hopeless, Bobbin and the Weavers swoop in like the proverbial cavalry to save the day. The Loom of the Weavers is remade, reality is healed, and peace is restored to the Guilds.

But this was all just talk. I was busy with other projects, and nobody else felt strongly enough about the games to make a commitment. So Forge and The Fold never got made.

=== Appearance in other media ===
"Cobb" seen advertising Loom in The Secret of Monkey Island (1990).

As was typical for LucasArts, several other games referenced the Loom characters and storyline. A likeness of Bishop Mandible's assistant Cob, spelled "Cobb" with an additional B, can be found inside the Scumm Bar in The Secret of Monkey Island (1990), dressed as a pirate with a badge on his shirt that says "Ask me about Loom", and will happily divulge marketing information when so asked. Cobb the pirate reappears Return to Monkey Island (2022), but has grown weary of people asking him about Loom over the years, and only does so again after much prodding. In the "Legend of Monkey Island" expansion for Sea of Thieves (2018), Cobb can once again be found at the Scumm Bar, and will repeat his speech about Loom if prompted.

Monkey Island's protagonist, Guybrush Threepwood, can say "I'm Bobbin. Are you my mother?" on a number of occasions throughout the series, and in The Curse of Monkey Island (1997) can quip about Bobbin's relative obscurity. Monkey Island, Monkey Island 2 (1991), and Day of the Tentacle (1993) all include a credit for their respective seagulls as "Seagull appears courtesy of LOOM™".

The player can kill the Loom seagull in the 1995 LucasArts game Full Throttle as well as its 2017 remake. A wooden statue in tribute to the "Looming Seagulls" can be found at the Scumm Bar in Return to Monkey Island.

In the 256-color remake of Indiana Jones and the Last Crusade: The Graphic Adventure, a landscape painting in the vault of Brunwald Castle features a scene from Loom. The NES version of Maniac Mansion, released in September 1990, features a broken record titled The Soundtrack of Loom.

Space Quest IV, a game released the following year by Sierra On-Line, makes light of Loom's criticisms by featuring a description of a video game named "BOOM" in the game's Radio Shock store: "The latest bomb from master storyteller Morrie Brianarty, BOOM is a post-holocaust adventure set in post-holocaust America after the holocaust. Neutron bombs have eradicated all life, leaving only YOU to wander through the wreckage. No other characters, no conflict, no puzzles, no chance of dying, and no interface make this the easiest-to-finish game yet! Just boot it up and watch it explode!"
