= Defenders of Dynatron City =

1992 video game

- Developer: Lucasfilm Games
- Publisher: JVC Musical Industries
- Designer: Gary Winnick
- Composers: George Sanger; David Warhol
- Platform: NES
- Release: NA: July 1992
- Genre: Action
- Mode: Single-player

Defenders of Dynatron City is a video game released for the Nintendo Entertainment System by JVC Musical Industries and Lucasfilm Games (later, LucasArts) in August 1992. This was Gary Winnick's first project as sole designer after co-designing Maniac Mansion with Ron Gilbert. It was supported by a brief media franchise consisting of an animated TV pilot and a six-issue comic book series.

== Video game ==
The game centers on a team of superheroes who protect a futuristic metropolis from Dr. Mayhem and his robotic henchmen. The Defenders are:

- Ms. Megawatt (voiced by Whoopi Goldberg in the animated special), who can generate electrical energies.
- Jet Headstrong (voiced by Pat Fraley in the animated special), who can fire his head like a rocket.
- Buzzsaw Girl (voiced by Candi Milo in the animated special), who has a buzzsaw blade instead of legs and feet.
- Toolbox (voiced by David Coburn in the animated special), a robot with a smashing hammer head and a litany of useful tool options he can use in combat.
- Monkey Kid (voiced by Brian Stokes Mitchell in the animated special), a blue monkey armed with exploding bananas and leader of the team.
- Radium Dog, who can fly and has jaws strong enough to pick up cars with his mouth.

=== Critical response ===
The game won praise in its preproduction by many video game magazines for the creation of an original superhero team, but when the game was released it was widely panned by video game critics for, among other things, having a notoriously poor hit detection that required extremely precise aim for attacks to hit enemies.

== TV special ==
The animated pilot was produced by DIC Animation City and was aired on the Fox Kids block on February 22, 1992. It featured the voices of Whoopi Goldberg and Tim Curry. Originally, Doctor Mayhem was voiced by Christopher Walken. Steve Purcell recalled that the producers at the last minute replaced him with a more cartooney voice. It failed to be picked up as a series, but was subsequently released on VHS. No official DVD or digital download release has been announced as of yet.

== Comics ==
The comic book adaptation was published Marvel Comics. Written by Steve Purcell and penciled by Frank Cirocco, it ran for six monthly issues, dated from February through July 1992.

== Reception ==
Reception

Review scores
Publication	Score
Electronic Gaming Monthly	4/10, 4/10, 3/10, 3/10
GamePro	12.5/20
Nintendo Power	11.3/20
Total!	37%
VideoGames & Computer Entertainment	6/10
N-Force	39%

Three of the four reviewers in Electronic Gaming Monthly said that Defenders of Dynatron City had little unique or new features that were present in the best action games. One reviewer in the magazine summarized that "if this cart were released 3 years ago, it would have been considered substandard."
