= House of Dust =

House of Dust may refer to:

- A House of Dust, a 1967 generative poem by Alison Knowles and James Tenney
- House of Dust (architecture), a 2013 architecture project in Rome by Antonino Cardillo
- House of Dust (film), a 2014 supernatural thriller directed by A.D. Calvo
