= Truthdig =

American alternative news website

- Website type: News commentary alternative media investigative editorials
- Available in: English
- Headquarters: United States
- Founders: Zuade Kaufman; Robert Scheer
- CEO: Zuade Kaufman
- Website: truthdig.com
- Commercial: Yes
- Registration: Optional
- Launched: 2005
- Current status: Active

Truthdig is an American progressive alternative news website that publishes a mix of long-form investigative reporting, interviews, art criticism, and commentary on current events. It was founded in 2005 by publisher and CEO Zuade Kaufman and editor-in-chief Robert Scheer. After a publishing hiatus that started in March 2020, Truthdig relaunched on November 1, 2022, with Kaufman continuing as publisher and CEO. The site focuses on major "Digs" that purport to look beneath headlines to reveal facts overlooked or not reported by mainstream media.

== History ==
Kaufman began her journalism career at KCET in Los Angeles, initially working on documentaries before transitioning to print journalism. She collaborated with Scheer on hyperlocal editions at the Los Angeles Times, Westside, Weekly, and Our Times, starting as a researcher and then as a staff reporter. After the newspaper changed ownership and eliminated these local editions, Kaufman pursued a master's degree in journalism at the USC Annenberg School for Communication and Journalism. She began developing Truthdig while at USC, and it launched immediately after Scheer was fired from the Los Angeles Times.

In 2014, Truthdig launched "Global Voices: Truthdig Women Reporting" in collaboration with the International Women’s Media Foundation.

On March 11, 2020, nine Truthdig employees announced a work stoppage to protest against what they described as "unfair labor conditions and the effort by the publisher, Zuade Kaufman, to remove the site's founding editor-in-chief and co-owner Robert Scheer". Later that month, Truthdig employees received emails which informed them about being laid off. According to the full statement, 15 employees were to be affected. On March 27, 2020 Kaufman responded in an open letter that attributed the matter to "negotiations to end the business partnership" between her and Scheer. As a result, new publications were suspended and "Truthdig" went on hiatus, while its journalistic archives remained accessible to the public online.

Truthdig relaunched on November 1, 2022 without Scheer's involvement and with Kaufman continuing as publisher and CEO. They continued with editorial "Digs", journalistic investigations, and "Global Voices: Truthdig Women Reporting".

== Contributors ==
Significant contributors to Truthdig have included Bill Blum, Noam Chomsky, Juan Cole, Mark Fiore, Amy Goodman, Sam Harris, Chris Hedges, Jim Knipfel, Kamin Mohammadi, Greg Palast, Carrie Rickey, Émile P. Torres, Gore Vidal, Eli Valley, and Alexander Zaitchik.

In October 2006, Truthdig published an essay entitled "After Pat's Birthday" about the death of the NFL player and American soldier Pat Tillman that was written by his brother Kevin. The essay was widely distributed and was cited in The New York Times and the Associated Press.

== Reception and awards ==
Truthdig has been used as a data source in communication studies research on systematic differences in coverage of political events by alternative media versus mainstream media. In 2015, an Association for Computing Machinery conference paper determined that users of the NewsTrust website considered Truthdig a "most trusted" political news source with a "left" viewpoint.

Over the years, Truthdig has received numerous awards in the areas of journalistic reporting, commentary, and criticism. This includes first-place awards from the Webby Awards, the Society of Professional Journalists Sigma Delta Chi Awards, the EPPY Awards, and the Los Angeles Press Club. At the 2010 ceremony for the Webby Awards, which traditionally limit acceptance speeches to five words, Robert Scheer accepted on behalf of Truthdig, saying: "Wall Street—what fucking thieves."

== See also ==
- Independent media
- Watchdog journalism
