= Gary Winnick (game developer) =

American video game designer

- Occupations: Game designer, writer, artist, animator
- Years active: 1974–present

Gary Winnick is an American computer game designer, writer, artist, and animator who was the first artist hired by Lucasfilm Games. He co-designed Maniac Mansion, alongside Ron Gilbert, and created the comic book Bad Dreams.

== Career ==
Gary Winnick founded Horizon Zero Graphiques with Frank Cirocco in 1974. There, he was the editor, artist, and writer for the comic magazine Venture, which ran until 1976. Horizon Zero Graphiques also published the comic magazine Mindworks by Brent Anderson, which included art by Gary. He began his video game career at LucasArts as the only artist and animator at the then-newly formed Lucasfilm Games Division in 1984. He worked as an artist and animator on the early games by Lucasfilm Games, before he became co-designer of the 1987 adventure game, Maniac Mansion. He continued working on art and animation at LucasArts, and became the art department supervisor on Indiana Jones and the Last Crusade: The Graphic Adventure in 1989. In 1992, he was the designer, artist, and animator on Defenders of Dynatron City and co-wrote the comic based on the game, with Steve Purcell. Before leaving LucasArts in 1993, he contributed dialog and story to the sequel to Maniac Mansion, Day of the Tentacle. After leaving LucasArts, he joined Spectrum Holobyte as an art director. In 1995, he co-founded the video game company, Orbital Studios, where he served as executive producer. In 1996, he returned as a partner at Horizon Zero Graphiques, which was rebranded Lightsource Studios.

He also co-created the comic book Neomen with Frank Cirocco in 1987 and created the comic book Bad Dreams in 2014. The first issue of Bad Dreams was in the list of the top six new comics and sold out in its first week of release.

Gary Winnick reunited with Ron Gilbert, with whom he co-created his early critically acclaimed point'n'click games for LucasArts, and both of them ran a Kickstarter campaign for a new point'n'click game called Thimbleweed Park. The campaign ended on December 18, 2014 and the game was released on March 30, 2017.

== Credited works ==
=== Bibliography ===
- 1974 Mindworks, artist
- 1974 Venture, editor, writer, artist
- 1987 Neomen, writer, artist
- 1992 Defenders of Dynatron City
- 2014 Bad Dreams, writer, artist

=== Games ===
- 1985 Rescue on Fractalus!, animator (LucasArts)
- 1985 Ballblazer, artist (LucasArts)
- 1985 The Eidolon, artist, animator (LucasArts)
- 1985 Koronis Rift, additional art (LucasArts)
- 1986 Habitat, artist, animator (LucasArts)
- 1986 Labyrinth: The Computer Game, artist, animator (LucasArts)
- 1986 PHM Pegasus, artist (LucasArts)
- 1987 Maniac Mansion, co-project leader, artist, animator (LucasArts)
- 1988 Zak McKracken and the Alien Mindbenders, artist (LucasArts)
- 1989 Pipe Dream, artist (LucasArts)
- 1989 Indiana Jones and the Last Crusade: The Graphic Adventure, art department supervisor (LucasArts)
- 1990 Loom, character designer, artist, animator (LucasArts)
- 1990 The Secret of Monkey Island, art department supervisor (LucasArts)
- 1991 Star Wars, artist (Beam Software)
- 1991 Monkey Island 2: LeChuck's Revenge, art department supervisor (LucasArts)
- 1992 Defenders of Dynatron City, project leader, artist, animator (LucasArts)
- 1992 Indiana Jones and the Fate of Atlantis, art department supervisor (LucasArts)
- 1993 Day of the Tentacle, writer (LucasArts)
- 1993 National Lampoon's Chess Maniac 5 Billion and 1, art director (Spectrum Holobyte)
- 1995 Star Trek: The Next Generation: A Final Unity, art director (Spectrum Holobyte)
- 1995 Dinonauts: Animated Adventures in Space, designer, artist, executive producer (Orbital Studios)
- 2007 Meet the Robinsons (Nintendo DS), project manager for cutscene animations (Lightsource Studios)
- 2008 Bolt (Nintendo DS), project manager for cutscene animations (Lightsource Studios)
- 2017 Thimbleweed Park, writer, designer, artist
