= Zak McKracken and the Alien Mindbenders =

1988 video game

- Cover art by Steve Purcell
- Developer: Lucasfilm Games
- Publishers: NA: Lucasfilm Games; EU: U.S. Gold
- Director: David Fox
- Designers: David Fox; Matthew Alan Kane; David Spangler
- Artists: Martin Cameron; Gary Winnick; Enhanced versions: Mark Ferrari; Basilo Amaro
- Writers: David Fox; Matthew Alan Kane
- Composers: Matthew Alan Kane; Chris Grigg (C64)
- Engine: SCUMM
- Platforms: Commodore 64, MS-DOS, Amiga, Atari ST, FM Towns
- Release: October 1988: C64, MS-DOS; NA: 1988 Amiga, ST; NA: 1989; Enhanced MS-DOS; NA: 1989 FM Towns; JP: 1990
- Genre: Graphic adventure

Zak McKracken and the Alien Mindbenders is a graphic adventure game by Lucasfilm Games released in 1988 for the Commodore 64 and MS-DOS, then for the Amiga and Atari ST in 1989. It was the second game to use the SCUMM engine, after Maniac Mansion. The project was led by David Fox, with Matthew Alan Kane as the co-designer and co-programmer.

== Plot ==
The story is set in 1997, nine years after the game's production. The plot follows Zak, a writer for the National Inquisitor, a tabloid newspaper; Annie Larris, a freelance scientist; and Melissa China and Leslie Bennett, two Yale University students, in their attempt to prevent the nefarious alien Caponians (who have taken over "The Phone Company", an amalgamation of various telecommunication companies around the world) from slowly reducing the intelligence of everybody on Earth by emitting a 60 Hz "hum" from their "Mind Bending Machine". The Skolarians, another ancient alien race, have left a defense mechanism hanging around to repulse the Caponians (the "Skolarian Device"), which needs reassembly and start-up, but the parts are spread all over Earth and Mars.

== Development ==
Zak McKracken and the Alien Mindbenders was developed and published by Lucasfilm Games. It was the second game to use the SCUMM engine, after Maniac Mansion. David Fox later noted that the game's scope required major updates to the SCUMM engine and faced severe technical constraints on the Atari 8-bit computers, where the team had to optimize the code to fit within 48KB of RAM. Like Maniac Mansion, Zak McKracken was initially developed for the Commodore 64 and ported later to other systems. The project was led by David Fox, with Matthew Alan Kane as the co-designer and co-programmer. Fox consulted with New Age writer David Spangler for the game materials. The game was originally meant to be more serious, resembling the Indiana Jones series, but Ron Gilbert persuaded David Fox to increase the humorous aspects of the game. The game was consequently heavily inspired by many popular theories about aliens, ancient astronauts, and mysterious civilizations. The many places visited in the game are common hotspots for these ideas, such as the pyramids of Egypt and Mexico, Lima, Stonehenge, the Bermuda Triangle, and the Face on Mars. The Skolarians are based on the Greys alien, while the Caponians (a name derived from "Al Capone") are primarily based on the Men in Black, with their Cadillac-shaped spaceship and Elvis-themed leader (nicknamed "The King"). The Caponians also have heads shaped like Easter Island's Moai statues. Fox aimed to blend his authentic interest in New Age concepts with "pseudo-science" elements, intentionally using a humorous lens to create the game's unique narrative atmosphere.

== Release ==
Zak McKracken was originally released in October 1988, for the C64, self-published by Lucasfilm Games. A port to MS-DOS was published the same year, followed by a version with Enhanced Graphics Adapter support in 1989. Amiga and Atari ST ports were also released in 1989.

The Japanese version of the game was released in 1990 under the title Zak McKracken (Japanese: ザックマックラッケン Zakkumakkurakken); for the Japanese Fujitsu FM Towns computer. Produced by Douglas Crockford, it came on CD-ROM with 256-color graphics and a remastered sampled audio soundtrack. It is playable in both English and Japanese. When this version is played in Japanese, the sprites' eyes are replaced with anime eyes. The box art was redrawn for the Japanese market by artist Yuzuki Hikaru (弓月光), otherwise known as Nishimura Tsukasa (西村司).

=== Re-release ===
In March 2015, Zak McKracken was re-released on the digital distribution platform GOG.com after years of commercial non-availability. The GOG.com release marked the first time the 256-color version of the game had been made officially available outside Japan.

== Reception ==
Discussing Zak McKracken's commercial performance, David Fox later wrote, "I think Zak was far more popular in Germany and Europe than in the States. I'm not sure why ... maybe my humor was more European in nature?"

Many reviews, both online and in print, rate Zak McKracken as among the best adventure games ever made, but others disagree. Charles Ardai in Computer Gaming World described Zak McKracken as a good game, but said that it could have been better. He described the game's central flaw in the game's environments, limited to a relatively small number of screens per location, giving each town a movie-set feel compared to the size and detail of Maniac Mansion. PC Computing wrote that Zak McKracken for the PC had a clever story but "grade B animation", concluding that "the result falls short of the magic we expect from George Lucas". Compute! favorably reviewed Zak McKracken, but wished that Lucasfilm would next produce a game that did not depend on jokes and puzzles to tell its story. The large number of mazes in the game was also a source of criticism, but David Fox felt it was the best way to maximize the game's size and still have it fit on two Commodore 64 floppy disks. Other critics complained about the need to enter copy protection codes not once, but multiple times whenever the player flew out of the US.

In Issue 12 of Gateways, Charles and Sydney Barouch listed the few items that the player collects, and then asked "But what will you do with all these things? That's where the fun comes in." They concluded, "If you play your cards right, you might even save the world from the Stupidity Epidemic.".

The game was reviewed in 1989 in Dragon No. 142 by Hartley, Patricia, and Kirk Lesser in "The Role of Computers" column. The reviewers gave the game 3 1/2 out of 5 stars.

The game received high scores in general press. It received 90 out of 100 in several reviews, such as of Zzap!, Power Play, Happy Computer, HonestGamers, Pixel-Heroes.de, Jeuxvideo.com, ST Action, and Quandary magazines.

== Legacy ==
The title of the Teenage Mutant Ninja Turtles episode "Zach and the Alien Invaders" pays homage to this game's title. Architect Antonino Cardillo spoke about the influences that the game Zak McKracken had on his work House of Dust during a lecture held at Cinecittà Studios in the context of the Rome Video Game Lab 2019 festival.

=== Fan sequels ===
Some Zak McKracken fans have created and released their own sequels, so called fangames, among which:

- The New Adventures of Zak McKracken, released in March 2002 by "LucasFan Games" and containing graphics from the Japanese FM Towns 256 color version and country-specific backgrounds from various Neo-Geo games. The original release was notorious for containing an adult ending, but the ending was soon changed when the developers were told that the female characters were based on actual persons. This sequel is short and fairly limited compared to the two other fan sequels.
- Zak McKracken: Between Time and Space was released in German in April 2008 and re-released as a director's cut in German, English and French (subtitles) in May 2015 by "Artificial Hair Bros.". The game consists of hand-drawn 2D scenes and sprites and pre-rendered 3D videos. It uses the Visionaire Studio engine that professional developers like Daedalic use.

Other notable but unreleased fan sequels include:

- Zak McKracken and the Alien Rockstars, which was planned for a final release in 2007 following the release of a demo. After several project restarts and lead changes the project was stopped, but the game engine's source code was released on SourceForge.
- Zak McKracken and the Lonely Sea Monster was initially scheduled for July 1, 2007, but development was halted. It was intended to look "like the original game, with the same kind of locations, and original art."
