= Bad Dreams (comics) =

- Date: 2015
- Series: Bad Dreams
- Publisher: Red 5 Comics

Creative team
- Writers: Gary Winnick
- Artists: Gary Winnick

Original publication
- Issues: 1 to 5
- Date of publication: April 30 - September 24, 2014
- Language: English

Bad Dreams is a five issue comic series by Gary Winnick, the co-creator of Maniac Mansion. Funding was initially sought through a crowdfunding campaign in 2013, but the comic was ultimately published by Red 5 Comics. The first issue was in the list of the top six new comics and sold out in its first week of release. The five issues of Bad Dreams were released as a trade paperback on June 17, 2015.
