= Specus Corallii =

Work of architecture

- Location: Trapani, Sicily
- Coordinates: 38°00′56″N 12°30′27″E
- Owner: Diocese of Trapani
- Style: Italian modern and contemporary architecture
- Architect: Antonino Cardillo

Specus Corallii (English: The Coral Cave), is an architectural work built in 2016 in Trapani, Sicily, designed by the Italian architect Antonino Cardillo.
