= Annie Fox (author) =

American book author (born 1950)

- Occupation: Author
- Spouse: David Fox

Annie Fox (born 1950) is an American book author. In addition to writing, she also is a presenter of workshops for teens, their families and educators. In workshops and online, Fox has been answering teens' questions, especially teen girls' questions for over ten years. On her online teen chat rooms at Talk City's The InSite, her username is "Hey Terra!" She is also a contributor to The Huffington Post.

== Early life and education ==
She graduated from Cornell University with a degree in Human Development and Family Studies. She then completed her master's in education from the State University of New York at Cortland and became a teacher.

== Career ==
With her husband, game programmer David Fox, she opened the world's first public access microcomputer facility (Marin Computer Center) in 1977. Her first computer-oriented book was Armchair BASIC: An Absolute Beginner's Guide to Microcomputers and Programming in BASIC (1983, Osborn/McGraw-Hill). From there she became an award-winning writer/designer of children's CD-ROMs. After her career as a children's CD-ROM designer, Fox created The InSite, a website for teens and young adults. There she wrote as "Terra" on InSite's online advice column.

Her first book was People Are Like Lollipops (1971, Holiday House). She wrote the book Can You Relate (Free Spirit Publishing, 2000). It was re-released in 2005 as The Teen Survival Guide to Dating and Relating: Real-World Advice on Guys, Girls, Growing Up, and Getting Along and is now available as a free PDF download. Also in 2005, she co-wrote Too Stressed to Think? A teen guide to staying sane when life makes you CRAZY (Free Spirit Publishing, 2005). Too Stressed to Think? was well-reviewed by Scholastic Choices. Be Confident in Who You Are is Book 1 of Fox's Middle School Confidential series for 10- to 14-year-olds. The format of the book, which is similar to a graphic novel, makes her self-help book for kids stand out from other similar titles, according to School Library Journal. It was published by Free Spirit in 2008. Book 2: Real Friends vs. the Other Kind was published in June 2009, and Book 3: What's Up with my Family? was published in January 2010.

Fox and David Fox's multi-media company, Electric Eggplant, developed and published the Middle School Confidential graphic novel app series based on the popular books. Fox's latest book, The Girls Q&A Book on Friendship: 50 Ways to Fix a Friendship Without the DRAMA, first in her new Girls Q&A Book series, was published on October 1, 2014.

== Works ==
- People Are Like Lollipops. Holiday House, 1971.
- Can You Relate: Real-World Advice on Guys, Girls, Growing Up, and Getting Along. Free Spirit Publishing, 2000. Re-released as The Teen Survival Guide to Dating and Relating: Real-World Advice on Guys, Girls, Growing Up, and Getting Along. Free Spirit Publishing, 2005.
- Too Stressed to Think? A teen guide to staying sane when life makes you CRAZY. By Annie Fox and Ruth Kirschner. Free Spirit Publishing, 2005.
- Middle School Confidential: Be Confident in Who You Are. Free Spirit, 2008.
- Middle School Confidential: Real Friends vs. the Other Kind. 2009.
- Middle School Confidential: What's Up with my Family? 2010.
- The Girls' Q&A Book on Friendship: 50 Ways to Fix a Friendship Without the DRAMA 2014.
- The Little Things That Kill: A Teen Friendship Afterlife Apology Tour 2024.
- Leeta Simtar: A Life on Two Planets 2025.
