= Marin Computer Center =

Coordinates: 38.01971°N 122.54762°W

- Formation: 1977
- Founder: David Fox, Annie Fox
- Type: Non-profit
- Purpose: Public access microcomputer center, computer education
- Location: Marin County, California, U.S.

Opened in 1977 in Marin County, California, the Marin Computer Center was the world's first public access microcomputer center. The non-profit company was co-created by David Fox (later to become one of Lucasfilm Games' founding members) and author Annie Fox.

MCC (as it was known) initially featured the Atari 2600, an Equinox 100, 9 Processor Technology Sol 20 computers (S-100 bus systems), the Radio Shack Model I and the Commodore PET. In addition to providing computer access to the public it had classes on the programming language BASIC. Later, it added Apple II and Atari 8-bit computers, for a total of about 40 systems.

The Foxes left MCC in 1981, turning it over to new management, and later to the teens and young adults who helped run it.

== See also ==
- Public computer
