= Zak McKracken: Between Time and Space =

2008 video game

- Developer: Artificial Hair Bros.
- Publisher: Artificial Hair Bros.
- Engine: Visionaire Adventure Game Engine
- Platforms: Windows (2008); OS X, Linux (2015)
- Release: 20 April 2008; 12 May 2015
- Genre: Point-and-click adventure
- Mode: Single-player

Zak McKracken: Between Time and Space is a point-and-click adventure game by German studio Artificial Hair Bros., originally released in 2008. It is an unofficial fan sequel of the 1988 adventure game Zak McKracken and the Alien Mindbenders and was developed without the involvement or license of LucasArts. It contains numerous references to the original game, including easter eggs. The game took more than seven years to complete and has since been further developed, with a director's cut released in May 2015.

== Plot ==
As in the original game, the player assumes the role of Zak McKracken, a frustrated boulevard reporter from San Francisco. The story begins on the night of 27 July 2009. Zak, apparently working on a new story, stows away on board of a Russian freighter that flies from Memphis to Zürich. He dozes off and awakes when the aeroplane is held in mid-air by an UFO and boarded by aliens. He is caught before he can escape.

On the next day, Zak awakes in his bed in his apartment and deems the events as an intense dream. When he notices a bump on his head, he realises that it actually happened. Since he cannot remember why he was on board, he goes on to discover what led him there.

== Development ==
The game was released in German for Windows in April 2008. The developers have since worked on a director's cut in which several bugs were addressed, the story was expanded and other improvements were made. The director's cut also brought the game to the Mac and Linux and was translated into English (including voices) and French.

The game uses the Visionaire Adventure Game Engine which allows game developers without substantial know-how to create point-and-click adventures. The engine is able to process graphics, animations, film sequences and audio files and provides templates for the basic controls and the inventory system (similar to SCUMM). The developers based the controls of the game on the original game. The player moves between 2D scenes and can interact with certain characters and objects. Sometimes the player will see 3D sequences in which no interactions can be made, to advance the storyline.

== Reception ==
The original release was received favourably by German video game critics. GameStar considered it to be one of the best freeware games. Chip listed it as one of the 50 best freeware games and apps of all time. Peter Steinlechner of golem.de called the gameplay "cleverly built and beautifully original." He criticised the reuse of some underdeveloped puzzle mechanics of the original game and described the graphics as "not entirely ultramodern," but praised the dialogues and voice actors, as well as the verb-based user interface. He concluded with: "Between Time and Space is an exciting, funny and original game for which one could have asked money from fans of the genre." For Timo Steinhaus of gamona.de the game does not have to "shy away from comparisons to other, professionally created adventures". He praised the gameplay, the attention to detail of the developers, the music and the voiced dialogues.
