= Koronis Rift =

1985 video game

- Cover art by Terry Hoff
- Developer: Lucasfilm Games
- Publishers: NA: Epyx; EU: Activision
- Designer: Noah Falstein
- Programmers: Charlie Kellner; Aric Wilmunder; Ron Gilbert; Ken Rogoway (CoCo)
- Artists: Gary Winnick; James St. Louis
- Composer: Douglas Crockford
- Platforms: Atari 8-bit, Commodore 64, Amstrad CPC, Apple II, MSX2, ZX Spectrum, Color Computer 3
- Release: 1985: Atari 8-bit, C64; 1987: CoCo
- Genre: Strategy
- Mode: Single-player

Koronis Rift is a video game from Lucasfilm Games, produced and designed by Noah Falstein. Originally developed for the Atari 8-bit computers and the Commodore 64, Koronis Rift was published in 1984. It was ported to the Amstrad CPC, Apple II, MSX2, Tandy Color Computer 3, and ZX Spectrum.

The Atari and C64 version shipped on a flippy disk, with one version of the game on each side. A cassette version was also released for the Commodore 64. The Atari version requires computers with the GTIA chip installed in order to display properly.

Koronis Rift was one of two games in Lucasfilm Games' second wave (December 1985). The other was The Eidolon. Both enhanced the fractal technology developed for Rescue on Fractalus!. In Koronis Rift, the Atari 8-bit computer's additional colors (over those of the Commodore 64) allowed the programmers to gradually fade in the background rather than it suddenly popping in as in Rescue, an early example of depth cueing in a computer game.

== Gameplay ==
An enemy saucer and a hulk (Atari 8-bit)

The player controls a surface rover vehicle to enter several "rifts" on an alien planet which are effectively fractal mazes. A lost civilisation known as the Ancients has left strange machinery, so-called "hulks", within these rifts which are guarded by armed flying saucers of different design and color. Depending on their respective color, shields and gunshots of both the rover and the saucers are of varying effectiveness against each other; part of the game is figuring out which shield and weapon modules work best where.

By means of a drone robot, the rover can retrieve modules with various functions (which are not immediately obvious) from nearby hulks. It can only be deployed when all attacking Guardian Saucers have been destroyed. The modules can then be installed in the rover, analyzed aboard the player's space ship, or sold; the rover can carry up to six different modules at a time which can be activated and de-activated as the player sees fit. A large variety of modules is available: different weapon and shield modules with varying power levels and color codes, modules that increase the rover's power output, a mapper (activating an extra screen on the rover), and even one module that turns the retrieval probe into a bomb, destroying any hulks the probe is sent to investigate instead of retrieving modules.

Conversely, different types of hulks exist including one that simply "swallows" the probe without yielding a module, requiring the player to purchase a new probe (and possibly sell useful modules to raise the required funds).

The goal of the game is to find and destroy the saucer control base hulk which is located in the 20th rift. To this end, the player must explore the rifts, find hulks, retrieve and analyze modules and understand the color-coding of weapons and shields to overcome the increasingly aggressive and dangerous saucers. The game can be solved in several ways; the quickest is to acquire the bomb module and send the probe into the saucer base with the bomb module activated.

== Reception ==
Info rated Koronis Rift four stars out of five, stating that it was the best of Epyx's four Lucasfilm games. Computer Gaming World stated that "if KR is a game, it is also a puzzle ... arcade skill alone isn't enough". The reviewer did not enjoy the game because it was so difficult, but praised the graphics and sound and said it was in the top 10% of Atari games. Zzap!64 thought that the game was an improvement on its predecessor, Rescue on Fractalus, with superior graphics and gameplay. It was given an overall rating of 96%. Ahoy! recommended Koronis Rift to fans of Rescue on Fractalus.
