= Rescue on Fractalus! =

1985 computer game

- European Commodore 64/128 cover
- Developer: Lucasfilm Games
- Publishers: Epyx; Activision; Atari Corporation
- Director: David Fox
- Designers: David Fox; Loren Carpenter; Peter Langston; Charlie Kellner; Gary Winnick
- Platforms: Atari 8-bit, Atari 5200, Amstrad CPC, Apple II, Commodore 64, Color Computer 3, ZX Spectrum
- Release: 1985
- Genre: Space combat
- Mode: Single-player

Rescue On Fractalus! is a space combat simulator video game created by Lucasfilm Games. It was originally released in 1985 for the Atari 8-bit computers and Atari 5200 console, then ported to the Apple II, ZX Spectrum, Amstrad CPC, Tandy Color Computer 3, and Commodore 64. The player flies a space fighter near the surface of a planet, with the goal of rescuing downed pilots. The terrain is generated via fractals, from which the eponymous planet and game title are taken.

The game was one of the first two products from the fledgling Lucasfilm Computer Division Games Group led by Peter Langston. David Fox was the project leader and designer. Music was mainly composed by Charlie Kellner.

== Gameplay ==
=== Flying ===
Cockpit view (Atari 5200)

The game uses fractal technology to create the craggy mountains of an alien planet, where the visilibility was drastically reduced by the dense atmosphere. The player controls a fictional "Valkyrie" space fighter (converted for search and rescue duty) from a first-person view, attempting to land and pick up downed Ethercorps pilots. Some of these mountains hold anti-aircraft guns, which have to be avoided or destroyed. Due to the varied terrain, the direction finder has to be used to locate the pilots, whose visual beacons are often masked by mountain ridges.

At higher levels, the enemy Jaggis begin flying kamikaze saucers. The mission area also moves into day/night boundaries. Night missions are particularly difficult, requiring diligent use of the altimeter to avoid crashing.

Flying consumes fuel. The way to replenish this supply is to rescue downed pilots who bring their remaining fuel supplies on board.

The thick atmosphere is sufficiently acidic that downed pilots' craft are being slowly disintegrated. An exposed pilot's survival time outside his craft is less than a minute, due to his flight suit and helmet literally dissolving. This makes it imperative that the player rescue pilots as quickly and efficiently as possible.

=== Rescue ===
After landing within sufficient "walking" proximity to the pilot, the player shuts down the engine, also turning off the ship's shields. Turning on the engines prematurely would incinerate the exposed pilot and the shields would prevent him from entering the ship, but are required if the player wishes to defend themselves from attacking enemies while landed. The downed pilot then disembarks his crashed ship, runs down to the Valkyrie's cockpit, and knocks on the crew entry door; the player can then open up and let the pilot in to complete the rescue. Failing to open the door kills the pilot; his knocking on the hatch becomes at first frantic, then slower and more feeble as he perishes in the corrosive environment. Sometimes the pilot found is an Ace Pilot, indicated visually by their purple helmet. These are worth ten times the score awarded for a normal pilot to the player.

Jaggi attacks (Atari 8-bit)

As a twist on this relatively straightforward premise, added at the suggestion of George Lucas, some of the "pilots in distress" are actually hostile aliens in disguise; this twist was kept out of the game's manual and marketing. After landing near a downed pilot, the player watches him run off-screen, and then has to wait for several tense seconds—if it were human, the familiar, frantic "tap-tap" noise would be heard from the ship's hatch; otherwise, the alien Jaggi would suddenly jump back into view, sans helmet, roaring and trying to smash into the cockpit. Unless the player restores the ship's shields, the windscreen cracks open and the pilot is killed. Likewise, inadvertently letting a Jaggi pilot into the player's ship has disastrous results — it begins to dismantle the ship. In early levels, the Jaggi can be distinguished by their green heads versus the white human helmets, but in later levels the aliens evidently learn to don the human helmet and become identical in appearance. This, along with an unpredictable pause between the human/alien approach and the tap-tap/alien jump makes for a tense experience. According to head developer David Fox, this shock moment made Rescue on Fractalus! "the first computer game to really scare people".

== Development ==
Rescue on Fractalus!, together with Ballblazer, were the first two games developed by the fledgling Lucasfilm Computer Division Games Group. The Games Group had been established in 1982 on a $1 million funding from Atari, Inc. in exchange for the "right of first refusal" for Atari as publisher. Both games were developed with the Atari 8-bit computers and Atari 5200 console in mind.

During development, Rescue on Fractalus! was named Behind Jaggi Lines!. This name refers both to the Jaggis, the fictional race of hostile aliens in the game, as well as the lack of spatial anti-aliasing in the game's graphics, resulting in jagged diagonal (or curved) lines, colloquially known as "jaggies". The squiggles visible on the Jaggi's suit when it attacks are actually the initials of the development team rotated by 90 degrees; Atari at the time famously barred developers from having their name displayed in games.

The developers of Rescue on Fractalus wanted the game to be set in Star Wars universe but were not allowed to do so by George Lucas.

The games were ready by March 1984 and were first publicly revealed on a Lucasfilm press conference on May 8. Cartridge versions for the Atari computers and the 5200 were planned to be the released first in the third quarter of 1984, with disk versions for the Commodore 64, IBM PC and Apple IIc and IIe coming under the Atarisoft label in the fourth quarter of that year. Rescue on Fractalus! and Ballblazer were also scheduled to be released for the then-upcoming Atari 7800 console.

On July 3, Warner Communications sold all assets of the Consumer Division of Atari, Inc. to Jack Tramiel, and the agreement with Lucasfilm fell through. On the Winter Consumer Electronics Show on January 5–8, 1985, with both Rescue on Fractalus! and Ballblazer not yet being released on any platform, Epyx became a distributor for both games, which would be released in disk format for the Atari 8-bit and Commodore 64 computers. The Atari 5200 versions were not part of the distribution deal. Epyx finally published the Atari 8-bit versions of both games by May 1985, and the Commodore 64 version of Rescue by August of that year.

Besides the Atari 8-bit and Commodore 64 computers, Rescue on Fractalus was ported to the Apple II and TRS-80 Color Computer; and to Amstrad CPC and ZX Spectrum computers by Activision, who published the game in Europe. While the IBM PC port announced in 1984 never materialized, Tramiel's Atari Corporation eventually released the Atari 5200 cartridge version in limited quantities in late 1986, manufactured from the stock inherited from the July 1984 buyout of Atari, Inc.; and the cartridge version for the Atari 8-bit computers in December 1987, packaged for their new XE Game System.

The Atari 7800 version was cancelled before the game was completed. In 2004, an unfinished prototype was found in the possession of its original programmers, with a significant amount of gameplay elements not implemented.

== Reception ==
Computer Gaming World stated that Fractalus and Ballblazer "are slightly weak in the finer points of game design, but ... set a new standard for arcade-style games that will set out future expectations". In 1996, the magazine named Rescue on Fractalus! the 82nd best game ever, with the editors remarking that "many keep old computers around just to play it". Commodore User thought the game was "nothing special" and said it "provides reasonable, if unchanging, gameplay with a good flight simulator, but it lacks something, probably a proper identity". Zzap!64 were impressed by the game, awarding it a score of 91%. They said that it was an excellent shoot-em-up. Ahoy! praised the graphics and advised fans to also play Koronis Rift.

== Legacy ==
LucasArts and Factor 5 began work on a sequel titled Return to Fractalus for the Amiga in the late 1980s, but it was decided that the hardware couldn't handle the concept being worked on. An Amiga port of Rescue On Fractalus to be published by Rainbow Arts was announced in a February 1991 issue of The One, but was never released. By 1994, Factor 5 believed that the current generation of 3D consoles had the technology the Fractalus sequel required and again began work on the game. Eventually, the work on game was converted to Star Wars: Rogue Squadron for the Nintendo 64 instead.

== See also ==
- Ballblazer
- The Eidolon
