= Noah Falstein =

American video game designer

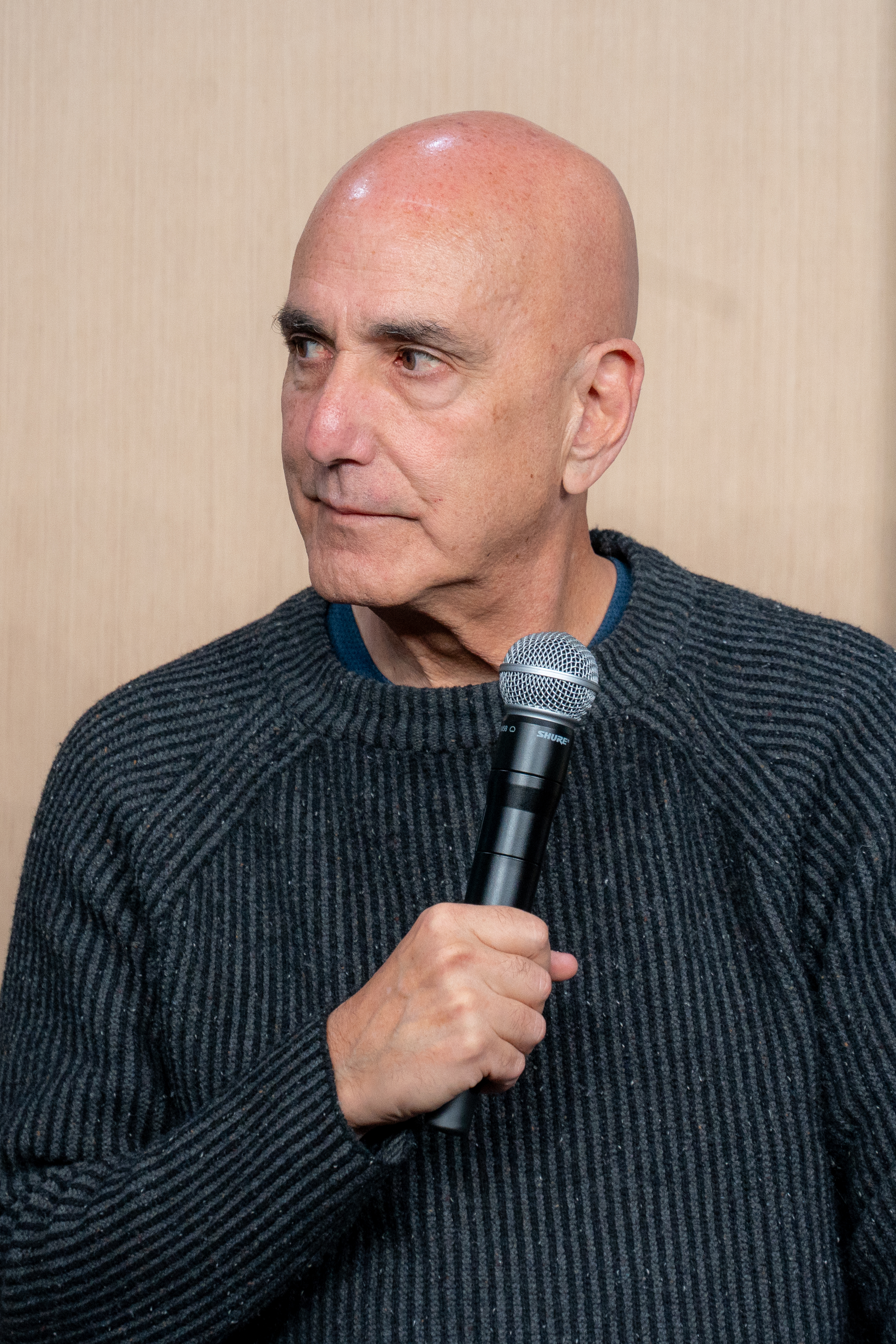
- Noah Falstein, 2025
- Born: 1957 (age 68–69)
- Known for: Game designer & programmer Indiana Jones and the Fate of Atlantis
- Website: http://theinspiracy.com

Noah Falstein (born June 1957) is a game designer and producer who has been in the video game industry since 1980, winning "Game of the Year" titles for multiple games such as Battlehawks 1942 and Indiana Jones and the Fate of Atlantis. He has designed games for multiple platforms, including arcade video games, Commodore 64, and MS-DOS.

He was one of the first 10 employees at Lucasfilm Games, joining them in 1984; the third employee at DreamWorks Interactive in 1995; and also one of the early employees at The 3DO Company. He was the first elected chairperson of the International Game Developers Association, which he chaired from 1997 to 1998. He wrote the "Better by Design" column for Game Developer magazine from 2002–2007.

From 2013–2017 he was Chief Game Designer at Google. As of 2021 he works for the game consulting company The Inspiracy, which he founded in 1996.

== Early life ==
Falstein was born and raised in Chicago, the youngest of three children to Wilbert Falstein, an advertising executive, and Kay Falstein, a nursery school teacher. He was designing toys at an early age, like taking wind-up toy cars and adding cardboard "skins" to them to turn them into boats or spaceships. He also loved to draw up blueprints of imaginative science fiction vehicles and spaceships, and found himself enjoying and designing his own boardgames, then iterating on his designs to make them more and more fun. He had his first exposure to computers at Rogers Elementary School in 1970, learning Fortran that was input on punch cards. Later, while at Mather High School there was some limited access to computers, but when he was 15 he was prompted by exposure to the early game by Nolan Bushnell, Computer Space, to seek out PLATO terminals at a nearby community college. He graduated high school in 1975, then attending Hampshire College, where he began programming his own games. At first they were text-only teletype games, and then he created a much larger senior product in APL: Koronis Strike: A Simulation of Mining and Combat in the Asteroid Belt, which featured realistic orbital mechanics and ran on the school's first video terminal via a dialup connection to the University of Massachusetts Amherst CDC 6600 time-share system. In the game, the player fired at asteroids to learn their composition. He also intended to put in adversaries and combat, but ran out of time before he graduated. He did continue to use the name in one of his later projects though, when he designed Koronis Rift for LucasFilm Games.

== Career ==
He received a bachelor's degree from Hampshire College in 1980, and then one week after graduation he began work at the Milton Bradley Company's Advanced Research division. This led to a job at Williams Electronics, where he co-designed the arcade game Sinistar. In 1984, he became one of the first 10 employees at LucasFilm Games, where he led brainstorming sessions with Steven Spielberg and George Lucas, and created games for home computers and IBM-compatible computers such as Koronis Rift (1986), Battlehawks 1942 (Action Game of the Year, 1992), Indiana Jones and the Last Crusade and Indiana Jones and the Fate of Atlantis (Adventure Game of the Year, 1992). In 1995, he became one of the first employees at DreamWorks Interactive, creating such games as Chaos Island.

In 1996, Falstein formed The Inspiracy, a consulting firm specializing in game design and production for clients on five continents, ranging from corporate training (Cisco, Microsoft) to medical education (Hopelab, Health Media Lab, Medical Cyberworlds) to entertainment (LucasArts, Disney, DreamCatcher, Micro Forte).

The Inspiracy also allowed Falstein to help with various game startups, and he was actively involved in the growing worldwide community of game developers. In 1997 he became the first elected chairperson of the International Game Developers Association, a position he held for one year. He has been on the advisory boards of the Games for Health Conference, the Serious Games Summit and Akili Interactive Labs.

In 2013 he put his consulting firm on hold when he was hired by Google as Chief Game Designer, a position he held for four years, and then he returned to consulting.

In 2002, Falstein and fellow LucasArts alum Hal Barwood began "The 400 Project", an attempt to collect rules of computer game design under a standard format, with their prediction that it would be around 400 rules. This project continued for several years as they collated lists of rules on their respective websites, and gave followup talks at places such as the Game Developers Conference in San Jose, California. The project garnered considerable attention and is now regularly cited in academic articles.

As of 2021, Falstein is active in the development of the emerging market of serious games, most often Games for Health. One such game, EndeavorRx, by Akili Interactive Labs, is the first game to receive formal clearance from the FDA. Doctors can formally prescribe the playing of the game for children with pediatric ADHD.

== Public speaking ==
Falstein has spoken at hundreds of venues around the world, from game conferences to universities to the Goddard Spaceflight Center. He was the keynote speaker in 2017 at the Øredev software developers conference in Sweden.

== Games ==
- Joust (arcade video game) - Debugger, playtester (Williams Electronics, 1982)
- Sinistar (arcade video game) - project leader, co-designer (Williams Electronics, 1983)
- Mystic Marathon (arcade video game) - Enemy concepts (Williams Electronics, 1984)
- Koronis Rift (Commodore 64) - project leader, designer, programmer (Lucasfilm Games, 1985)
- PHM Pegasus (Commodore 64) - project leader, designer, programmer (Lucasfilm Games, 1986)
- Strike Fleet (Commodore 64) - project leader, designer (Lucasfilm Games, 1988)
- Battlehawks 1942 (MS-DOS) - producer, design contributor (Lucasfilm Games, 1988)
- Indiana Jones and the Last Crusade: The Graphic Adventure (MS-DOS) - co-project leader, co-designer (LucasArts, 1989)
- Indiana Jones and the Fate of Atlantis (MS-DOS) - co-designer (LucasArts, 1992)
- Chaos Island (Windows) - designer (DreamWorks Interactive, 1997)
- Total Annihilation: Kingdoms (Windows) - writer (GT Interactive, 1997)
- Hungry Red Planet (Windows) - designer (Health Media Lab, 2002)
- Mata Hari (Windows) - designer, writer (DTP Entertainment, 2008)
