= Antonino Cardillo =

Italian architect (born 1975)

- Born: 18 May 1975 (age 51); Erice, Sicily, Italy
- Education: University of Palermo
- Occupation: Architect
- Website: antoninocardillo.com

Antonino Cardillo (born 1975) is an Italian architect.

== Selected works ==
- House of Dust
- Specus Corallii
