= Indiana Jones and the Last Crusade: The Graphic Adventure =

1989 video game

- Developer: Lucasfilm Games
- Publisher: Lucasfilm Games
- Designers: Ron Gilbert; Noah Falstein; David Fox
- Artists: Steve Purcell; Martin Cameron; James A. Dollar; Mike Ebert; James McLeod
- Composers: Eric Hammond; FM Towns: Dave Warhol; James Leiterman
- Engine: SCUMM
- Platforms: MS-DOS, Amiga, Atari ST, Mac, FM Towns, CDTV
- Release: July 1989: MS-DOS, Amiga, Atari ST; 1990: Mac, FM Towns; 1992: CDTV; July 08, 2009: Steam
- Genre: Graphic adventure
- Mode: Single-player

Indiana Jones and the Last Crusade: The Graphic Adventure is a graphic adventure game, released in 1989 by Lucasfilm Games, coinciding with the release of the film of the same name. It was the third game to use the SCUMM engine.

== Gameplay ==
An action verb ("Walk to") has been applied to the pool of water. Indiana Jones is saying that he hates water.

Last Crusade expanded on Lucasfilm Games' traditional adventure game structure by including a flexible point system—the IQ score, or "Indy Quotient"—and by allowing the game to be completed in several different ways. The point system was similar to that of Sierra's adventure games, however when the game was restarted or restored, the total IQ of the previous game was retained. The only way to reach the maximum IQ of 800 was by finding alternative solutions to puzzles, such as fighting a guard instead of avoiding him. This countered one common criticism of adventures games, whereby since there is only one way to finish the game, they have no replay value. Also, the point system helped the game to appeal to a variety of player types. Some of the alternative fights, such as the one with the Zeppelin attendant, were very difficult to pass, so the maximum IQ was very difficult to achieve.

A replica of Henry Jones' Grail diary was included with earlier versions of the game. While very different from the film's version, it provided a collection of background information of Indy's youth and Henry's life. The diary was also necessary to solve puzzles near the end of the game, most notably to identify the real Grail. Later versions of the game came with a shortened version of the Grail diary.

== Plot ==
The plot closely follows, and expands upon, the film of Indiana Jones and the Last Crusade. As the game begins, Indiana Jones has returned to his college, after reclaiming the Cross of Coronado. He is approached by businessman Walter Donovan, who tells him about the Holy Grail, and of the disappearance of Indy's father.

Indy then travels to some of the places seen in the movie, such as Venice and the catacombs, after meeting fellow archeologist Elsa Schneider. In the process he finds his father held captive in the Brunwald Castle, after passing through the mazelike corridors, fighting and avoiding guards. Then Elsa's double role is revealed when she steals the Grail Diary from Indy. After escaping, father and son pass through Berlin to reclaim the Diary and have a brief meeting with Adolf Hitler. Then they reach an airport, from where they intend to seek the Valley of the Crescent Moon, by Zeppelin or biplane. There are many action scenes, involving punching, and the biplane sequence above Europe, pursued by Nazi planes.

Several key elements of the film - such as the Brotherhood of the Grail, Indy's friend Sallah, and the Venice water chase and the desert battle scenes (except for small hidden references) - were not included in the game.

== Development ==
The game was released in May 1989 simultaneously with the movie. It was available for DOS, Amiga, Atari ST, and Mac OS. A CD-ROM version was later released for the FM Towns, with 256-color graphics and a CD Audio soundtrack, as well as a VGA PC version. Many of the scenes unique to the game were conceived by George Lucas and Steven Spielberg during the creation of the movie. Last Crusade was also the first Lucasfilm game to include the verbs Look and Talk. In several situations, the latter would begin a primitive dialogue system in which the player could choose one of several lines to say. The system was fully evolved in The Secret of Monkey Island and remained in all later LucasArts adventures, with the exception of Loom.

== Reception ==
UK magazine Computer and Video Games gave the PC version a score of 91%, praising the graphics, sound and playability and calling it "a brilliant film tie-in and a superlative game in its own right". In 1989, Dragon gave the game 5 out of 5 stars. The game was ranked the 28th best game of all time by Amiga Power. Charles Ardai of Computer Gaming World gave the game a positive review, noting its cinematic qualities and well-designed puzzles. Game Informer's retro review section awarded the game a nine out of ten.

The Last Crusade became a "sizeable hit", according to Hal Barwood. It was Lucasfilm's best-selling game at the time of its release, with sales of over 250,000 copies.

In 1991, PC Format placed The Last Crusade on its list of the 50 best computer games of all time. The editors wrote that Indy was recreated on the monitor screen impressively as on the big screen.

== Legacy ==
A second Indiana Jones graphic adventure, Indiana Jones and the Fate of Atlantis, was released in 1992.

Two supposed successors to Fate of Atlantis, Iron Phoenix and The Spear of Destiny, were canceled. Both were later adapted into comics.

== See also ==
- LucasArts adventure games
- ScummVM
