= House of Dust (architecture) =

Work of architecture

House of Dust is an architectural work built in 2013 in Rome, designed by the Italian architect Antonino Cardillo.
