= The Eidolon =

1985 video game

- Cover artwork by Ken Macklin
- Developer: Lucasfilm Games
- Publishers: Epyx; Activision
- Designer: Charlie Kellner
- Programmer: Lance Saleme (Apple)
- Platforms: Amstrad CPC, Apple II, Atari 8-bit, Commodore 64, MSX, ZX Spectrum
- Release: C64, Atari 8-bit: NA: November 1985; Apple II: NA: December 1985
- Genres: First-person shooter, adventure
- Mode: Single-player

The Eidolon is one of two games that were part of Lucasfilm Games' second wave in December 1985. The other was Koronis Rift. Both took advantage of the fractal technology developed for Rescue on Fractalus!, further enhancing it. In The Eidolon, Rescue's fractal mountains were turned upside down and became the inside of a cave.

In addition to cassette formats, the Atari and Commodore 64 versions were supplied on a single floppy disk. One side has the version for Atari 8-bit computers and the other has the Commodore 64 version.

== Plot ==
The player discovers the Eidolon, a strange 19th-century vehicle, in an abandoned laboratory. As the player investigates this device, he is accidentally transported to another dimension and is trapped in a vast, maze-like cave. The creatures in this cave, sensing the energy emanating from the Eidolon, are woken from a long slumber, and the player soon finds that his only chance of survival lies in this mysterious vehicle and its powerful energy weapon.

== Gameplay ==
Dragon guarding the end of a level.

The objective of The Eidolon is to successfully navigate through all of the game's levels, defeating the dragon guardian at the end of each level. The player navigates through each maze and collects energy orbs, which come in four different colors (red, yellow, green and blue). Along the way, various enemies wake up and attack the Eidolon, attempting to absorb its energy. Some enemies also fire orbs at the Eidolon, of which all but the red orbs can be absorbed by pressing the space bar at the right time to replenish the Eidolon's limited energy.

Green orbs also have the power to transform other enemies into different kinds of enemies. Blue orbs can freeze enemies temporarily, giving the player a momentary advantage in a fight.

Each level contains three diamonds, each guarded by an enemy of a specific color. After defeating each of these enemies and collecting the diamonds, the player can proceed to the dragon that guards the exit. There are eight levels in a game. The game is over when the player has successfully defeated the final dragon or runs out of time.

== Reception ==
Reception

Review score
Publication	Score
Zzap!64	97%

Zzap!64 gave the game a Gold Medal award, with an overall 97% score. The summary of the reviews from their three reviewers was "Lucasfilm's most original release yet, containing outstanding graphics and gameplay elements. The Eidolon is both immaculate in it's [sic] conception and execution. Not to be missed".

Gregg Williams of Computer Gaming World disliked The Eidolon, stating that it was as difficult as Koronis Rift but with no save game feature. While praising the graphics and sound, Charles Ardai criticized the game for "a lack of imagination. You get transported to god-knows-where ... and you basically shoot everything in sight. Is this a reasonable—let alone responsible—way to explore a new world?" Ardai later described the game in the magazine as "one of the worst" of 1986.

The game was positively reviewed in a retrospective article in Retro Gamer magazine. It was praised for being "wonderfully atmospheric" due to the technical achievement of the fractally created environment. It was also considered to be the most ambitious and original release of the 3 Lucasfilm games which used fractal routines. Overall it was described as "a fascinating snapshot of gaming history that showed how innovative, immersive and tense a first-person style arcade-adventure could be on 8-bit platforms".
