= NewsTrust =

Non-profit news network

NewsTrust was a non-profit news network that operated a website where users were able to reference news stories, rate those stories according to quality of journalism, post reviews, and add stories they found worthwhile. It was operated and co-founded by former Wikimedia Foundation staff member, Fabrice Florin.

== History ==
NewsTrust was first presented as an idea via MoveOn.org, in which MoveOn co-founder Wes Boyd expressed concern about traditional media "losing" its way. He recruited Fabrice Florin, then CEO of cellular content provider Handtap Communications, to run the effort as part of NewsTrust Communications of Mill Valley, California. Users and editors of the NewsTrust website would rate news stories on a daily basis as to whether they were "news you can trust". The site was launched in a basic mode in May 2005.

In 2011, NewsTrust piloted a Baltimore-specific site focused on news local to the Baltimore area. NewsTrust launched in Baltimore due to its proximity to the Open Society Institute's Baltimore offices, and hired a former editor of the Baltimore Sun, Mary Hartney, as the editor. The Baltimore pilot ended six months after it was launched, although user-submitted content continued to be posted, and the NewsTrust mission shifted to a more "fact-checking service"-based model for the 2012 election. From June 2012 until the website went offline, NewsTrust was owned and operated by the Poynter Institute.

== Partnerships and funding ==
NewsTrust had many media partners, including The Huffington Post, PolitiFact and The Washington Post, and advisers including Howard Rheingold of Stanford University and Craig Newmark of Craigslist. NewsTrust also received financial donations from nonprofit foundations and private donors, including a $500,000 grant from the MacArthur Foundation in 2008, and one by Omidyar Network in 2010.
