= List of Activision games: 1980–1999 =

Activision video games 1980–1999

The following is a list of Activision games from 1980 to 1999.

Title	Platform(s)	Release date	Developer(s)	Ref(s)
Boxing	Atari 2600	August 1980	Activision	Ref(s)
Bridge	Atari 2600	December 1980	Activision	
Checkers	Atari 2600	August 1980	Activision	
Dragster	Atari 2600	August 1980	Activision	
Fishing Derby	Atari 2600	August 1980	Activision	
Skiing	Atari 2600	December 1980	Activision	
Freeway	Atari 2600	July 1981	Activision	
Ice Hockey	Atari 2600	December 1981	Activision	
Kaboom!	Atari 2600	July 1981	Activision	
Laser Blast	Atari 2600	March 1981	Activision	
Stampede	Atari 2600	December 1981	Activision	
Tennis	Atari 2600	March 1981	Activision	
Chopper Command	Atari 2600	June 1982	Activision	
Starmaster	Atari 2600	June 1982	Activision	
Megamania	Atari 2600	September 24, 1982	Activision	
Pitfall!	Atari 2600	September 1982	Activision	
Pitfall!	Intellivision	November 1982	Activision	
Sky Jinks	Atari 2600	November 1982	Activision	
Stampede	Intellivision	November 1982	Activision	
River Raid	Atari 2600	December 1982	Activision	
Barnstorming	Atari 2600	March 1982	Activision	
Grand Prix	Atari 2600	March 1982	Activision	
Spider Fighter	Atari 2600	January 1983	Activision	
Seaquest	Atari 2600	February 1983	Activision	
Oink!	Atari 2600	April 1983	Activision	
Dolphin	Atari 2600	May 1983	Activision	
Enduro	Atari 2600	May 1983	Activision	
Happy Trails	Intellivision	May 1983	Activision	
Keystone Kapers	Atari 2600	May 1983	Activision	
Plaque Attack	Atari 2600	May 1983	Activision	
Robot Tank	Atari 2600	June 1983	Activision	
Crackpots	Atari 2600	July 1983	Activision	
The Activision Decathlon	Atari 2600	August 1983	Activision	
Beamrider	Intellivision	September 1983	Cheshire Engineering	
The Dreadnaught Factor	Intellivision	September 1983	Cheshire Engineering	
Frostbite	Atari 2600	October 1983	Activision	
Kaboom!	Atari 8-bit	October 1983	Activision	
Pressure Cooker	Atari 2600	October 1983	Activision	
River Raid	Atari 8-bit	October 1983	Activision	
Worm Whomper	Intellivision	October 1983	Cheshire Engineering	
Kaboom!	Atari 5200	November 1983	Activision	
Megamania	Atari 5200	November 1983	Activision	
River Raid	Atari 5200	November 1983	Activision	
Space Shuttle: A Journey into Space	Atari 2600	November 1983	Activision	
River Raid	Intellivision	December 1983	Activision	
Pitfall!	MSX	September 1984	Activision	
Megamania	Atari 8-bit	February 1984	Activision	
Private Eye	Atari 2600	February 1984	Activision	
River Raid	ColecoVision	February 1984	Sydney Development Corporation	
Beamrider	Atari 2600	March 1984	Cheshire Engineering	
H.E.R.O.	Atari 2600	March 30, 1984	Activision	
Pitfall!	Atari 8-bit	March 1984	Beck-Tech	
Pitfall!	ColecoVision	March 1984	Beck-Tech	
Pitfall II: Lost Caverns	Atari 2600	March 1984	Activision	
Beamrider	ColecoVision	May 1984	Action Graphics	
Keystone Kapers	Atari 8-bit	May 1984	Activision	
The Dreadnaught Factor	Atari 5200	May 1984	Cheshire Engineering	
The Dreadnaught Factor	Atari 8-bit	May 1984	Cheshire Engineering	
Beamrider	Commodore 64	June 1984	Action Graphics	
H.E.R.O.	Apple II	June 1984	Microsmiths	
Keystone Kapers	ColecoVision	June 1984	Activision	
Pitfall II: Lost Caverns	Atari 5200	June 1984	Activision	
Keystone Kapers	Atari 5200	July 1984	Activision	
Pitfall!	Commodore 64	July 1984	Activision	
Beamrider	Atari 8-bit	August 1984	Action Graphics	
H.E.R.O.	Atari 8-bit	August 1984	Activision	
H.E.R.O.	ColecoVision	August 1984	Activision	
Pitfall II: Lost Caverns	Atari 8-bit	August 1984	Activision	
The Activision Decathlon	Atari 8-bit	August 1984	Activision	
The Activision Decathlon	ColecoVision	August 1984	Activision	
Toy Bizarre	Commodore 64	August 1984	Activision	
H.E.R.O.	Atari 5200	September 1984	Activision	
H.E.R.O.	Commodore 64	September 1984	The Softworks	
Pitfall II: Lost Caverns	Commodore 64	September 1984	Activision	
The Activision Decathlon	Atari 5200	September 1984	Activision	
The Activision Decathlon	Commodore 64	September 1984	Action Graphics	
Beamrider	Atari 5200	October 1984	Action Graphics	
Beamrider	MSX	October 1984	Action Graphics	
Beamrider	ZX Spectrum	October 1984	Software Conversions	
Enduro	ZX Spectrum	October 1984	James Software	
Ghostbusters	Commodore 64	October 26, 1984	Activision	
H.E.R.O.	ZX Spectrum	October 1984	Software Conversions	
Park Patrol	Commodore 64	October 1984	Activision	
Pastfinder	Atari 8-bit	October 1984	Activision	
Pastfinder	Commodore 64	October 1984	Activision	
Pitfall II: Lost Caverns	ColecoVision	October 1984	Activision	
River Raid	ZX Spectrum	October 1984	Software Conversions	
Space Shuttle: A Journey into Space	Atari 5200	October 1984	Activision	
The Activision Decathlon	MSX	October 1984	Activision	
Zenji	Atari 5200	October 1984	Activision	
Zenji	Atari 8-bit	October 1984	Activision	
Zenji	ColecoVision	October 1984	Activision	
Zenji	Commodore 64	October 1984	Activision	
Zenji	MSX	October 1984	Action Graphics	
Zenji	ZX Spectrum	October 1984	Action Graphics	
Zone Ranger	Atari 5200	October 1984	Activision	
Zone Ranger	Atari 8-bit	October 1984	Activision	
Pitfall II: Lost Caverns	MSX	November 1984	Activision	
Zone Ranger	Commodore 64	November 1984	Activision	
Ghostbusters	MSX	December 1984	Activision	
Ghostbusters	ZX Spectrum	December 1984	James Software	
Pitfall II: Lost Caverns	Apple II	December 1984	Microsmiths	
Pitfall II: Lost Caverns	ZX Spectrum	December 1984	Software Conversions	
Space Shuttle: A Journey into Space	Atari 8-bit	December 1984	Activision	
Space Shuttle: A Journey into Space	ZX Spectrum	December 1984	James Software	
Cosmic Commuter	Atari 2600	1985	Activision	
H.E.R.O.	MSX	1984	The Softworks	
Pastfinder	MSX	1984	Activision	
Pitfall!	Atari 5200	1984	Beck-Tech	
River Raid	Commodore 64	1984	Micro Projects	
Space Shuttle: A Journey into Space	Commodore 64	1984	James Software	
Ghostbusters	Apple II	January 1985	Activision	
Ghostbusters	Atari 8-bit	February 1985	Activision	
Pitfall II: Lost Caverns	MSX	January 1985	Activision	
River Raid	MSX	January 1985	Activision	
Rock n' Bolt	Commodore 64	February 1985	Action Graphics	
Mindshadow	Commodore 64	March 1985	Interplay Productions	
Master of the Lamps	Commodore 64	April 1985	Activision	
Mindshadow	Apple II	April 1985	Interplay Productions	
Mindshadow	IBM PC (self-booting)	April 1985	Interplay Productions	
Space Shuttle: A Journey into Space	Apple II	April 1985	Activision	
The Tracer Sanction	Apple II	April 1985	Interplay Productions	
The Tracer Sanction	Commodore 64	April 1985	Interplay Productions	
The Tracer Sanction	IBM PC (self-booting)	April 1985	Interplay Productions	
Web Dimension	Commodore 64	April 1985	Activision	
Ghostbusters	Amstrad CPC	May 1985	James Software	
On-Field Football	Commodore 64	May 1985	Gamestar	
River Raid	IBM PC (self-booting)	June 1985	Activision	
The Great American Cross-Country Road Race	Atari 8-bit	June 1985	Activision	
Mindshadow	Atari 8-bit	July 1985	Interplay Productions	
Rescue on Fractalus!	Commodore 64	July 1985	Softalent	
Ghostbusters	IBM PC (self-booting)	August 1985	Activision	
Hacker	Commodore 64	August 1985	Activision	
Master of the Lamps	Amstrad CPC	August 1985	James Software	
Master of the Lamps	Atari 8-bit	August 1985	Activision	
Hacker	Apple II	September 1985	Activision	
Hacker	Atari 8-bit	September 1985	Activision	
Master of the Lamps	Apple II	September 1985	Activision	
The Great American Cross-Country Road Race	Apple II	September 1985	Synergistic Software	
Fast Tracks: The Computer Slot Car Construction Kit	Commodore 64	October 1985	Activision	
Ghostbusters	Atari 2600	October 1985	Activision	
Hacker	Mac OS	October 1985	Activision	Activision
Hacker	ZX Spectrum	October 1985	Softzone	
Little Computer People	Commodore 64	October 1985	Activision	
Ballblazer	Atari 8-bit	November 1985	Lucasfilm Games	
Borrowed Time	Commodore 64	November 1985	Interplay Productions\	
Borrowed Time	IBM PC (self-booting)	November 1985	Interplay Productions\	
Hacker	Amiga	November 1985	Activision	
Mindshadow	Amiga	November 1985	Interplay Productions	
Mindshadow	Mac OS	November 1985	Interplay Productions	
Ballblazer	Commodore 64	December 1985	K-Byte	
Borrowed Time	Apple II	December 1985	Interplay Productions	
Borrowed Time	Mac OS	December 1985	Interplay Productions	
Hacker	Atari ST	December 1985	Interplay Productions	
Koronis Rift	Commodore 64	December 1985	Lucasfilm Games	
Little Computer People	Apple II	December 1985	Activision	
Alcazar: The Forgotten Fortress	Apple II	1985	Activision	
Alcazar: The Forgotten Fortress	ColecoVision	1985	Activision	
Alcazar: The Forgotten Fortress	Commodore 64	1985	Activision	
Alcazar: The Forgotten Fortress	MSX	1985	Activision	
Countdown to Shutdown	Apple II	1985	Synergistic Software	
Master of the Lamps	MSX	1985	James Software	
Rescue on Fractalus!	Atari 8-bit	1985	Lucasfilm Games	
Rock n' Bolt	ColecoVision	1985	Action Graphics	
Star Rank Boxing	Amstrad CPC	1985	Gamestar	
Star Rank Boxing	ZX Spectrum	1985	Gamestar	
The Great American Cross-Country Road Race	Commodore 64	1985	Activision	
Toy Bizarre	ZX Spectrum	1985	James Software	
Borrowed Time	Amiga	January 1986	Interplay Productions	
Mindshadow	Amstrad CPC	January 1986	Softstone	
Mindshadow	ZX Spectrum	January 1986	Softstone	
Borrowed Time	Atari ST	February 1986	Interplay Productions	
Hacker	MS-DOS	February 1986	Activision	
Mindshadow	Atari ST	February 1986	Interplay Productions	
Ballblazer	ZX Spectrum	May 1986	Program Techniques	
Little Computer People	Amiga	June 1986	Activision	
Little Computer People	Atari ST	June 1986	Microsmiths	
Ballblazer	Amstrad CPC	1986	Program Techniques	
Hacker	Amstrad CPC	1986	Softzone	
Rescue on Fractalus!	Amstrad CPC	1986	Dalali Software	
Rescue on Fractalus!	ZX Spectrum	1986	Dalali Software	
Space Shuttle: A Journey into Space	Amstrad CPC	1986	James Software	
Space Shuttle: A Journey into Space	MSX	1986	Mr. Micro	
Star Rank Boxing	Thomson TO7	1986	Loriciels	
Ghostbusters	Sega Master System	May 1987	Compile	
Top Fuel Eliminator	Apple II	August 1987	Gamestar	
Top Fuel Eliminator	Commodore 64	August 1987	Gamestar	
Kung-Fu Master	Atari 2600	September 1987	Activision	
Gee Bee Air Rally	Amiga	October 1987	Activision	
Gee Bee Air Rally	Commodore 64	October 1987	Activision	
Super Pitfall	Nintendo Entertainment System	November 1987	Micronics	
Ballblazer	MSX	1987	Mr. Micro	
Enduro Racer	Amstrad CPC	1987	Software Studios	
Enduro Racer	Atari ST	1987	Giga Games	
Enduro Racer	Commodore 64	1987	Software Studios	
Enduro Racer	ZX Spectrum	1987	Software Studios	
Galactic Games	Amstrad CPC	1987	Tigress Marketing	
Galactic Games	Commodore 64	1987	Tigress Marketing	
Knightmare	Amstrad CPC	1987	Software Studios	
Knightmare	Commodore 64	1987	Software Studios	
Knightmare	ZX Spectrum	1987	Software Studios	
Koronis Rift	Amstrad CPC	1987	Mr. Micro	
Koronis Rift	MSX	1987	Mr. Micro	
Koronis Rift	ZX Spectrum	1987	Mr. Micro	
Laser Surgeon: The Microscopic Mission	MS-DOS	1987	Synergistic Software	
Laser Surgeon: The Microscopic Mission	TRS-80 CoCo	1987	Synergistic Software	
Little Computer People	Amstrad CPC	1987	Dalali Software	
Little Computer People	ZX Spectrum	1987	Activision	
Quartet	Amstrad CPC	1987	Probe Software	
Quartet	Commodore 64	1987	Probe Software	
Quartet	ZX Spectrum	1987	Probe Software	
Predator	Amstrad CPC	1987	Source the Software House	
Rampage	Atari 8-bit	1987	Software Studios	
Rampage	Atari ST	1987	Catalyst Coders	
Rampage	Commodore 64	1987	Software Studios	
Rampage	ZX Spectrum	1987	Software Studios	
SDI: Strategic Defense Initiative	Amiga	1987	Software Studios	
SDI: Strategic Defense Initiative	Atari ST	1987	Software Studios	
Wonder Boy	Amstrad CPC	1987	Escape	
Wonder Boy	Commodore 64	1987	Escape	
Wonder Boy	ZX Spectrum	1987	Activision	
Star Rank Boxing II	MS-DOS	January 1988	Brian A. Rice	
Rampage	MS-DOS	April 1988	Monarch Development	
Star Rank Boxing II	Commodore 64	May 1988	The Softworks Factory	
Commando	Atari 2600	June 1988	Imagineering	
The Last Ninja	MS-DOS	July 1988	System 3 Software	
Star Rank Boxing II	Apple II	August 1988	The Softworks Factory	
Ghostbusters	Nintendo Entertainment System	October 1988	Bits Laboratory	
Ocean Ranger	Commodore 64	October 1988	Sher-Tek Software	
The Last Ninja	Apple IIGS	October 1988	System 3 Software	
The Last Ninja	Commodore 64	October 1988	System 3 Software	
Rampage	Apple II	November 1988	Monarch Development	
River Raid II	Atari 2600	November 1988	Imagineering	
The Last Ninja	Apple II	November 1988	Tanager Software Productions	
Chop N' Drop	Commodore 64	December 1988	System 3 Software	
Predator	Commodore 64	December 1988	Software Studios	
After Burner II	Amiga	1988	Argonaut Software	
After Burner II	Amstrad CPC	1988	Software Studios	
After Burner II	Atari ST	1988	Dalali Software	
After Burner II	MSX	1988	Software Studios	
After Burner II	ZX Spectrum	1988	Software Studios	
Atlantis	Atari 2600	1988	Imagic	
Corporation	Commodore 64	1988	Focus Creative Enterprises	
Demon Attack	Atari 2600	1988	Imagic	
Double Dragon	Atari 2600	1988	Imagineering	
Galactic Games	ZX Spectrum	1988	Tigress Marketing	
Gee Bee Air Rally	Amstrad CPC	1988	Activision	
Gee Bee Air Rally	ZX Spectrum	1988	Activision	
Knightmare	Atari ST	1988	Software Studios	
Moonsweeper	Atari 2600	1988	Imagic	
Predator	Atari ST	1988	Software Studios	
Predator	ZX Spectrum	1988	Source the Software House	
Rampage	Amstrad CPC	1988	Software Studios	
SDI: Strategic Defense Initiative	Commodore 64	1988	Source the Software House	
SDI: Strategic Defense Initiative	ZX Spectrum	1988	Software Studios	
The Real Ghostbusters	Amiga	1988	Activision	
The Real Ghostbusters	Atari ST	1988	Activision	
The Real Ghostbusters	Amstrad CPC	1988	Software Studios	
Rampage	Master System	January 1989	Sega	
F-14 Tomcat	Commodore 64	January 1989	Dynamix	
Last Ninja 2: Back with a Vengeance	Commodore 64	April 1989	System 3 Software	
Predator	Nintendo Entertainment System	April 1989	Klon	
Prophecy	MS-DOS	April 1989	Activision	
Rampage	Amiga	April 1989	Monarch Development	
Rampage	Atari 2600	May 1989	BOBCO	
Ocean Ranger	MS-DOS	June 1989	Sher-Tek Software	
Apache Strike	MS-DOS	July 1989	FACS Entertainment Software	
Beyond Dark Castle	Amiga	October 1989	The Midnight Oil	
Beyond Dark Castle	Commodore 64	October 1989	Silicon Beach Software	
Galaxy Force	Master System	October 1989	Sega	
Ghostbusters II	MS-DOS	October 1989	Dynamix	
Ghostbusters II	Amiga	October 1989	Foursfield	
Ghostbusters II	Commodore 64	October 1989	Foursfield	
Grave Yardage	MS-DOS	October 1989	Incredible Technologies	
Stealth ATF	Nintendo Entertainment System	October 1989	Imagineering	
The Three Stooges	Nintendo Entertainment System	October 1989	Beam Software	
Tongue of the Fatman	MS-DOS	October 1989	Brian A. Rice	
Double Dragon	Atari 7800	November 1989	Imagineering	
Rampage	Atari 7800	November 1989	Spectral Dimensions	
Archon: The Light and the Dark	Nintendo Entertainment System	December 1989	Bullet-Proof Software	
Deathtrack	MS-DOS	December 1989	Dynamix	
Die Hard	MS-DOS	December 1989	Dynamix	
MechWarrior	MS-DOS	December 1989	Dynamix	
The Manhole	MS-DOS	December 1989	Activision	
Ghostbusters II	Amstrad CPC	December 1989	Foursfield	
Ghostbusters II	Atari ST	December 1989	Foursfield	
Ghostbusters II	MSX	December 1989	New Frontier	
Ghostbusters II	ZX Spectrum	December 1989	Foursfield	
After Burner II	Atari ST	1989	Argonaut Software	
Altered Beast	Amiga	1989	Software Studios	
Altered Beast	Amstrad CPC	1989	The Soft Option	
Altered Beast	Atari ST	1989	Software Studios	
Altered Beast	Commodore 64	1989	Software Studios	
Altered Beast	ZX Spectrum	1989	The Soft Option	
Apache Strike	Commodore 64	1989	FACS Entertainment Software	
Dynamite Düx	Amiga	1989	Core Design	
Dynamite Düx	Amstrad CPC	1989	Core Design	
Dynamite Düx	Atari ST	1989	Core Design	
Dynamite Düx	Commodore 64	1989	Core Design	
Dynamite Düx	ZX Spectrum	1989	Core Design	
Fighting Soccer	Amstrad CPC	1989	Sprytes	
Fighting Soccer	Atari ST	1989	Activision	
Fighting Soccer	Commodore 64	1989	Activision	
Fighting Soccer	ZX Spectrum	1989	Sprytes	
Power Drift	Amiga	1989	Sega	
Power Drift	Amstrad CPC	1989	Sega	
Power Drift	Atari ST	1989	Sega	
Power Drift	Commodore 64	1989	Sega	
Power Drift	MSX	1989	New Frontier	
Power Drift	ZX Spectrum	1989	Sega	
Predator	Amiga	1989	Software Studios	
Predator	TRS-80 CoCo	1989	SRB Software	
SDI: Strategic Defense Initiative	Amstrad CPC	1989	Software Studios	
The Real Ghostbusters	Commodore 64	1989	Mr. Micro	
The Real Ghostbusters	ZX Spectrum	1989	Mr. Micro	
Time Scanner	Amiga	1989	Foursfield	
Time Scanner	Amstrad CPC	1989	Spidersoft	
Time Scanner	Atari ST	1989	Foursfield	
Time Scanner	Commodore 64	1989	Spidersoft	
Time Scanner	MSX	1989	Spidersoft	
Time Scanner	ZX Spectrum	1989	Spidersoft	
Wonder Boy in Monster Land	Amiga	1989	Images Software	
Wonder Boy in Monster Land	Amstrad CPC	1989	Images Software	
Wonder Boy in Monster Land	Atari ST	1989	Images Software	
Wonder Boy in Monster Land	Commodore 64	1989	Images Software	
Wonder Boy in Monster Land	ZX Spectrum	1989	Images Software	
Ghostbusters II	Nintendo Entertainment System	April 1990	Imagineering	
Heavyweight Championship Boxing	Game Boy	September 1990	Tose	
Thunderbirds	Nintendo Entertainment System	September 1990	Pack-In-Video	
Ghostbusters II	Game Boy	December 1990	HAL Laboratory	
The Adventures of Rad Gravity	Nintendo Entertainment System	December 1990	Interplay Productions	
Die Hard	Commodore 64	1990	Silent Software	
Dragon Breed	Amiga	1990	Software Studios	
Dragon Breed	Amstrad CPC	1990	Activision	
Dragon Breed	Atari ST	1990	Software Studios	
Dragon Breed	Commodore 64	1990	Digital Design	
Dragon Breed	ZX Spectrum	1990	Activision	
F-14 Tomcat	MS-DOS	1990	Activision	
Fighting Soccer	Amiga	1990	SNK	
Grave Yardage	Commodore 64	1990	Incredible Technologies	
Hot Rod	Amiga	1990	Software Studios	
Hot Rod	Amstrad CPC	1990	Walking Circles	
Hot Rod	Atari ST	1990	Software Studios	
Hot Rod	Commodore 64	1990	Software Studios	
Hot Rod	ZX Spectrum	1990	Walking Circles	
Last Ninja 2: Back with a Vengeance	MS-DOS	1990	System 3 Software	
Malibu Beach Volleyball	Game Boy	1990	Tose	
Ninja Spirit	Amiga	1990	Images Software	
Ninja Spirit	Amstrad CPC	1990	Irem	
Ninja Spirit	Atari ST	1990	Images Software	
Ninja Spirit	Commodore 64	1990	Irem	
Ninja Spirit	ZX Spectrum	1990	Images Software	
Power Drift	MS-DOS	1990	Sega	
Shanghai II: Dragon's Eye	MS-DOS	1990	Activision	
Tongue of the Fatman	Commodore 64	1990	MindSpan	
Galaxy 5000	Nintendo Entertainment System	February 1991	Activision	
Tombs & Treasure	Nintendo Entertainment System	June 1991	Compile	
Beast Busters	Amiga	1991	Images Software	
Beast Busters	Atari ST	1991	Images Software	
Bush Buck: Global Treasure Hunter	Amiga	1991	PC Globe	
Deuteros: The Next Millennium	Amiga	1991	Activision	
Deuteros: The Next Millennium	Atari ST	1991	Activision	
Sargon V: World Class Chess	MS-DOS	March 1992	Activision	
Hunter	Amiga	1991	Activision	
Shanghai II: Dragon's Eye	Macintosh	1991	Activision	
Die Hard	Nintendo Entertainment System	January 1992	Pack-In-Video	
Sword Master	Nintendo Entertainment System	January 1992	Athena	
Ultimate Air Combat	Nintendo Entertainment System	April 1992	Activision	
Leather Goddesses of Phobos! 2	MS-DOS	1992	Infocom	
Rodney's Funscreen	MS-DOS	1992	Art in the Box	
Rodney's Funscreen	Windows	1992	Art in the Box	
Shanghai II: Dragon's Eye	Super Nintendo Entertainment System	1992	Genki	
The Manhole: New and Enhanced	MS-DOS	1992	Cyan Worlds	
The Manhole: New and Enhanced	Windows	1992	Cyan Worlds	
MechWarrior	Super Nintendo Entertainment System	May 1993	Beam Software, Victor Musical Industries	
Alien vs Predator	Super Nintendo Entertainment System	September 1993	Jorudan	
The Real Ghostbusters	Game Boy	October 1993	Kotobuki System	
Alien vs Predator: The Last of His Clan	Game Boy	November 1993	...	
BioMetal	Super Nintendo Entertainment System	November 1993	Athena	
Plok!	Super Nintendo Entertainment System	December 10, 1993	Software Creations	
Popeye 2	Game Boy	1993	Copya System	
Return to Zork	MS-DOS	September 15, 1993	Activision	
Return to Zork	Macintosh	September 15, 1993	Activision	
Simon the Sorcerer	MS-DOS	September 27, 1993	Adventuresoft	
Pitfall: The Mayan Adventure	Super Nintendo Entertainment System	November 1994	Redline Games	
Shanghai: Triple-Threat	3DO	December 13, 1994	Activision	
Pitfall: The Mayan Adventure	Sega CD	November 1994	Activision	
Pitfall: The Mayan Adventure	Sega Genesis	November 1994	Activision	
Radical Rex	Sega CD	October 1994	Beam Software	
Radical Rex	Sega Genesis	October 1994	Beam Software	
Radical Rex	Super Nintendo Entertainment System	October 1994	Beam Software	
Richard Scarry's Best Neighborhood Disc Ever!	MS-DOS	1994	Quicksilver Software	
Richard Scarry's Busiest Neighborhood Disc Ever!	MS-DOS	1994	Philips Sidewalk Studio	
Sargon V: World Class Chess	Macintosh	June 1995	Activision	
Shanghai II: Dragon's Eye	Sega Genesis	1994	Activision	
X-Kaliber 2097	Super Nintendo Entertainment System	February 1994	Fupac / Opus	
MechWarrior 2: 31st Century Combat	MS-DOS	July 24, 1995	Activision	
Pitfall: The Mayan Adventure	Windows	August 1995	Kinesoft	
BattleTech: A Game of Armored Combat	Super Nintendo Entertainment System	October 1995	Tiburon Entertainment	
Earthworm Jim	MS-DOS	November 30, 1995	Shiny Entertainment	
MechWarrior 2: 31st Century Combat	Windows	December 1995	Activision	
Paparazzi!: Tales of Tinseltown	Macintosh	1995	Museworthy	
Paparazzi!: Tales of Tinseltown	Windows	1995	Museworthy	
Pitfall: The Mayan Adventure	Jaguar	October 17, 1995	Imagitec Design	
Pitfall: The Mayan Adventure	32X	October 1995	Zombie Studios, Big Bang Software	
Shanghai II: Dragon's Eye	Windows	1995	Activision	
Shanghai: Great Moments	Macintosh	November 1995	Quicksilver Software	
Shanghai: Great Moments	Windows	March 1995	Quicksilver Software	
Shanghai: Triple-Threat	Saturn	1995	Success	
Spycraft: The Great Game	Windows	February 29, 1996	Activision	
MechWarrior 2: Ghost Bear's Legacy	MS-DOS	June 30, 1996	Activision	
MechWarrior 2: Ghost Bear's Legacy	Windows	June 30, 1996	Activision	
MechWarrior 2: 31st Century Combat	Macintosh	July 1996	Activision	
Santa Fe Mysteries: The Elk Moon Murder	Windows	July 1996	Activision	
Muppet Treasure Island	Macintosh	September 1, 1996	Activision	
Muppet Treasure Island	Windows	September 1, 1996	Activision	
Time Commando	PlayStation	September 30, 1996	Adeline Software International	
MechWarrior 2: Mercenaries	MS-DOS	September 1996	Activision	
MechWarrior 2: Mercenaries	Windows	September 1996	Activision	
Blast Chamber	PlayStation	October 26, 1996	Attention to Detail	
Power Move Pro Wrestling	PlayStation	November 14, 1996	Yuke's	
A-10 Cuba!	Windows	November 30, 1996	Parsoft Interactive	
HyperBlade	Windows	December 12, 1996	WizBang! Software Productions / Activision	
Blast Chamber	Saturn	1996	Attention to Detail	
Santa Fe Mysteries: The Elk Moon Murder	MS-DOS	1996	Activision	
Santa Fe Mysteries: The Elk Moon Murder	Macintosh	1996	Activision	
Spycraft: The Great Game	MS-DOS	1996	Activision	
Spycraft: The Great Game	Macintosh	1996	Activision	
Time Commando	MS-DOS	1996	Adeline Software International	
Time Commando	Windows	1996	Adeline Software International	
Zork Nemesis: The Forbidden Lands	MS-DOS	1996	Zombie Studios	
Zork Nemesis: The Forbidden Lands	Macintosh	1996	Quicksilver Software	
Zork Nemesis: The Forbidden Lands	Windows	1996	Zombie Studios	
Interstate '76	Windows	March 28, 1997	Activision	
MechWarrior 2: 31st Century Combat	PlayStation	March 1997	Quantum Factory	
Twinsen's Odyssey	MS-DOS	June 1, 1997	Adeline Software International	
Twinsen's Odyssey	Windows	June 1, 1997	Adeline Software International	
Blood Omen: Legacy of Kain	Windows	August 1997	Semi Logic Entertainments	
Hexen II	Windows	September 11, 1997	Raven Software	
Dark Reign: The Future of War	Windows	September 17, 1997	Auran Games	
Nightmare Creatures	PlayStation	October 1, 1997	Kalisto Entertainment	
Zork: Grand Inquisitor	Windows	November 4, 1997	Activision	
Heavy Gear	Windows	November 25, 1997	Activision	
NetStorm: Islands at War	Windows	November 1997	Titanic Entertainment	
Quake II	Windows	December 9, 1997	Id Software	
Grand Tour Racing '98	PlayStation	1997	Eutechnyx	
MechWarrior 2: 31st Century Combat	Saturn	1997	Quantum Factory	
Nightmare Creatures	Windows	December 11, 1997	Kalisto Entertainment	
Santa Fe Mysteries: Sacred Ground	MS-DOS	1997	Activision	
Santa Fe Mysteries: Sacred Ground	Macintosh	1997	Activision	
Santa Fe Mysteries: Sacred Ground	Windows	1997	Activision	
Shanghai: Dynasty	Macintosh	1997	Quicksilver Software	
Shanghai: Dynasty	Windows	1997	Quicksilver Software	
Battlezone	Windows	February 28, 1998	Activision	
Pitfall 3D: Beyond the Jungle	PlayStation	February 28, 1998	Activision	
Hexen II: Mission Pack - Portal of Praevus	Windows	March 31, 1998	Raven Software	
Dark Reign: Rise of the Shadowhand	Windows	March 1998	Activision	
Judge Dredd	PlayStation	April 8, 1998	Gremlin Interactive	
Vigilante 8	PlayStation	June 4, 1998	Luxoflux	
Tenchu: Stealth Assassins	PlayStation	September 1998	Acquire	
The Fifth Element	PlayStation	October 1, 1998	Kalisto Entertainment	
Asteroids	PlayStation	October 31, 1998	Syrox Developments	
Barrage	Windows	October 1998	Mango Grits	
SiN	Windows	November 12, 1998	Ritual Entertainment	
Apocalypse	PlayStation	November 18, 1998	Neversoft	
Asteroids	Windows	November 20, 1998	Syrox Developments	
Heretic II	Windows	November 24, 1998	Raven Software	
Nightmare Creatures	Nintendo 64	November 1998	Kalisto Entertainment	
Shanghai Pocket	Game Boy Color	December 30, 1998	Sun Corporation	
Remington Top Shot: Interactive Target Shooting	Windows	1998	Logicware	
Remington Top Shot: Interactive Target Shooting	Macintosh	October 26, 1998	Logicware	
Guardian's Crusade	PlayStation	January 31, 1999	Tamsoft	
Sid Meier's Civilization II	PlayStation	January 1999	LTI Gray Matter	
Fighter Squadron: The Screamin' Demons over Europe	Windows	March 1, 1999	Parsoft Interactive	
Vigilante 8	Nintendo 64	March 17, 1999	Luxoflux	
Jack Nicklaus 6: Golden Bear Challenge	Windows	March 31, 1999	Hypnos Entertainment	
Civilization: Call to Power	Windows	April 1999	Activision	
Extreme Boards & Blades	Windows	May 19, 1999	Silverfish Studios	
A Bug's Life	Nintendo 64	May 26, 1999	Traveller's Tales	
Sin Mission Pack: Wages of Sin	Windows	June 1, 1999	2015	
Toy Story 2: Buzz Lightyear to the Rescue!	PlayStation	June 1, 1999	Traveller's Tales	
Heavy Gear II	Windows	June 23, 1999	Activision	
Quake II	Nintendo 64	June 30, 1999	Raster Productions	
Quake II	Macintosh	July 1999	Logicware	
Blue Stinger	Dreamcast	September 7, 1999	Climax Studios	
Tony Hawk's Pro Skater	PlayStation	September 29, 1999	Neversoft	
Quake II	PlayStation	October 5, 1999	HammerHead	
Space Invaders	Windows	October 1999	Z-Axis	
Space Invaders	PlayStation	October 1999	Z-Axis	
Toy Story 2: Buzz Lightyear to the Rescue!	Nintendo 64	November 17, 1999	Traveller's Tales	
Interstate '82	Windows	November 23, 1999	Activision	
Space Invaders	Nintendo 64	November 30, 1999	Z-Axis	
Star Trek: Hidden Evil	Windows	November 1999	Presto Studios	
Quake III: Arena	Windows	December 2, 1999	Id Software	
Heretic II	Linux	December 3, 1999	Loki Entertainment	
Vigilante 8: 2nd Offense	PlayStation	December 16, 1999	Luxoflux	
Vigilante 8: 2nd Offense	Nintendo 64	December 28, 1999	Luxoflux	
Battlezone II: Combat Commander	Windows	December 30, 1999	Pandemic Studios	
Quake III: Arena	Linux	December 10, 1999	Id Software	
Quake III: Arena	Macintosh	December 10, 1999	Id Software	
Shanghai: Second Dynasty	Macintosh	December 1999	Quicksilver Software	
Shanghai: Second Dynasty	Windows	December 1999	Quicksilver Software	
Asteroids	Game Boy Color	1999	Syrox Developments	
Disney's Tarzan	Game Boy Color	June 28, 1999	Digital Eclipse	
Shanghai: Mah-Jongg Essentials	Macintosh	1999	Activision	
Shanghai: Mah-Jongg Essentials	Windows	1999	Activision	
Space Invaders	Game Boy Color	1999	Crawfish Interactive	
T'ai Fu: Wrath of the Tiger	PlayStation	March 26, 1999	DreamWorks Interactive	
Wu-Tang: Shaolin Style	PlayStation	December 2, 1999	Paradox Development	
