= List of Atari 5200 games =

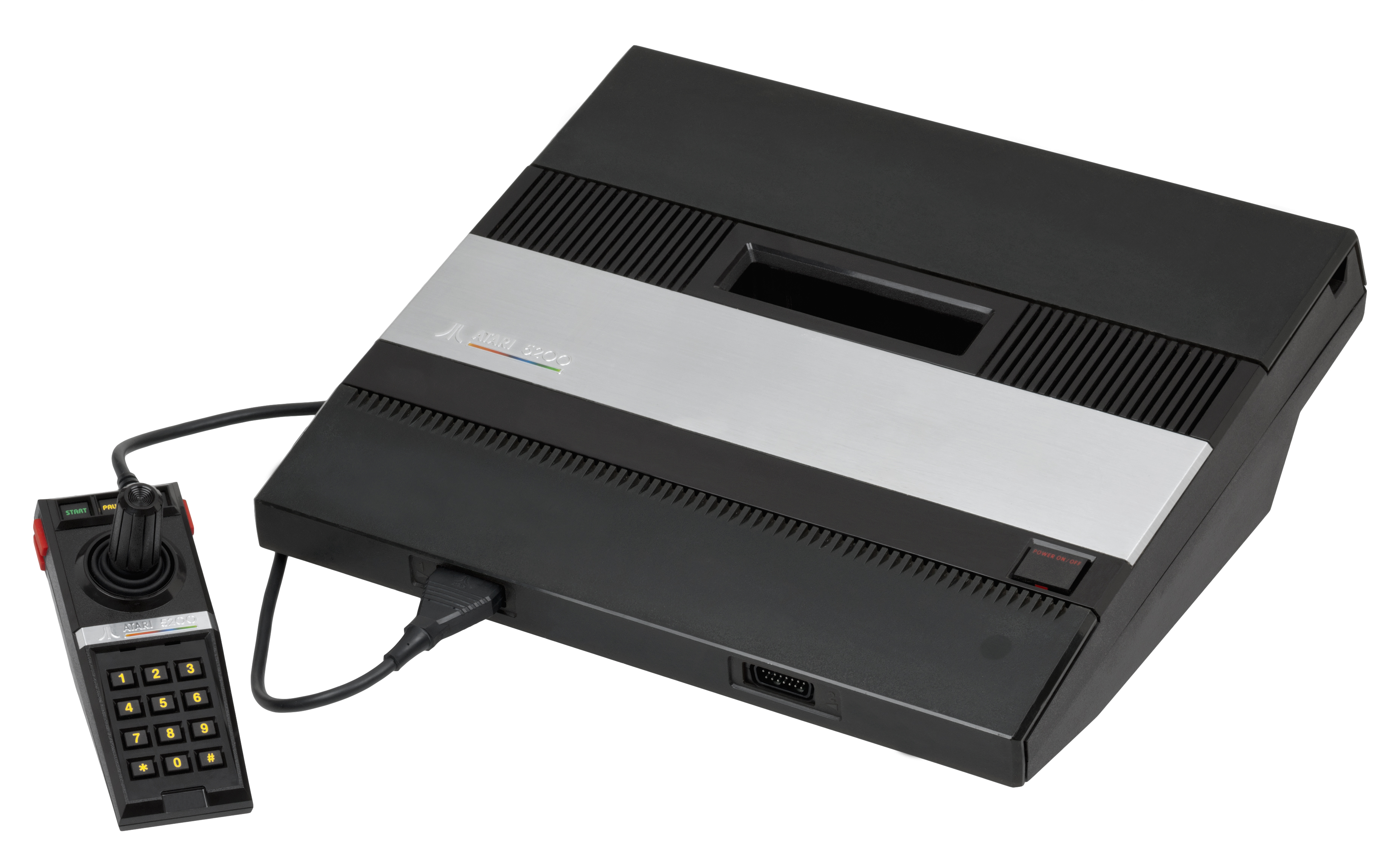
The Atari 5200

The Atari 5200 is a home video game console released in October 1982. Marketed as a successor to the Atari 2600, internally the console is almost identical to Atari's 8-bit computer architecture released 3 years earlier. The console was a commercial failure and was discontinued after less than 2 years on the market. In total, 69 (Note: This number is always up to date by this script) games were officially released for the Atari 5200. The vast majority of these titles were also released on other platforms, especially the Atari 2600 and Atari 8-bit computers. 54 of the games on this list were also released for the Atari 2600. The last game released by Atari for the system was Gremlins in 1986. This list contains only commercially released games developed by non-hobbyists.

Originally released for	Description	Count
Arcades	Initially released as an arcade machine	35
Home Consoles	Initially released on any home console	21
Home Computers	Initially or simultaneously released for home computers	13
Total		69

== Games ==
Title	Developer	Publisher	Release Date	Also available on			Ref.
Title	Developer	Publisher	Release Date	2600	INTV	CV	Ref.
The Activision Decathlon	Activision	Activision	August 1984	Yes	No	Yes	
Astro Chase	First Star Software	Parker Brothers	October 1983	No	No	No	
Ballblazer	Lucasfilm Games	Atari Corp.	1986	No	No	No	
Beamrider	Action Graphics	Activision	October 1984	Yes	Yes	Yes	
Berzerk	GCC	Atari, Inc.	February 1984	Yes	No	No	
Blue Print	Solitaire Group	CBS Electronics	October 1983	Yes	No	No	
Bounty Bob Strikes Back!	Big Five Software	Big Five Software	April 1985	No	No	No	
Buck Rogers: Planet of Zoom	Sega	Sega	November 1983	Yes	No	Yes	
Centipede	Atari, Inc.	Atari, Inc.	February 1983	Yes	Yes	Yes	
Choplifter	GCC	Atari, Inc.	May 1984	No	No	Yes	
Congo Bongo	Sega	Sega	December 1983	Yes	Yes	Yes	
Countermeasure	Atari, Inc.	Atari, Inc.	February 1983	No	No	No	
Defender	Atari, Inc.	Atari, Inc.	December 1982	Yes	Yes	Yes	
Dig Dug	GCC	Atari, Inc.	October 1983	Yes	No	No	
The Dreadnaught Factor	Activision	Activision	May 1984	No	Yes	No	
Frogger	Parker Brothers	Parker Brothers	June 1983	Yes	Yes	Yes	
Frogger II: ThreeeDeep!	Parker Brothers	Parker Brothers	September 1984	Yes	No	Yes	
Galaxian	Atari, Inc.	Atari, Inc.	October 1982	Yes	No	Yes	
Gorf	Roklan Corporation	CBS Electronics	October 1983	Yes	Yes	Yes	
Gremlins	Atari, Inc.	Atari Corp.	1986	No	No	No	
Gyruss	Parker Brothers	Parker Brothers	June 1984	Yes	No	Yes	
H.E.R.O.	Activision	Activision	August 1984	Yes	No	Yes	
James Bond 007	Parker Brothers	Parker Brothers	May 1984	Yes	No	Yes	
Joust	GCC	Atari, Inc.	October 1983	Yes	No	No	
Jungle Hunt	Atari, Inc.	Atari, Inc.	September 1983	Yes	No	Yes	
K-Razy Shoot-Out	K-Byte	CBS Electronics	October 1983	No	No	No	
Kaboom!	Activision	Activision	November 1983	Yes	No	No	
Kangaroo	GCC	Atari, Inc.	August 1983	Yes	No	No	
Keystone Kapers	Activision	Activision	June 1984	Yes	No	Yes	
Mario Bros.	Atari, Inc.	Atari, Inc.	February 1984	Yes	No	No	
Megamania	Activision	Activision	February 1984	Yes	No	No	
Meteorites	Electra Concepts	Electra Concepts	July 1984	No	No	No	
Miner 2049er	Big Five Software	Big Five Software	July 1983	Yes	No	Yes	
Missile Command	Atari, Inc.	Atari, Inc.	October 1982	Yes	No	No	
Montezuma's Revenge	Parker Brothers	Parker Brothers	September 1984	Yes	No	Yes	
Moon Patrol	Atari, Inc.	Atari, Inc.	December 1983	Yes	No	No	
Mountain King	K-Byte	CBS Electronics	October 1983	Yes	No	Yes	
Mr. Do's Castle	Parker Brothers	Parker Brothers	October 1984	Yes	No	Yes	
Ms. Pac-Man	GCC	Atari, Inc.	September 1983	Yes	No	No	
Pac-Man	Atari, Inc.	Atari, Inc.	November 1982	Yes	Yes	No	
Pengo	Atari, Inc.	Atari, Inc.	December 1983	Yes	No	No	
Pitfall!	Beck-Tech	Activision	March 1984	Yes	Yes	Yes	
Pitfall II: Lost Caverns	Activision	Activision	September 1984	Yes	No	Yes	
Pole Position	GCC	Atari, Inc.	September 1983	Yes	No	No	
Popeye	Parker Brothers	Parker Brothers	November 1983	Yes	Yes	Yes	
Q*bert	Parker Brothers	Parker Brothers	October 1983	Yes	Yes	Yes	
Qix	GCC	Atari, Inc.	March 1983	No	No	No	
Quest for Quintana Roo	VSS, Inc.	Sunrise Software, Inc.	December 1984	Yes	No	Yes	
RealSports Baseball	Atari, Inc.	Atari, Inc.	October 1983	Yes	No	No	
RealSports Football	Atari, Inc.	Atari, Inc.	December 1982	Yes	No	No	
RealSports Soccer	Atari, Inc.	Atari, Inc.	November 1982	Yes	No	No	
RealSports Tennis	Atari, Inc.	Atari, Inc.	April 1983	Yes	No	No	
Rescue on Fractalus!	Lucasfilm Games	Atari Corp.	1986	No	No	No	
River Raid	Activision	Activision	November 1983	Yes	Yes	Yes	
Robotron: 2084	Atari, Inc.	Atari, Inc.	March 1984	No	No	No	
Space Dungeon	Atari, Inc.	Atari, Inc.	September 1983	No	No	No	
Space Invaders	Atari, Inc.	Atari, Inc.	October 1982	Yes	No	No	
Space Shuttle: A Journey into Space	Activision	Activision	October 1984	Yes	Yes	No	
Star Raiders	Atari, Inc.	Atari, Inc.	October 1982	Yes	No	No	
Star Trek: Strategic Operations Simulator	Sega	Sega	October 1983	Yes	No	No	
Star Wars: Return of the Jedi Death Star Battle	Parker Brothers	Parker Brothers	February 1984	Yes	No	No	
Star Wars: The Arcade Game	Parker Brothers	Parker Brothers	June 1984	Yes	No	Yes	
Super Breakout (Note: Included as initial pack-in title)	Atari, Inc.	Atari, Inc.	October 1982	Yes	No	No	
Super Cobra	Roklan Corporation	Parker Brothers	May 1984	Yes	Yes	Yes	
Vanguard	GCC	Atari, Inc.	October 1983	Yes	No	No	
Wizard of Wor	Roklan Corporation	CBS Electronics	October 1983	Yes	No	No	
Zaxxon	Sega	Sega	August 1984	Yes	Yes	Yes	
Zenji	Activision	Activision	October 1984	No	No	Yes	
Zone Ranger	Activision	Activision	October 1984	No	No	No	

== Unreleased Games ==
Title	Publisher	Planned Release Date	Notes
Asteroids	Atari, Inc.	October 1982	Initially planned as a launch title.
Barroom Baseball	Atari, Inc.	1983	Alternate version of RealSports Baseball meant to be sold as a coin-op experience in bars.
Battlezone	Atari, Inc.	December 1983	Released for Atari 8-bit computers and the Atari 2600.
Bristles	First Star Software	December 1983	Released for Atari 8-bit computers. An official conversion for the 5200 was released as a limited run during Classic Gaming Expo 2004.
Domino Man	CBS Electronics	First Quarter 1984	Licensed by Bally Midway.
Fathom	Imagic	November 1983	Released for the Atari 2600
Final Legacy	Atari, Inc.	Third Quarter 1984	Released for Atari 8-bit computers.
Flip and Flop	First Star Software	Third Quarter 1984	Released for Atari 8-bit computers.
Jawbreaker	Sierra On-Line	June 1984	Released for Atari 8-bit computers and the Atari 2600.
Laser Gates	Imagic	December 1983	Released for the Atari 2600.
Madden Football	CBS Electronics	December 1983	
Millipede	Atari, Inc.	Third Quarter 1984	Released for Atari 8-bit computers and the Atari 2600.
Pastfinder	Activision	Fourth Quarter 1984	Released for Atari 8-bit computers.
Polaris	Tigervision	November 1983	Licensed by Taito. Released for the Atari 2600.
Quick Step	Imagic	November 1983	Released for the Atari 2600.
RealSports Basketball	Atari, Inc.	1983	
Road Runner	Atari, Inc.	First Quarter 1984	Unrelated to the 1985 arcade game of the same name.
Satan's Hollow	CBS Electronics	First Quarter 1984	Licensed by Bally Midway.
Scraper Caper	Big Five Software	Third Quarter 1984	
Serpentine	Broderbund	October 1983	Released for Atari 8-bit computers.
Solar Fox	CBS Electronics	December 1983	Licensed by Bally Midway. Released for the Atari 2600.
Sport Goofy	Atari, Inc.	First Quarter 1984	
Springer	Tigervision	August 1983	Released for the Atari 2600.
Tac-Scan	Sega	September 1983	Released for the Atari 2600.
Tempest	Atari, Inc.	August 1984	
Toy Bizarre	Activision	December 1984	
Track & Field	Atari, Inc.	August 1984	Licensed by Konami.
Tutankham	Parker Brothers	Fourth Quarter 1984	Licensed by Konami. Released for the Atari 2600.
Warp Wars	Activision	Second Quarter 1984	
Wing War	Imagic	November 1983	Released for the Atari 2600.
Wings	CBS Electronics	First Quarter 1984	
Xevious	Atari, Inc.	March 1984	Licensed by Namco.

== See also ==
- List of Atari 2600 games
- List of Atari 7800 games
- Lists of video games
