= Countermeasure (disambiguation) =

Countermeasure is a measure or action taken to counter or offset another one.

Countermeasure may also refer to:

- Countermeasure (computer), a process in information security or cyberspace security
- Countermeasure, a 1974 Soviet film
- Countermeasure, a 1983 Atari 5200 video game
