= Borrowed Time (video game) =

1985 video game

- Developer: Interplay
- Publishers: Activision; Mastertronic
- Producer: Richard Lehrberg
- Designers: Brian Fargo; Michael Cranford
- Programmers: Ayman Adham; Jay Patel; Troy P. Worrell; Rebecca Heineman
- Artists: David Lowery; Curt Toumanian; Greg Miller
- Platforms: Amiga, Apple II, Atari ST, Commodore 64, IBM PC, Mac
- Release: 1985: Apple II, C64, IBM PC, Mac; 1986: Amiga, Atari ST
- Genre: Interactive fiction
- Mode: Single-player

Borrowed Time is an interactive fiction game about a detective, who tries to rescue his kidnapped wife. The game was developed by Interplay and published by Activision in 1985. Mastertronic republished it as a budget title as Time to Die.

== Plot ==
Written by Arnie Katz and Bill Kunkel, the plot in the style of a detective story of the noir crime genre is set in the USA of the 1930s. The player takes a role of a private detective, Sam Harlow. His ex-wife Rita Sweeney has been kidnapped, and he tries to free her. In the process, he is pursued by gangsters who are after his life.

== Gameplay ==
Gameplay screenshot (Atari ST)

Borrowed Time is a text adventure with a complementary graphical user interface. Control is via the keyboard, alternatively, many commands and objects can be selected from a graphical menu with a joystick or a mouse. Moving around is done in the same way - a selection window with cardinal directions is available. The player must interrogate suspects and collect evidence at the various locations in order to achieve the game goal. Some game actions have a time limit for problem-solving.

== Development ==
Borrowed Time was produced by Interplay for Activision and was part of a $100,000 contract that included a total of three adventure games. Interplay founder Fargo already had experience in the adventure genre: his first game was the adventure The Demon's Forge, released for Apple II in 1981. The parser used by Interplay was developed by Fargo and a collaborator, and at one stage of development had a dictionary of 250 nouns, 200 verbs, and could evaluate input with prepositions and indirect objects. The same engine had been used in the previous games Mindshadow and The Tracer Sanction. The writing and much of the game design were done by Subway Software, a company founded by game journalist Bill Kunkel specifically for Borrowed Time. Fargo outsourced the writing because he felt that no one at Interplay could produce quality prose.

== Reception ==
Info rated Borrowed Time four stars out of five, describing it as "a big step forward in the realm of 'interactive entertainment' ... a tonic to jaded adventurers", and praising the game's graphics, parser, and humor. Ahoy! said that the game had "more plot turns and twists than a backwoods mountain road", with "unusually good" writing and graphics "chock full of cute touches". The magazine stated that if the word menus were more complete, "the game would be better than an all-night Agatha Christie reading!". Compute! wrote that "Activision has created a delightful game environment with the look and feel of those classic hardboiled detective movies and novels". Computer Gaming World's Charles Ardai called Borrowed Time "a superbly cinematic graphic adventure" that was too brief and deserved a sequel. A German reviewer recognized the challenging storyline, the detailed graphics and the comfortable gameplay. He gave Borrowed Time 82 out of 100.
