= The Great American Cross-Country Road Race =

1985 video game

- Developer: Activision
- Publisher: Activision
- Designer: Alex DeMeo
- Platforms: Atari 8-bit, Apple II, Commodore 64
- Release: 1985
- Genre: Racing
- Mode: Single-player

The Great American Cross-Country Road Race (UK re-release title: American Road Race) is a racing video game written by Alex DeMeo for Atari 8-bit computers and published by Activision in 1985. It was ported to the Apple II and Commodore 64. The game is in part an adaptation of an earlier Activision game, Enduro, created for the Atari 2600 console, but with design, graphics and sound expanded to fit the capabilities of the more powerful computers.

== Gameplay ==
Next city ahead

The game puts the player in the position of a driver of a high-performance car, racing across the United States while passing through its major cities. Obstacles include weather, road conditions, limited fuel, and the highway patrol. The changing time of day affects gameplay, because the other cars drive faster at night.

Players are given the option of choosing their routes from city to city, allowing them to, for example, take a northern route through the snowy Midwest. Every route has its own scoreboard for the top ten fastest times to complete each route.

== Development ==
The Great American Cross-Country Road Race was designed by Alex DeMeo, who had been inspired by the film The Gumball Rally. DeMeo programmed the original version of Road Race on an Atari 800 including sound, music and some graphics. The game's title sequence was based on an introduction screen of another Activision video game Master of the Lamps.

== Reception ==
Reception

Review scores
Publication	Score
Zzap!	77%
Info	3/5

"After further playing I found this was in fact a good little road race", wrote Julian Rignall in the September 1985 issue of Zzap!64 . Info rated the game three stars out of five, stating that it "feels pretty familiar" with "pretty standard" graphics and sound, and comparing it to Turbo.

== See also ==
- Baja Buggies
