= Masterblazer =

1990 video game

- Amiga cover art
- Developer(s): Rainbow Arts
- Publisher(s): Lucasfilm Games
- Designer(s): Gero Presser
- Composer(s): Chris Hülsbeck; Jochen Hippel (ST)
- Platform(s): Amiga, Atari ST, MS-DOS
- Release: 1990
- Genre(s): Action
- Mode(s): Single-player

Masterblazer is a video game developed by Rainbow Arts and published by Lucasfilm Games in 1990 for the Amiga, Atari ST, and MS-DOS. It is the sequel to the 1985 game Ballblazer.

Masterblazer presentes a futuristic sport where the playing field is a large rectangle made of squares. A Plasmorb ball must be moved into a goal as many times as possible within the course of three minutes. This is accomplished by using a Rotofoil vehicle. Unlike its predecessor, the game features a tournament mode which allows up to 8 players to compete for the Master Blazer prize. This game also allows Rotofoils to race against each other (basically a normal game but without the ball).
