= Enduro (video game) =

1983 video game

- Atari 2600 box art
- Developer: Activision
- Publisher: Activision
- Designer: Larry Miller
- Platforms: Atari 2600, ZX Spectrum
- Release: Atari 2600; May 1983
- Genre: Racing
- Mode: Single-player

Enduro is a racing video game designed by Larry Miller for the Atari 2600 and published by Activision in 1983. The object of the game is to complete an endurance race, passing a certain number of cars each day to continue the next day. The visuals change from day to night, and there is occasional inclement weather.

Miller previously wrote games for Apple computers and the Atari 2600, such as Spider Fighter for Activision. Influenced by his own experience of driving through California, Miller made the game in about three months with 100-hour weeks.

Enduro was released for the Atari 2600 in May 1983 and later ported to the ZX Spectrum. It became the top-selling console game of the month by June 1983 and received positive reviews from publications like The Video Game Update and Games, with both contemporary and retrospective reviews referring to it as the best racing game on the Atari 2600.

== Gameplay ==
Gameplay screenshot

Enduro consists of maneuvering a race car in the National Enduro, a long-distance endurance race. The object of the race is to pass a certain number of cars each day. Doing so will allow the player to continue racing for the next day. The driver must avoid other racers and pass 200 cars on the first day, and 300 cars with each following day.

As the time in the game passes, visibility changes as well. When it is night in the game the player can only see the taillights of cars ahead. As the days progress, cars will become more difficult to avoid as well. Weather and time of day are factors in how to play. During the day the player may drive through an icy patch on the road which would limit control of the vehicle, or a patch of fog may reduce visibility.

If a player succeeds in racing five days or more, an on-screen racing trophy pops up. At the time of release, if the player sent a photograph of this achievement to Activision, they received a patch declaring them an "Activision Roadbuster".

== Production ==
Prior to designing Enduro, Miller had previously developed games for Apple computers as well as Spider Fighter for the Atari 2600 while working for Activision. On speaking of the difference between the two, he focused on the Atari 2600 as he said that his games are "very fast-action [...] I couldn't do that for Apple because the action is severely limited. You can get more detail on the screen, but not the really fast action."

Miller described his game design progress as having a game brewing in his mind until he started to think how the game should look and what is available on the machine before developing an outline. This is followed by about a month of getting the nuts and bolts of writing computer code. Miller was influenced to make Enduro as he does a lot of driving in California through fog, sunny weather snow and ice and wanted to make what he described as a "realistic driving game."

Enduro was developed entirely on an Apple computer and coded entirely in assembly language in about three months with 100-hour weeks. The game has a four-kilobyte ROM chip. Miller said there were very serious limitations he could have in graphics, which led to a lot of trade-offs. He opted to put in imagery he believed would be most pleasing such as the road curving, mountains in the distance. Miller said "it was extremely difficult to put those in and it just wasn't possible to put anything else in".

The game was later ported the ZX Spectrum by James Software.

== Release ==
Enduro was released in May 1983 for the Atari 2600. In June 1983, it was the top-selling video game of the month by June 1983. By August 1983, it was the 10th highest-selling video game of the month.

Enduro has been re-released in various compilation packs, including the Atari 2600 Action Pack 2 for IBM-compatible PCs, and Activision Anthology (2002). Enduro is also included as secret game within Call of Duty: Black Ops Cold War (2020).

In 1983, Activision ran the "Enduro Race-For-Riches Sweepstakes". The grand prize was a Datsun 280ZX pace car and a trip for two to Caesars Palace Grand Prix Weekend. The second prize was a Datsun 200SX Hatchback SL, the third prize was a trip for two to Caesars Palace Grand Prix Weekend, the fourth prize was one of 50 radio-controlled cars, the fifth prize was one of 500 Activision Grand Prix video game cartridges, and the sixth prize was one of 2,000 Datsun Racing posters.

== Reception ==
From contemporary reviews, an anonymous reviewer in The Video Game Update described it as an "extremely impressive auto racing game. It's one of those rare games that elicited comments from our staff like 'Wow – this is incredible!'" The review complimented its addicting gameplay and that the game was "far superior to existing race games for the 2600 because it makes you part of the action". Michael Blanchet stated they generally disliked sports and racing games, but said "after playing Enduro, I'm ready to alter my opinion". Blanchet found it comparable to the ColecoVision game Turbo, appreciating the game took place on a track that curves and bends opposed to a straight road. Blanchet concluded that the game was "the best [Atari 2600] driving game I've seen yet – bar none". A review in Games echoed these statements, calling it a remarkable driving game and an "outstanding achievement for this system". The review noted the realistic graphics and sound combined created a realistic illusion of depth and speed and that, "overall, Enduro is exhausting but exhilarating". Reviewing the ZX Spectrum version, a reviewer in Crash noted the graphics were not overly detailed, but had a better than average 3D effect. They concluded that Enduro was one of Activision's better games, but on the Spectrum it was better than Speed Duel but not as strong as Full Throttle.

Enduro received the award for "1984 Best Sports Videogame" at the 5th annual Arkie Awards where the judges praised it for "featur[ing] some of the best graphics presented by a 2600 and boast[ing] an intriguing concept". Computer and Video Games reviewed the game in 1989, giving it a 77% score.

From retrospective reviews, Brett Weiss in his book Classic Home Video Games 1972–1984 complimented the game, describing it as remarkable racing game, noting its variety, suspense and graphic sophistication. Weiss found it superior to games like Pole Position, noting it was more involved and atmospheric, noting the day to night scenes in the game. In their list of the top 25 Atari 2600 games, Stuart Hunt and Darran Jones listed Enduro in at their 21st spot in Retro Gamer. The writers found the graphics average, but that it was the entertaining gameplay that made the Activision racer so special, and that the game is "arguably the 2600's best racer".

== Legacy ==
In 1985 Activision released The Great American Cross-Country Road Race, a home computer game that is based on the design of Enduro, but with enhanced visuals, audio, and some additional gameplay elements.

== See also ==
- List of Atari 2600 games
- List of Activision games: 1980–1999
- Grand Prix
