= Ghostbusters II (computer video game) =

1989 video game

- Developers: Dynamix (MS-DOS); Foursfield (Amiga, C64, ST, CPC, Spectrum); New Frontier (MSX)
- Publishers: Activision; MCM Software (MSX, Spain-only)
- Designer: Doug Barnett (MS-DOS)
- Programmers: Colin Reed (Amiga, ST); Paul Baker (C64 Amiga, Atari ST); Oliver Twins (CPC, Spectrum)
- Series: Ghostbusters
- Platforms: Atari ST; Amstrad CPC; Amiga; Commodore 64; MS-DOS; ZX Spectrum; MSX
- Release: 1989
- Genre: Action
- Mode: Single-player

Ghostbusters II is an action game based on the film of the same name. It was published in 1989 by Activision for multiple computer platforms. British studio Foursfield developed a version for Commodore 64, Amiga, Atari ST, Amstrad CPC, and ZX Spectrum. It was converted to MSX by New Frontier. The game includes three levels based on scenes from the film. Dynamix developed a separate version for MS-DOS, also based on the film. In North America, Ghostbusters II was only released for Amiga, Commodore 64, an MS-DOS.

The non-DOS versions were praised for the graphics and audio, but criticized for long loading times, disk swapping, and the final level.

== Gameplay ==
Ghostbusters II follows the plot of the film, in which the spirit of Vigo the Carpathian intends to enter the Earth world and take it over, by inhabiting the body of Oscar Barrett, the baby son of Dana Barrett. The player controls the Ghostbusters team as they try to stop Vigo.

The MS-DOS version of the game begins with the Ghostbusters battling the ghosts of the Scoleri brothers in a courtroom, as in the film. Subsequently, the player can choose to do various activities, which include hunting for ghosts to earn money. Three ghost-plagued locations can be played: Central Park, Northrones Department Store, and the Docks. In each location, the player blasts ghosts until they become trapped. The player must avoid slimeballs and fireballs thrown by the ghosts. The player can also collect slime samples from an abandoned underground train tunnel, but must avoid Slimer ghosts in the process. The collected slime is then tested with the use of a CD player. The slime is placed in a beaker and the player selects a song from the CD player; nine songs are available to choose from, and the player must select three calming songs to stabilize the slime. If the player chooses incorrectly, the slime explodes out of the beaker and the player must return to the train station to retrieve more slime. If the player loses a ghostbusting job or the slime challenge, then the player's Ghostbuster is sent to the Parkview mental ward. As one of the other Ghostbusters, the player can choose to rescue the institutionalized character from the ward. The player must earn $55,000 to take control of the Statue of Liberty, which is used to reach an art museum, where the Ghostbusters battle Vigo.

The other computer versions (Commodore 64, Amiga, Atari ST, Amstrad CPC, ZX Spectrum, MSX) have three distinct levels based on scenes from the film. In the first level, Ray Stantz is lowered into a subway tunnel to collect slime, while using three different weapons to deter various spirits. The player swings back and forth while descending the tunnel to collect the slime.The player has a courage meter which depletes if ghosts attack the player character, thereby scaring him. A life is lost if the meter is drained completely. The second level is a side-scrolling shoot 'em up in which the Statue of Liberty walks along Broadway in New York. The player uses the statue's lit torch to shoot fireballs at oncoming ghosts, turning them into slime. The player also controls pedestrians who retrieve the slime in order to keep the torch lit. The third level is viewed from an isometric view, and begins with the Ghostbusters trying to safely slide down a rope to land inside the art museum. The player then alternates between the four Ghostbusters as they rescue Oscar and defeat Vigo.

== Development and release ==
The DOS version, designed by Doug Barnett and developed by Dynamix, includes digitized voice tracks and images from the film, while the other versions, developed by Foursfield, include only the images. The Amiga version is divided among three different disks, while the Atari ST version was released as a four-disk game; this requires the player to swap disks at certain points in order to proceed through the game. The Oliver Twins programmed the Amstrad CPC and ZX Spectrum versions. The MSX version was a port of the ZX Spectrum version and was only released in Spain as Cazafantasmas II, which was developed by New Frontier and published by MCM Software S.A. In the United States, Activision planned to release the DOS, Commodore 64, and Amiga versions in October 1989. In the United Kingdom, the game was released in early December 1989. The Amiga and ZX Spectrum versions received a budget re-release in late 1991, published by The Hit Squad.

== Reception ==
Reception

Review scores
Publication	Score
ACE	251/1000 (Amiga/Atari ST)
Amstrad Action	94% (Amstrad CPC)
Computer and Video Games	85% (Atari ST); 82% (ZX Spectrum re-release)
Sinclair User	70/100 (ZX Spectrum)
Your Sinclair	62/100 (ZX Spectrum)
Zzap!64	60% (Amiga); 39% (C64)
Amiga Action	65% (Amiga); 16% (Amiga re-release)
Amiga Computing	68% (Amiga)
Amiga Format	79% (Amiga)
Amiga Power	11% (Amiga)
Amiga User International	40% (Amiga)
Commodore Format	43% (C64)
Commodore User	84% (Amiga)
The Games Machine	87% (Amiga/Atari ST); 84% (Amstrad CPC)
Games-X	4/5 (Amiga re-release)
ST Format	62% (Atari ST)
Zero	69/100 (Amiga); 70/100 (Atari ST)

Award
Publication	Award
Amstrad Action	Mastergame

David Wilson of Computer Gaming World wrote a mixed review of the DOS version. Wilson praised the graphics, the Statue of Liberty level, and the digitized voice tracks, and called the game "well-designed and easily learned." However, Wilson wrote, "Since the game can be played in less than an hour and players will probably play the game, at least, fifteen times before mastering it, some may feel that this is less than a bargain."

=== Non-DOS versions ===
The other computer versions of the game were generally praised for their graphics, (Note: According to multiple sources:) and their audio, including the use of the "Ghostbusters" song. (Note: According to multiple sources:) The final level was criticized, particularly for being anticlimactic, and for the difficulty in landing the Ghostbuster characters in the museum. Reviewers also criticized the long loading times, (Note: According to multiple sources:) and the need to switch between several disks.

Paul Glancey of Computer and Video Games considered it superior to the film and praised the gameplay, stating that the levels made good use of the film's action sequences. Amstrad Action also considered it better than the film, and wrote that the "good graphics immediately set this game apart" from typical film-license games, stating, "It captures a cartoonesque quality that manages to convey the comic aspects of the movie excellently." The Games Machine stated that the game "is quite addictive and succeeds in capturing the atmosphere of the film."

Commodore Format praised the gameplay, while Mark Mainwood of Commodore User praised the game as a good film tie-in and stated that it would appeal to almost anyone. Andy Smith of Amiga Format called the game a "good translation of the film and a worthy successor" to the original Ghostbusters video game (1984). Sinclair User also considered it a good adaptation of the film. Brian Nesbitt of ACE wrote that the game "fails to succeed both as a film conversion and as a game in its own right." Your Sinclair criticized the gameplay as repetitive and stated that the levels feel too distinct from each other with "no real feeling of progression". Mark Higham of ST Format considered the gameplay tedious and worse than the original Ghostbusters game.

Writers for Zero criticized the gameplay in their review of the Amiga and Atari ST versions, while Zzap!64 criticized the gameplay and graphics of the C64 version. Amiga Computing wrote that while the game "is undoubtedly an audio-visual feast, there is little game in it that is fun to play." Amiga User International stated that none of the levels were particularly addictive, and opined that the game "offers pretty poor value for money" considering that the player's "only motivation is to see the following stage". Reviewers for Amiga Action criticized the minimal number of levels.

In 1991, Amiga Power called the game a "disgrace" and wrote, "Almost everything you could possibly do in Ghostbusters II called for a disk swap - even getting killed on the very first level - and the playing-time-to-time-spent-buggering-around-with-disks ratio was so completely ridiculous that some people thought they'd been sold a demo version by mistake." The following year, Amiga Power's Stuart Campbell reviewed the re-release and criticized the gameplay as "lame and uninspired". Games-X also reviewed the re-release and called the game a "fairly impressive film conversion".
