= Beamrider =

1983 video game

- Intellivision cover art
- Developer: Action Graphics (Note: Atari 2600 version developed by Cheshire Engineering.)
- Publisher: Activision
- Designer: David Rolfe
- Platforms: Intellivision, ColecoVision, Commodore 64, Atari 2600, Atari 8-bit, Atari 5200, ZX Spectrum, MSX
- Release: September 1983: Intellivision; September 1983 ColecoVision; March 1984 C64; June 1984 2600; July 1984 Atari 8-bit, 5200; August 1984 ZX Spectrum; UK: 1984
- Genre: Fixed shooter
- Mode: Single-player

Beamrider is a fixed shooter video game written for the Intellivision by David Rolfe and published by Activision in 1983. The game was ported to the Atari 2600 (with a slightly reduced feature set), Atari 5200, Atari 8-bit computers, ColecoVision, Commodore 64, ZX Spectrum, and MSX.

== Gameplay ==
Gameplay screenshot (Atari 8-bit)

Beamrider takes place above Earth's atmosphere, where a large alien shield called the Restrictor Shield surrounds the Earth. The player's objective is to clear the Shield's 99 sectors of alien craft while piloting the Beamrider ship. The Beamrider is equipped with a short-range laser lariat and a limited supply of torpedoes. The player is given three at the start of each sector.

To clear a sector, fifteen enemy ships must be destroyed. A "Sentinel ship" will then appear, which can be destroyed using a torpedo (if any remain) for bonus points. Some enemy ships can only be destroyed with torpedoes, and some must simply be dodged. Occasionally during a sector, "Yellow Rejuvenators" (extra lives) appear. They can be picked up for an extra ship, but if they are shot they will transform into ship-damaging debris.

Activision offered a Beamrider patch to players who could get to Sector 14 with 40,000 points and sent in a screenshot of their accomplishment.

== Reception ==
The Deseret News in 1984 gave the ColecoVision version of Beamrider three stars, describing it as "basically a slide-and-shoot space game."

A reviewer for Your Commodore described the Commodore 64 version of the game as "a really good, wholesome arcade zapping game."

== See also ==
- List of Activision games: 1980–1999
- Radar Scope (1980)
- Juno First (1983)
