= Worm Whomper =

1983 video game

- Developer: Cheshire Engineering
- Publisher: Activision
- Designer: Tom Loughry
- Platform: Intellivision
- Release: 1983
- Genre: Action
- Mode: Single-player

Worm Whomper, released in 1983 by Activision, was one of six of the original games that Cheshire Engineering developed for Intellivision.

== Development ==
The game was written by Tom Loughry, who also wrote Advanced Dungeons & Dragons and The Dreadnaught Factor for Intellivision.

The cover art is a parody of Grant Wood's painting, American Gothic.

== Gameplay ==
The game centers around a farmer called Felton Pinkerton, who took his wife to the fair instead of spraying his corn crop with pesticide to protect it from insects. The player controls Felton, who is armed with a spray gun to get rid of the bugs that are now trying to eat his corn. Felton's crop of corn is displayed in the left side of the screen and the bugs approach from the right. These bugs include inchworms, moths, caterpillars, and slugs. If the bugs get past Felton, they will eat part of his corn crop. Players progress to the next level by getting rid of all of the bugs. In each level, the bugs become faster and there are more of them.
