= Disk swapping =

Swapping floppy disks in a computer

Disk swapping refers to the practice of inserting and removing, or swapping, floppy disks in a floppy disk drive-based computer system. In the early days of personal computers, before hard drives became commonplace, most fully outfitted computer systems had two floppy drives (addressed as A: and B: on MS-DOS, and also on CP/M – other systems had different conventions). Disk drives were expensive, however, and having two was seen as a luxury by many computer users who had to make do with a single drive.

The purpose of two floppy drives was so that the disk containing the application program could remain in the drive while the data disk containing the user's files could be accessed in the second drive. Without a second drive, in order to use a function of the program not loaded into memory, the user would have to first remove the data disk, then insert the program disk. When the user then wanted to save their file, the reverse operation would have to be performed. On some less-than-user-friendly systems, this could result in data loss when, for example, files were accidentally saved onto the program disk.

Disk swapping was an infamous feature of early Macintosh 128K systems, which were extremely RAM-starved.
