= Gee Bee Air Rally =

1987 video game

- Publisher: Activision
- Designers: Steve Cartwright; Gene Smith
- Platforms: Commodore 64, Amiga, Amstrad CPC, ZX Spectrum
- Release: 1987
- Genre: Racing

Gee Bee Air Rally (shown on the title screen as GeeBee Air Rally) is a 1987 airplane racing game by Activision. It was developed for Amiga, Amstrad CPC, Commodore 64 and ZX Spectrum. It is set in the 1920s and early 1930s in which the player is the pilot of a small airplane. The player's goal is to increase the score by flying the airplane through several races and special events. The player's aircraft is modelled on the Granville Brothers Gee Bee Model Z Super Sportster, a "flying engine" which was the predecessor of the more extreme Model R.

== Gameplay ==
This game is single-player only and has three difficulty levels, which the player must choose between before beginning play. The player's airplane is always yellow, and the races follow a pattern of three main events and one special event, which alternates between popping 30 balloons and flying to the right of red pylons and to the left of blue ones.

A primary obstacle is avoiding collision with other aircraft. After two collisions, the plane falters and the pilot parachutes out. This is followed by one of several pictures depicting the pilot in various landing places, such as a pigpen, a parched desert, a tree, or a barnyard of chickens.

Following successful completion of the special event, a picture of the pilot at an awards ceremony is shown, accompanied by period music.

== Reception ==
Compute! criticized the game's copy protection and repetitive cut scenes but praised the graphics and audio, concluding that "Gee Bee Air Rally is worthy of repeated play".
