= Rock n' Bolt =

1984 video game

- Developers: Action Graphics; Sega (SG-1000)
- Publishers: Activision; Sega (SG-1000)
- Designers: Carl Norden; Satoshi Fujishima (SG-1000)
- Composers: David Thiel; Satoshi Fujishima (SG-1000)
- Platforms: ColecoVision, Commodore 64, MSX, SG-1000
- Release: 1984
- Genre: Puzzle

Rock n' Bolt is a puzzle video game developed by Action Graphics and published in 1984 by Activision for ColecoVision, Commodore 64, MSX, and SG-1000.

== Gameplay ==
The objective of the game is to lock platforms into place according to a supplied map. There are three levels of difficulty; the second and third level have time limits.

== Reception ==
Computer and Video Games rated the ColecoVision version 86% in 1989.
