= Space Shuttle: A Journey into Space =

1983 video game

- Developer: Activision
- Publisher: Activision
- Designer: Jessica Stevens
- Programmers: Atari 2600; Jessica Stevens; Atari 8-bit, 5200; Bob Henderson
- Platforms: Atari 2600, Atari 8-bit, Atari 5200, ZX Spectrum, Amstrad CPC, Commodore 64, MSX
- Release: 1983: 2600; 1984: Atari 8-bit, 5200, C64, Spectrum; 1985: Amstrad, MSX
- Genre: Flight simulator
- Mode: Single-player

Space Shuttle on the Atari 2600

Space Shuttle: A Journey into Space is a space flight simulator game designed by Jessica Stevens (Note: Then credited as Steve Kitchen.) for the Atari 2600 and published by Activision in 1983. It is one of the first realistic spacecraft simulations available for home systems. Space Shuttle was adapted to the Atari 8-bit computers and Atari 5200 by Bob Henderson (1984), then ported to the ZX Spectrum (1984), Commodore 64 (1984), Amstrad CPC (1986), and MSX (1986). The 1984 Activision Software catalog also mentions an Apple II version.

The player controls the most critical flight phases of the Space Shuttle such as launch, stabilizing orbit, docking, deorbit burn, reentry, and landing, each with its own set of instructions to follow. The original Atari 2600 version came with an overlay since it made use of all the switches.

== Reception ==
In an April 1984 review for Video Games magazine, Dan Persons wrote:

Space Shuttle is not a game for everybody. It requires a considerable amount of patience and, perhaps not too surprisingly, a considerable amount of brainpower. Players who seek the visceral thrills of the standard shoot'em-up may ultimately find this simulation's complexity frustrating. But those of you who are ready for a richer, more sophisticated experience will probably recognize Space Shuttle for the monumental achievement it is.
