= Blast Chamber =

1996 video game

- North American PlayStation box art
- Developer: Attention to Detail
- Publisher: Activision
- Platforms: PlayStation, Sega Saturn
- Release: PlayStation: NA: October 26, 1996; EU: November 13, 1996; Saturn: EU: November 13, 1996; NA: December 20, 1996
- Genre: Action
- Modes: Single-player, multiplayer

Blast Chamber is a 1996 action puzzle video game developed by Attention to Detail and published by Activision for the PlayStation and Sega Saturn. It was the first non-sports four-player game for the PlayStation and Saturn. A demo was released in 1997 for MS-DOS, but the full version was never published.

== Gameplay ==
In the single-player game, the player navigates through 40 different cube-shaped puzzles, known as chambers. The player must collect a crystal orb and drop it off in the reactor before time runs out or the player character explodes. The player can kick the walls of the cube at certain points to make the entire chamber rotate, which is vital to that player reaching the end of each puzzle. Obstacles range from platforms, to spike pits, to giant fans. In addition, some "kickers" (switches in the form of green arrows) are placed on some walls to mislead the player. Each wall has a green platform that will rotate the chamber 90 degrees when the player pushes it. Once the crystal is dropped off in the reactor, the player moves on to the next level. After each level, the player is awarded 100 points for each second remaining on their timer. For every 10,000 points, the player gains an extra life. If the player makes it through all 40 chambers without using any cheat codes, there is an animation at the end. If even one cheat code is used, the player is prompted the message: "You made it! You're alive! You cheated. You're outta here." Single player mode is always 'Red Player'.

=== Eliminator mode ===
Screenshot from Blast Chamber Eliminator Mode

This mode has up to four computer-controlled or human players face off against each other in one of 20 different chambers. The winner is the last one alive at the end. Each player has C4 strapped to their suit with a timer continuously counting down. However, when a player possesses the crystal, that player's "Kill Clock" freezes until they put it in a reactor or lose it by being pushed or falling. Each player has a small pyramid holochamber assigned to them (one on each "side" of the chamber belonging to each of the players and color-coded to match) in which they can bring a crystal that is dropped at the beginning of the level to extend the amount of time on their timer. The other players will try to grab the crystal, by pushing its bearer and causing them to fall by rotating the chamber. Alternatively, a crystal can be dropped in a different player's chamber to cut off time from their timer. How much time is gained or lost when a crystal is placed in a reactor depends on the difficulty. Also, on Conflagration or Thermonuclear difficulty, if a player blows up and another player is standing too close, both players are blown up simultaneously. Once an orb is dropped off into a chamber, falls on spikes, falls in a pit, or blows up via the "Crystal Bomb" powerup, another one will appear.

=== Free-for-all mode ===
This mode is very similar to Eliminator Mode, except that there is a fixed amount of time that the game will go on for, and each player has an unlimited number of lives. The player who dies the fewest times is the winner. Adding and losing time on the timer is the same as in Eliminator Mode, where the crystal is dropped off in different players' squares.

== Development ==
According to Tom Sloper (senior producer) and Marc Metis (product producer) of Activision, "We wanted our product to be unique. With so many first-person shooters - so many driving games, we wanted to make something different that made a game what it's supposed to be - an original game that draws people in. We wanted to make a game that's fun with one, two, three or four players."

== Reception ==
Reception

Aggregate score
Aggregator	Score
GameRankings	70% (PS1)

Review scores
Publication	Score
AllGame	2/5 (SAT)
Electronic Gaming Monthly	7.675/10 (PS1)
Next Generation	3/5 (PS1)
Sega Saturn Magazine	63% (SAT)

Blast Chamber received mixed reviews. Shawn Smith and Dan Hsu of Electronic Gaming Monthly (EGM) were most positive, calling it "the most original game of the year" and "almost a perfect multiplayer game, like a Bomberman for the next generation." EGM later named it a runner-up for Best Original Concept of the Year (behind Tecmo's Deception). A reviewer for Next Generation found the game flawed but worth getting for those who own a multitap and enough friends to play with. Paul Glancey wrote in Sega Saturn Magazine that the concept is good but the visuals make the game too confusing and frustrating to be enjoyable. GamePro's Scary Larry noted some flaws but found them acceptable, and summarized the game as "fast and fun as you frantically try to outwit and outrun your foes." Critics typically praised the level designs, the graphics, and the intensity of the three-or-four-player sessions. Common criticisms were that the sounds are unexciting the character models are too small to see properly, and the single-player stages are over too quickly due to the low difficulty.
