= Apache Strike =

1987 video game

- Developer(s): William C. Appleton (Mac)
- Publisher(s): Silicon Beach Software; Activision (C64)
- Platform(s): Macintosh, Commodore 64, MS-DOS
- Release: 1987: Mac; 1989: C64; 1989: MS-DOS
- Mode(s): Single-player

Apache Strike is a 3D helicopter game first released for the Macintosh in 1987.

== Gameplay ==
Its objective is flying an Apache helicopter through a rudimentary hidden line-rendered cityscape in order to destroy the enemy's strategic defense computer. Enemy helicopters and tanks are encountered and must be shot down along the way. The Apache's position is shown in an onscreen map as well as bearing and distance to the defense computer. Some game events are presented in digitized speech by the Lifelike In-board Narrative Damage Assessment computer, or LINDA.

The intro music bears more than a passing resemblance to the Airwolf helicopter TV series theme.

== Reception ==
Compute! in 1989 called the PC version of Apache Strike's graphics "sparse but colorful", noting that it was among the few inexpensive games supporting VGA graphics. The magazine recommended the game to those who "just want to blow some bad guys out of the sky without having to think too hard".
