= Galaxy 5000 =

1991 video game

- North American box art
- Developer(s): Activision
- Publisher(s): Activision
- Designer(s): Chris Shen
- Composer(s): Russell Lieblich; Rick Boogar; Pete Mokris
- Platform(s): Nintendo Entertainment System
- Release: NA: February 1991; EU: 1991
- Genre(s): Racing game
- Mode(s): Single-player, multiplayer

Reception

Review score
Publication	Score
Total!	52%

Galaxy 5000: Racing in the 51st Century is a racing video game developed by Activision for the Nintendo Entertainment System.

== Summary ==
This video game takes place in the future using an outer space atmosphere. It features the racing of futuristic craft that can battle each other for finishing spots in the race. Each craft is also upgradeable and with each upgrade comes better shielding and weapons. This video game would become the inspiration for the Super NES video game Rock n' Roll Racing. Primitive voice effects are used when the ships collide with each other; three of the phrases are: "Hey!," "Excuse me!," and "Watch it."

== Reviews ==
8-Bit Central gave Galaxy 5000 a thumbs up basically saying that its a “fun” game while praising the game’s “crafty” driving.
