= Countdown to Shutdown =

1984 video game

- Developer: Creative Sparks
- Publisher: Creative Sparks
- Platforms: Apple II, Commodore 64
- Release: 1984

Countdown to Shutdown, originally known as Countdown to Meltdown in Europe, is a video game released in 1984 by Creative Sparks. In 1985 Activision published it in the US as Countdown to Shutdown.

== Gameplay ==
Countdown to Shutdown is a game in which the player directs robots in a subterranean energy plant to cool its overheating core.

== Reception ==
Gregg Williams reviewed the game for Computer Gaming World, and stated that "Overall, I like the Apple version of Countdown, and I'm sure the C-64 version is even more enjoyable. If you ever get the game completely solved, you can play a randomized version that will keep you busy for a while longer."
