= Countermeasure (video game) =

1983 video game

- Cover art
- Developer: Atari, Inc.
- Publishers: Atari, Inc.
- Platform: Atari 5200
- Release: NA: February 1983
- Genres: Action, shooter
- Modes: Single-player, multiplayer

Countermeasure is a 1983 action shooter video game developed and published by Atari, Inc. for the Atari 5200. Gameplay involves controlling a tank to destroy missile silos in a launch complex before time and fuel run out. Countermeasure is one of very few exclusive titles for the 5200, and was released in February 1983. It received positive reviews upon its original release, but later reception has been more mixed.

== Gameplay ==
Gameplay of Countermeasure.

Countermeasure is a military-themed action game in which players control a tank capable of moving and firing in 8 directions. The tank moves fastest in open areas and slows down when moving over rough terrain or obstacles. While it is primarily a single-player game, two players may also take turns in a multiplayer session.

The objective of the game is to destroy seven missile silos in a launch complex before time runs out in order to prevent terrorists from destroying Washington, DC. At the start of the game, the tank is randomly placed near the bottom of the playfield at a site in the complex. Each site contains a silo, armed pillboxes, and a supply depot which players may visit to refuel. Enemies including remote controlled tanks, jeeps, and cruise missiles begin to attack the player as the game continues, appearing more frequently on higher difficulty levels.

Upon successfully destroying all seven silos, the game begins again at a higher difficulty. The game ends when players lose all lives or run out of fuel. If time runs out before the player destroys all the silos, they must approach a silo and correctly enter a three-letter fail-safe code to disarm the missiles. The code is randomly generated at the start of each game, and clues to the code may be obtained at supply depots. Entering an incorrect code results in the missiles launching, ending the game.

== Development ==
Countermeasure was developed for the Atari 5200, and is one of the few exclusive titles for the system. The game's cover art was created by Terry Hoff. It was released in February 1983.

== Reception ==
Countermeasure received positive reviews upon its original release. A review in the February 1983 issue of Computer Entertainer awarded the game four out of four stars, calling it "a superb combination of war-game action and strategic planning", and praised the depth and replay value of the gameplay. In a July 1983 review, John Hubach of Electronic Fun with Computers & Games awarded Countermeasure 3.5 out of 4 stars, saying the game had "graphics and sound effects that are nothing short of brilliant" and that it has "plenty of fast and furious action".

Retrospective reviews have offered mixed opinions. Karlis Povisils of Atari HQ praised the game's use of the 5200 controller, but considered the gameplay to be too slow, writing that "it seems that Atari was more concerned with creating a game which used more than one button than with making Countermeasure a really fun game". Similarly, in a review for AllGame, Brett Weiss called the gameplay "slow and dull", and criticized the game's graphics and high difficulty. He unfavorably compared the game to Combat (1977) for the Atari 2600.

== Sequel ==
In 2009, independent developer Bob DeCrescenzo created an unofficial sequel to Countermeasure, titled FailSafe, for the Atari 7800. Gameplay is similar to the original game, with the addition of new terrain and powerups. In 2025, Atari acquired the publishing rights to the game and rebranded it as an official sequel, with the title Countermeasure II. Described as "a modern take" on the 5200 original, it was released as a physical cartridge in July 2025.
