= Ocean Ranger (video game) =

1988 video game

- Publisher: Activision
- Platforms: Commodore 64, MS-DOS
- Release: 1988
- Genre: Wargame

Ocean Ranger is a 1988 video game published by Activision.

== Gameplay ==
Ocean Ranger is a game in which several war zones are involved in naval combat.

== Reception ==
David Wilson reviewed the game for Computer Gaming World, and stated that "While Ocean Ranger should by no means be considered a "serious" wartime simulation, it can certainly be considered "serious" fun. It is challenging, fast-paced, and graphically interesting."
