= Star Rank Boxing II =

1988 video game

- Publisher: Activision
- Platforms: Apple II, Commodore 64, MS-DOS
- Release: 1988
- Genre: Sports

Star Rank Boxing II is a sports video game published by Activision in 1988.

== Gameplay ==
Star Rank Boxing II is a game in which the player creates a boxer using random statistics and chooses his training regimen.

== Reception ==
David M. Wilson and Johnny L. Wilson reviewed the game for Computer Gaming World, and stated that "All of this happens with such speed and facility that the fight takes on all the intensity of a real bout for the player(s)."
