= Toy Bizarre =

1984 video game

- Developer: Activision
- Publisher: Activision
- Designer: Mark Turmell
- Programmer: Mark Turmell
- Platforms: Commodore 64, ZX Spectrum
- Release: 1984: C64; 1985: Spectrum
- Genre: Platform
- Mode: Single-player

Toy Bizarre is a platform game written by Mark Turmell for the Commodore 64 and published by Activision in 1984. A port to the ZX Spectrum was released in 1985.

== Gameplay ==
Players control Merton, a maintenance man who works at a toy factory, represented by a series of platforms and valves. During one of his shifts, the toys come to life and rebel. Merton has to capture all the toys while avoiding a life-sized doll named Hefty Hilda. Hilda and Merton can freely travel through the factory, jumping on to the various platforms and toggling the valves on or off. While turned on, the valves create balloons. If Merton does not pop the balloon in time, it hatches a toy. Merton can not ordinarily touch the toys or Hilda; doing so causes him to lose one of his five lives.

Certain special platforms are linked to each other. If Merton jumps on one of these platforms, any toys on the linked platform are stunned, and he can capture them. Both Hilda and Merton can be killed through this same process if another character activates a linked platform, though Hilda eventually returns. The toys can also be stunned and thereafter captured by jumping over them. Once all the toys are captured, a new level is loaded. Higher levels feature more toys and valves. Bonus levels, called intermissions, allow the player to collect extra lives.

== Release ==
Toy Bizarre was announced alongside Zenji and several ports of Activision's earlier Atari 2600 games to the Commodore 64. The ZX Spectrum version was released in May 1985, adapted from the C64 original by James Software Ltd.

== Reception ==
Reception

Review scores
Publication	Score
Personal Computer News	7/10
Your Commodore	5/5
Popular Computing Weekly	2/5
Your Computer	3/5

Reviewing the Commodore 64 version, Peter Worlock of Personal Computer News wrote that it "looks like standard platform game" but adds many complications. Worlock praised the animation and soundtrack, calling it "enjoyable for all the family". Your Commodore's reviewer called it an addictive game with good graphics and sound, recommending it to players who enjoy difficult games.

Reviewing the Spectrum version, John Minson of Popular Computing Weekly called it "enjoyable for a while" but criticized the graphics and gameplay, which he said "lacks finesse". Your Computer also criticized the Spectrum version's gameplay, calling it repetitive and unoriginal. Your Sinclair had three authors review the game; one mentioned the platform game format was becoming played out by that point but said Toy Bizarre had "reasonable entertainment value"; the other two criticized it for having poor controls and being boring. Sinclair Programs called it "fun, but not very professionally presented".

In a retrospective on 1980s Activision games, Retro Gamer said that the game "manages to out-Mario Mario Bros."
