= Sargon V: World Class Chess =

1992 video game

- European cover art
- Publisher: Activision
- Producer: Nic Lavroff
- Designers: Nic Lavroff; Chuck Romberger
- Programmer: Dr. Destructo
- Artist: Rich Payne
- Composer: Russell Lieblich
- Platforms: MS-DOS, Classic Mac OS
- Release: February 1992 (DOS); June 1995 (Mac)
- Genre: Computer chess
- Modes: Single-player, multiplayer

Sargon V: World Class Chess is a 1992 chess video game published by Activision. It is part of the Sargon series.

== Gameplay ==
Sargon V features VGA graphics and supports sound cards. The game supports 2D and 3D game views. The game features a mode where the computer replays famous games by chess masters. Another mode has the player take a role of a chess master and guess the moves they made.

== Reception ==
Reception

Review scores
| Publication | Score |
|---|---|
| Génération 4 | 84% |
| Tilt | 18/20 |
| Amiga Joker | 71% |
| MacFormat | 63% |
| PC Joker | 77% |
| Play Time | 69% |

Game Players PC Entertainment wrote: "Activision's chess title isn't quite as challenging as Grandmaster Chess, but the vast majority of chess fans will find Sargon V more than strong enough to keep them playing for quite a while." PC Joker rated the game about equal to Chessmaster 3000, the German language option was noted as the most significant feature above the competition. Amiga Joker compared the DOS version with 12 other chess programs in a special Strategy issue and Sargon V was rated the fourth highest. Play Time compared the game unfavorably to Chessmaster 3000. Génération 4 called the game a "classic" and "perfectly realized". Tilt said: "if it is not the most beautiful chess program, World Class Chess is currently the strongest (even superior to the remarkable Chess Champion)."
