= Tongue of the Fatman =

1989 video game

- The North American box art for Tongue of the Fatman, which PC Gamer ranked as among the worst of all time
- Developers: Brian A. Rice, Inc. MindSpan (C64); Mediagenic (Genesis)
- Publishers: Activision; Genesis: JP: Sanritsu; NA: RazorSoft
- Producers: Mike Suarez; Michael Latham; Wayne Townsend
- Designer: Mark D. Waterman
- Programmer: Brian A. Rice
- Platforms: Commodore 64; MS-DOS; Sega Genesis
- Release: MS-DOS: NA: 1989; Commodore 64: NA: 1990; EU: 1990; Sega Genesis: JP: October 12, 1990; NA: December 20, 1991
- Genre: Fighting
- Modes: Single-player, Multiplayer

Tongue of the Fatman (or simply Fatman for the Japan release) is a 1989 fighting game developed by Brian A. Rice, Inc. and published by Activision, originally released for MS-DOS and later ported to the Commodore 64 and Sega Genesis.

The game is also known as Mondu's Fight Palace on the Commodore 64, and Slaughter Sport in its Sega Genesis iteration. The working title for the game was 'Red Belt'. In single-player mode, the player selects from a roster of alien and fantastical races and progresses through a series of matches, ultimately facing the game's antagonist, Mondu the Fat. Matches incorporate an in-game economy allowing players to wager currency and purchase items between fights. A crowd-favor mechanic penalizes repeated use of the same attack, discouraging exploitative tactics.

Tongue of the Fatman received positive reviews upon its original release, with Raze awarding the Genesis version 89% and the editors of Game Player's PC Strategy Guide naming it their 1989 "Best PC Arcade/Action Game". In retrospect, the game became noted largely for its unusual title and visual style, with both Game Revolution and CNET ranking it among the worst video game names ever, and PC Gamer listing it among the fifteen weirdest PC games of all time.

== Overview ==
In single-player mode, players begin as any of the 3 races and must take on each of the 10 matches, facing off with each different race from left to right of the given list. Afterwards, they must fight the game's main antagonist: Mondu the Fat, the champion of the fight palace and the last obstacle of the game.

In the Genesis port, single-player mode centers on the player beginning as Rex (or as another fighter through cheat codes) and must take on each of the 8 standard fighters (including their mutant clone) twice, with the second set being the more difficult palette swaps.

== Characters ==
The game gives the player ten races to choose from, each race having its own special moves. The original version of the game starts with the player having 3 species to choose from, unlocking new characters by defeating them in battle. These 10 races includes:

=== Original ===
- Rex
  - A Humanoid
- Rubic
  - A CyberDroid
- Freezer
  - A Cryoplast
- Edwina
  - An Amazoid
- Stump
  - A Bi-Husker
- Slasher
  - A Rayzor
- Behemoth
  - A Mammath
- Puff Boy
  - A Puftian
- Colonoid
  - A Colonoid
- Mondu (final boss)
  - A Celluloid

The single-player mode progression follows the above list in order. The Fat Man's special ability is the "Tongue Lash", where his belly opens and sprawls out a tongue tweak that jabs the enemy. Despite this being the final boss fight of the game, players have defeated Mondu in as little as 5 seconds.

=== Genesis ===
The Genesis version of the game features a different 17-fighter roster (eight of which are palette swaps):

- Rex / M.C. Fire
- Edwina / Sheba
- Guano / Weezil
- Bonapart / Skinny
- Robochic / Braniac
- Stump / Buff
- Ramses / El Toro
- Webra / Spidra
- Mondu (final boss)

Only Rex, Edwina, Stump, and Mondu are present in both versions of the game.

== Items ==
In-game currency is earned after the completion of each match, and the money earned can be increased through wagering. The player starts off with $1000 to spend on items and wager with. Wagers placed are based on the time it takes for them to defeat their opponent, if players exceed the given time restraint they will lose the bet, but they can still win the initial purse prize money by winning the match. The merchant's shop is set up with six items on the first three pages, with the fourth page holding one of four random items that rotate out every match. The player and combatant are both allowed to carry up to four items in each match. There are a total of 24 different items in the game; all of which are consumed upon use.

== Gameplay ==
There are three status bars, with the blue bar representing the character's hit points, the green bar standing for the crowd's favor, and the red bar displaying the effectiveness of techniques. The higher the red bar, the more damage attacks deal; this bar declines after repeating the same offensive maneuver. This status bar is a clever balancing mechanic that makes spamming attacks less reliable and a less effective tactic. As for controls, the DOS platform to the PC version has been referred to as "clunky". Each character has 15 basic moves and 1 unique special ability that varies for each race. With each go around, the player has a maximum of 3 losses, every loss puts the player back two fights in the roster, and each of these defeats cost $100 for the good doctor to revive the player's mangled corpse.

== Reception ==
Reception

Review scores
Publication	Score
Computer and Video Games	GEN: 79%
Electronic Gaming Monthly	GEN: 20/40
GamePro	GEN: 21/25
Raze	GEN: 89%

Tongue of the Fatman was positively received in its original release, but was looked upon negatively in retrospect. Both Game Revolution and CNET ranked it in their list of the worst video game names ever, whilst Mondu, the game's antagonist, was ranked among UGO's list of the "Unsexiest Sexy Video Game Characters" coming in at number 3. Tongue of the Fatman received a spot in PC Gamer's list of the "15 Weirdest PC Games Of All Time", stating that "For raw, eye-popping 'What the crap?!'ery though, you can't do much better than this alien blood sport."

The editors of Game Player's PC Strategy Guide gave Tongue of the Fatman their 1989 "Best PC Arcade/Action Game" award. They wrote, "Activision's graphics are as wild as Fatman's title, and the game play is more than satisfactory.".
