= Master of the Lamps =

1985 video game

- Developer: Activision
- Publisher: Activision
- Producer: Brad Fregger
- Designer: Peter Kaminski
- Programmer: Russell Lieblich
- Composer: Russell Lieblich
- Platforms: Amstrad CPC, Apple II, Atari 8-bit, Commodore 64, MSX
- Release: 1985
- Genre: Music
- Modes: Seven Trials (beginner); Throne Quest (standard); Magic Carpet (practice)

Master of the Lamps is a music video game published in 1985 by Activision. It was released for the Amstrad CPC, Apple II, Atari 8-bit computers, Commodore 64, and MSX.

== Plot ==
The death of an Arabian prince's father, the king, shatters three enchanted oil lamps, freeing the three genies trapped within. The genies overrun the palace; to contain them, the prince must reassemble the three broken lamps. The player, in the role of the prince wearing a white thawb and red keffiyeh, must journey into the seven dens of each genie, as each den contains one of the lamp pieces.

== Gameplay ==
Gameplay screenshot (Atari 8-bit)

Gameplay alternates between two modes. In the first, the prince maneuvers a flying carpet through a winding tunnel to a genie's den. In practice, this requires the player to direct the carpet over diamond-shaped gates as they appear; failure to do so returns the prince to the beginning of the tunnel.

Once in the den, the second mode, the player strikes a gong thrice to summon the genie. The genie draws from a hookah, and blows out a ball of smoke. From the smoke emerges a sequence of tones, which the player must repeat in a call-and-response pattern. In order to play a tone, the player must strike the corresponding gong. If the player strikes the incorrect gong, or strikes the correct gong too early, the genie's magic transports the prince to the beginning of the tunnel.

In the seven dens of the first genie, each tone is audible, and manifests as a colored quaver (eighth note) that floats toward the ground. In the seven dens of the second genie, the tone is inaudible, so the player must match the color of the note to the color of the corresponding gong. In the seven dens of the third genie, the tone is audible, but no note appears; the player must recognize the note's pitch, and strike the correct gong. When the player passes the trial, a gateway to another tunnel opens.

After passing the musical trials of the three genies, the player navigates one final tunnel to the palace. If the player succeeds, the prince reclaims the palace.

== Reception ==
Antic in 1986 called Master of the Lamps an "offbeat game program with a number of unique elements". While stating that "it does become a little monotonous", the magazine approved of the non-violent gameplay.
