= Mindshadow (video game) =

1984 video game

- Developer: Interplay Productions
- Publisher: Activision
- Platforms: Amiga, Amstrad CPC, Apple II, Atari 8-bit, Atari ST, Commodore 64, Mac, IBM PC, ZX Spectrum
- Release: 1984
- Genre: Graphic adventure

Mindshadow is a 1984 graphic adventure game released for the Amstrad CPC, Apple II, Atari 8-bit computers, Commodore 64, Mac, IBM PC compatibles (as a self-booting disk), ZX Spectrum, and later the Atari ST and Amiga The game was developed by Interplay Productions and published by Activision.

== Production and release ==
Interplay entered into an $100,000 contract with Activision to produce three illustrated text adventure titles, of which this was one. One of the game's programmers, Allen Adham, hired by Brian Fargo, CEO of Interplay Productions, would later be one of the founders of Blizzard. Rebecca Heineman, who worked on the game, would later found Logicware. The game had the same gaming engine as The Tracer Sanction, and the art was drawn by QuickDraw. It was based loosely on the Robert Ludlum novel The Bourne Identity. Fargo would later say that the amnesiac storyline was unique for the time and set the game apart from its contemporaries. Mindshadow was a "middling success" and "solid seller". The game was included in the Interplay's 10 Year Anthology.

== Plot ==
The player starts on a beach with no memory of his identity. The island is a self-contained area with beaches, rocky cliffs, a hut and a quicksand area, which serves as a maze for the player to reach another location of the game. The character's main objective is to gather objects necessary to assemble a bonfire as a signal for any passing ships.

Once this is accomplished, the character finds himself on board a pirate ship pursued by the Royal Navy without a means to leave the ship or reach any destination. The player has to find a means to stop the ship and thus be rescued and dropped somewhere in London. Clues about the character's past are introduced at this point, as the character receives mysterious instructions and even evades attempts against his life. After buying a forged ticket, the character flies to Luxembourg where he receives more clues and finally confront his nemesis.

If the player has uncovered enough clues (i.e. by reading a newspaper, or finding notes and messages on dead bodies) at the very end, the character will be able to regain his memory. It is revealed that he is wealthy industrialist William Arcman, whose evil twin brother, Jared, having faked his own death, attempted to make William disappear and then steal his identity to take advantage of his wealth. The story started right after Jared hit William on the head and dropped him on a desert island.

== Gameplay ==
Gameplay screenshot (Atari 8-bit)

The detective mystery is portrayed in an interactive fiction adventure game style. A window displays static graphics with the environment the character sees.

An important command of the game is REMEMBER which is used with clues. (e.g. REMEMBER WILLIAM ARCMAN) which is obligatory for the player to regain his memory at the end.

The game accepts also the phrase HELP CONDOR; a condor appears giving the player cryptic hints (when available). This can be employed only three times in each playthrough.

== Reception ==
Reception

Award
| Publication | Award |
|---|---|
| Crash | Smash! |

Sinclair User awarded 2 stars out of 5, describing the game as "not very original" and "rather small." Crash praised its distinct style.

Aktueller Software Markt gave it 8.5 out of 10. Zzap!64 rated it 75 out of 100. Your Sinclair rated it 7 out of 10 and Tilt gave it 4 Stars. Info said it was a nice graphic adventure game. Amstrad Action felt the game was surprising. Lemon64 felt the title was merely adequate.

== Sales ==
The game sold 100,000 copies.
