= Ballblazer =

1985 video game

- Developer: Lucasfilm Games
- Publishers: Epyx; Activision; Atari Corporation (5200/7800); Pony Canyon (Famicom)
- Director: David Levine
- Designers: David Levine; Peter Langston; David Riordan; Garry Hare
- Programmer: Aric Wilmunder Atari 65XE
- Composer: Russell Lieblich
- Platforms: Amstrad CPC, Apple II, Atari 8-bit, Atari 5200, Atari 7800, Commodore 64, Famicom, MSX, ZX Spectrum, Atari 65XE
- Release: 1985: Atari 8-bit, C64, Apple II; 1986: 5200, CPC, MSX, Spectrum; 1987: 7800, Atari 8-bit cartridge 1988: Famicom
- Genres: Sports, action
- Modes: Single-player, multiplayer

Ballblazer is a futuristic sports game created by Lucasfilm Games and published in 1985 by Epyx. Along with Rescue on Fractalus!, it was one of the initial pair of releases from Lucasfilm Games, Ballblazer was developed and first published for the Atari 8-bit computers. The principal creator and programmer was David Levine. The game was called Ballblaster during development; some pirated versions bear this name.

It was ported to the Apple II, ZX Spectrum, Amstrad CPC, Commodore 64, and MSX. Atari 5200 and Atari 7800 ports were published by Atari Corporation. A version for the Famicom was released by Pony Canyon.

== Gameplay ==
Gameplay screenshot (Atari 8-bit)

Ballblazer is a simple one-on-one sports-style game bearing similarities to basketball and soccer. Each side is represented by a craft called a "rotofoil", which can be controlled by either a human player or a computer-controlled "droid" with ten levels of difficulty. The game allows for human vs. human, human vs. droid, and droid vs. droid matches. The basic objective of the game is to score points by either firing or carrying a floating ball into the opponent's goal. The game takes place on a flat, checkerboard playfield, and each player's half of the screen is presented from a first-person perspective.

A player can gain possession of the ball by running into it, at which point it is held in a force field in front of the craft. The opponent can attempt to knock the ball away from the player using the fire button, and the player in possession of the ball can also fire the ball toward the goal. When a player does not have possession of the ball, his or her rotofoil automatically turns at 90-degree intervals to face the ball, while possessing the ball turns the player toward the opponent's goal. The goalposts move from side to side at each end of the playfield, and as goals are scored, the goal becomes narrower.

Pushing the ball through the goal scores one point, firing the ball through the posts from close range scores two points, and successfully scoring from long range (where the goalposts are not visible) scores three points. The maximum number of total points between the two players is ten, meaning that any points scored that would take the combined total above ten will cause the opponent's score to be reduced by the same amount, resulting in a kind of tug of war scoring system. The game ends when either a player successfully scores ten points or the timer runs out. If time runs out and the score is tied, the game goes into "sudden death", where the first player to score wins.

== Development ==
Ballblazer and Rescue on Fractalus! were the first two games developed by the fledgling Lucasfilm Computer Division Games Group. The Games Group had been established in 1982 on a $1 million funding from Atari, Inc. in exchange for the "right of first refusal" for Atari as publisher.

Both games were developed with the Atari 8-bit computers and Atari 5200 console in mind. The games were ready by March 1984 and were first publicly revealed on a Lucasfilm press conference on May 8. Cartridge versions for the Atari computers and the 5200 were planned to be the released first in the third quarter of 1984, with disk versions for the Commodore 64, IBM PC, and Apple IIc and IIe coming under the Atarisoft label in the fourth quarter of that year. Ballblazer and Rescue on Fractalus! were also scheduled to be released for the then-upcoming Atari 7800 console.

On July 3, Warner Communications sold all assets of the Consumer Division of Atari, Inc. to Jack Tramiel, and the agreement with Lucasfilm fell through. On the Winter Consumer Electronics Show on January 5–8, 1985, with both Ballblazer and Rescue on Fractalus! not yet being released on any platform, Epyx became a distributor for both games, which would be released in disk format for the Atari 8-bit and Commodore 64 computers. The Atari 5200 versions were not part of the distribution deal. Epyx finally published the Atari 8-bit versions of both games by May 1985, and the Commodore 64 version of Ballblazer by September of that year.

Besides the Atari 8-bit and Commodore 64 computers, Ballblazer was ported to the Apple II by K-Byte, and to Amstrad CPC, MSX and ZX Spectrum computers by Activision, who published the game in Europe. While the IBM PC port announced in 1984 never materialized, Tramiel's Atari Corporation eventually released the Atari 5200 cartridge version in limited quantities in late 1986, manufactured from the stock inherited from the July 1984 buyout of Atari, Inc.; the cartridge version for the Atari 8-bit computers in December 1987, packaged for their new XE Game System; and the Atari 7800 version in March 1988. In Japan, Pony Canyon published a Nintendo Famicom port in 1988.

== Soundtrack ==
Ballblazer music sample
A sample of Ballblazer music from the Commodore 64 version

Ballblazer's theme music, called "Song of the Grid" and heard between matches, was algorithmically generated, a technique designed by Lucasfilm Games team leader Peter Langston and called "riffology". The lead melody is assembled from a predefined set of 32 eight-note melody fragments, or riffs, which are put together randomly by an algorithm that also makes choices on several parameters including "how fast to play the riff, how loud to play it, when to omit or elide notes, when to insert a rhythmic break". The melody is accompanied by bassline, drums and chords, which are also assembled on the fly by a simplified version of the above approach. In effect the music plays forever, without repeating itself but without straying too far from the original theme. Langston, an experienced jazz, rock, and folk musician, said of Ballblazer's music: "One reviewer, an eminent jazz player [Pat Metheny], said it sounded like John Coltrane did it. I think that's my best compliment so far". The Atari 7800 version was one of the rare releases for the system to use the POKEY additional sound chip.

== Reception ==
Reception

Review score
Publication	Score
Zzap!64	98%

Award
Publication	Award
Zzap!64	Gold Medal

Computer Gaming World stated that the "quick and intense" Ballblazer "squeezes more out of the Atari 400/800 than any game I've ever seen ... spectacular graphics". Info rated Ballblazer four stars out of five, stating that "it is undoubtedly the FASTEST game available for the 64" and recommending it to "gamers with strobe-like reflexes".

Zzap!64 gave an enthusiastic review of the Commodore 64 version of the game, their only criticism being weak sound effects. With an overall rating of 98% the game was described as being "the best sports simulation to hit the 64 yet". Commodore User were less impressed, stating that playing against the computer gave "little satisfaction" although this "improved slightly" when playing with a human opponent. The reviewer felt "inhibited by the constraints of the game". It was rated 3 out of 5 stars for value.

Computer and Video Games gave the Atari 7800 version a 97% score in 1989. In a retrospective review, Atari 7800 Forever gave it a 3.5 out of 5, and notes that it has the best audio of any game in the entire 7800 library.

In a retrospective review of the Commodore 64 version from 2007, Eurogamer's Kristan Reed said "its visual approach has dated hideously" but it remained "a fascinating period piece". It was rated 6/10.

== Legacy ==
In 1990, LucasArts and Rainbow Arts released a remake and follow-up called Masterblazer for the Amiga, Atari ST, and MS-DOS. In 1997, a remake of the original titled Ballblazer Champions was released for the PlayStation. Latter on was designed to take advantage of the console's graphics hardware as well.

== See also ==
- Rescue on Fractalus!
