= The Dreadnaught Factor =

1983 video game

- Atari 5200 box art
- Developer(s): Cheshire Engineering
- Publisher(s): Activision
- Designer(s): Tom Loughry
- Platform(s): Intellivision, Atari 8-bit, Atari 5200
- Release: Intellivision: September 1983; Atari 8-bit, 5200: May 1984
- Genre(s): Scrolling shooter
- Mode(s): Single-player

The Dreadnaught Factor is a scrolling shooter game written by Tom Loughry for the Intellivision and published by Activision in 1983. It is one of several Intellivision games developed at Cheshire Engineering for Activision. Ports to the Atari 8-bit computers and Atari 5200 followed in 1984.

== Gameplay ==
The player flies a small fighter spacecraft to attack a dreadnaught, a large and heavily armed vessel. Each dreadnaught approaches the "Galactic Unstable Energy Field", which acts as a defensive line. The goal is to destroy or disable each dreadnaught before it can reach the Energy Field and launch its missiles to destroy a planet the player is entrusted with defending.

As the game progresses, the player can make repeated passes over the dreadnaught, one fighter at a time, attempting to weaken its defenses, slow its progress, and finally destroy it. The fighter is equipped with lasers and bombs to attack different targets. Bombing the dreadnaught's engines slows its progress, while shooting out its bridges reduces its ability to return fire from any intact gun turrets. In addition, each dreadnaught has five missile silos; if all of these are destroyed, it will be unable to attack the planet once it is in range. The dreadnaught advances toward the planet once the fighter has either flown its entire length or been destroyed.

In order to destroy the dreadnaught, the player has to bomb all of its energy vents, causing the vessel to overheat and explode. As soon as a dreadnaught is destroyed, another one of a different design arrives. There are five types of dreadnaughts, each of which poses its own challenges. The game ends once every dreadnaught or fighter has been destroyed, or if one of them destroys the planet by moving into range with any of its missile silos intact.

The game has difficulty levels from "Basic" and "Novice" to "Expert" and finally, "Impossible" or "You've Got to Be Kidding". The dreadnaughts' speed, rate of fire, and fleet size are increased at higher difficulty levels.

== Reception ==
A December 1983 review in Joystik magazine awarded the game four stars and called it "a sure winner".
