= Zenji (video game) =

1984 video game

- Cover courtesy of the Living Computer Museum
- Developer: Activision
- Publisher: Activision (UK) Limited
- Designer: Matthew Hubbard
- Platforms: Atari 5200, Atari 8-bit, ColecoVision, Commodore 64, MSX, ZX Spectrum
- Release: 1984
- Genre: Puzzle

Zenji is a puzzle video game designed by Matthew Hubbard and published by Activision in 1984. It was released for the Atari 5200, Atari 8-bit computers, ColecoVision, Commodore 64, MSX, and ZX Spectrum. Hubbard previously wrote Dolphin for the Atari 2600.

== Gameplay ==
Gameplay screenshot (Atari 8-bit)

Zenji is a maze-based game, wherein the player controls a "disembodied, Mandarin-style head". The challenge is to connect a series of randomly rotated maze-segments in an attempt to align them with a glowing artifact, known as "the source", which acts as each maze's focal point. The player moves to each segment of the maze and attempts to rotate that portion so that the source's green light can shine into that region, signifying a correct alignment. If all portions of the maze are connected successfully before the end of a timer, the player is awarded points, and moves on to the next stage. Successive mazes introduce greater complexity and hazards to the player's survival.

== Reception ==
In the conclusion of the review for the Commodore 64 edition of Zenji, the author in Compute! Gazette stated, "Although final understanding of the source remains elusive, Zenji is an undeniably enjoyable game". Of note, the last paragraph of the review also stated that, "Zenji appears to be a multiplayer game...up to 8 acolytes at a time...There's no documentation concerning this, however."

Gregg Williams reviewed the game for Computer Gaming World, and stated that "If you like geometric puzzles and games like Othello, you should like Zenji. It is a potential classic and gives exceptional value for the money."

Computer and Video Games rated the ColecoVision version 90% in 1989.
