= Atari 5200 =

Home video game console

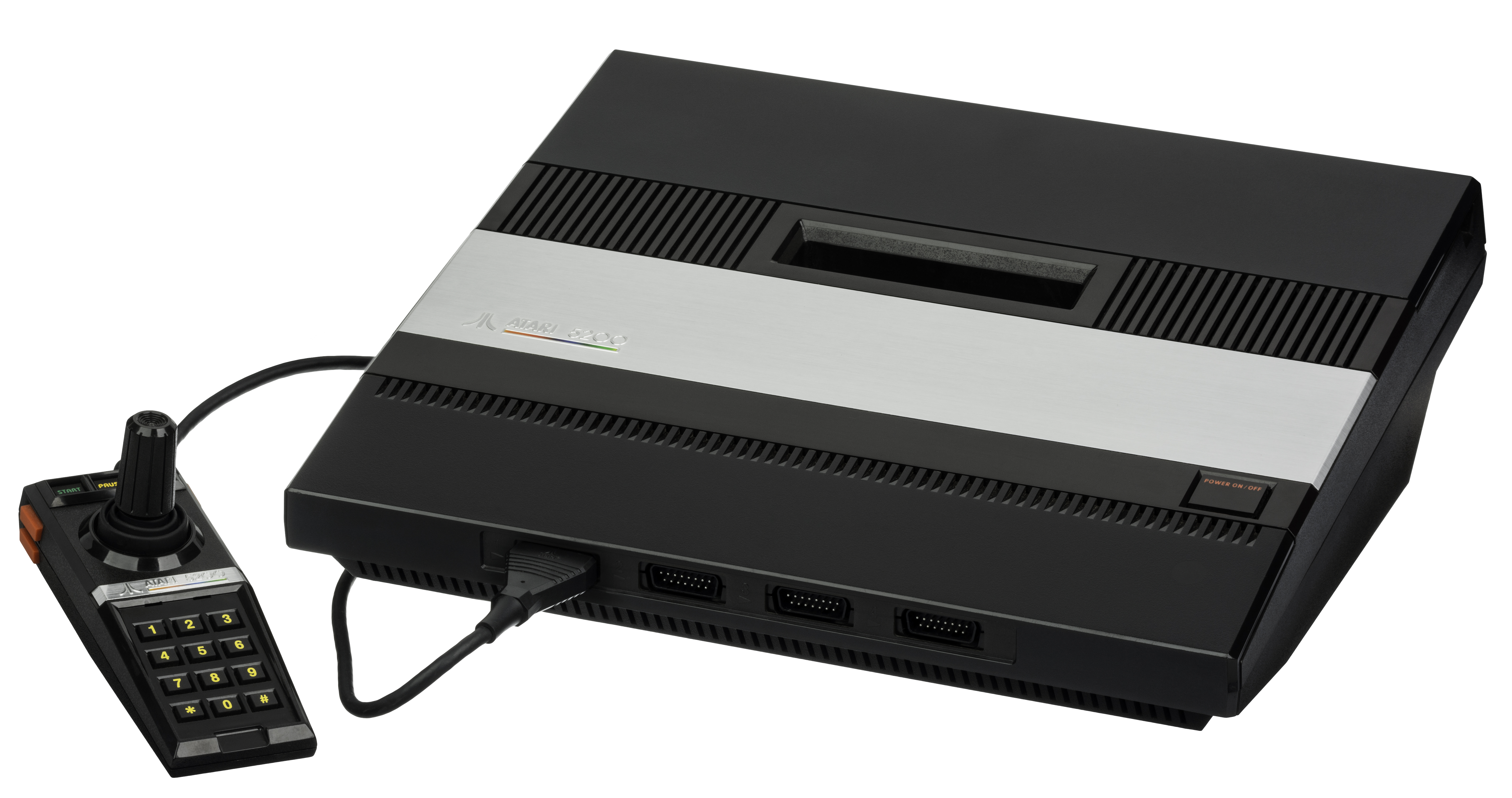
- Atari 5200 and one of its controllers
- Manufacturer: Atari, Inc.
- Type: Home video game console
- Generation: Second
- Released: NA: October 1982
- Introductory price: US$299.95 (equivalent to $1,000 in 2025)
- Discontinued: May 21, 1984
- Units sold: 1 million
- Media: ROM cartridge
- CPU: MOS 6502C @ 1.79 MHz
- Memory: 16 KB RAM
- Controller input: Joystick; Trak-Ball
- Predecessor: Atari 2600
- Successor: Atari 7800

The Atari 5200 (Note: Also marketed as the Atari 5200 Advanced Video Entertainment System or the Atari 5200 SuperSystem) is a home video game console introduced in 1982 by Atari, Inc. as a higher-end complement for the popular Atari Video Computer System. The VCS was renamed to Atari 2600 at the time of the 5200's launch. Created to compete with Mattel's Intellivision, the 5200 wound up a direct competitor of ColecoVision shortly after its release. While the Coleco system shipped with the first home version of Nintendo's Donkey Kong, the 5200 included the 1978 arcade game Super Breakout, which had already appeared on previous Atari home platforms.

The system architecture is almost identical to that of the Atari 8-bit computers, although software is not directly compatible between them. The 5200's controllers have an analog joystick and a numeric keypad along with start, pause, and reset buttons. The 360-degree non-centering joystick was touted as offering more control than the eight-way Atari CX40 joystick of the 2600, but it was a focal point for criticism.

On May 21, 1984, during a press conference at which the Atari 7800 was introduced, company executives revealed that the 5200 had been discontinued after less than two years on the market. Total sales of the system were reportedly in excess of 1 million units.

== History ==
=== Development ===
Following the release of the Video Computer System in 1977, Atari began development on hardware for its next generation of video game consoles. When Ray Kassar took over as Atari CEO in November 1978, this development shifted entirely towards home computers as the Atari 400 and 800 home computer systems.

Atari's Consumer Division moved on to a more direct upgrade of the Atari 2600 known internally as "Super Stella" or the Atari 3200. The company proposed a three console product line with the 2600 on the low end, a modified Atari 400 computer on the high end, and the 3200 in the middle. As development stalled on the 3200 following a number of technical issues, the 3200 was dropped in favor of the modified Atari 400 design.

In 1981, Atari's Advanced Technology Group began work on this next generation console under the codename "PAM" (short for Personal Arcade Machine). Lead engineer on the project was Pete Gerrard and the machine's operating system was written by Rob Zdybel. Early prototypes of the system were also known as the "Atari Video System X – Advanced Video Computer System". According to Michael Moone, then president of Atari's consumer electronics division, they created the system "in the same spirit in which an automobile manufacturer builds different models to suit different tastes."

=== Release ===
In January 1982 during the Winter CES trade show in Las Vegas, Atari unveiled the PAM project publicly for the first time. Announced as the "Supergame", the system was set to be released in time for the 1982 Christmas season. At the Summer CES show in June of the same year, Atari officially announced the Atari 5200 name, and set an October release date for the system. A voice synthesis module (similar to Mattel's Intellivoice), an Atari 2600 adapter (allowing the 5200 to play Atari 2600 games), and a trackball controller were all teased for later release in 1983.

In October 1982, the 5200 began appearing on store shelves in a handful of major department stores, retailing for $299.95. The console saw an extremely limited initial run, and only became available nationwide starting in January 1983. 10 games were announced for the system's launch, with Atari planning a total of 14 releases by the end of the year. In total, only 9 games were actually released for the 5200 in 1982, and one of the announced launch titles, Asteroids, was fully cancelled.

By mid 1983, a number of third-party publishers for the Atari 2600 began announcing releases for the 5200 as well, including Imagic, Parker Brothers, and CBS Electronics. Meanwhile, in June 1983 during Summer CES, Atari announced a price drop for the 5200 down to $199 along with a new model for the system with only two controller ports and modified controllers. This newer two port model was released later that summer, now including Pac-Man as a pack-in title. The trackball controller and Atari 2600 adapter also released that summer. The voice synthesis module, initially promised for the system at launch, was never released.

A release in Europe was initially planned for 1983, however Atari cancelled those plans in early July 1983, citing poor American sales as a factor.

=== Decline ===
The Atari 5200 failed to gain market traction almost immediately, and only sold a fraction of the units its predecessor had sold. The 5200's problems were also compounded by the video game crash of 1983. By the start of 1984, many companies had begun to pull out of the video game market, dropping support for the under-performing 5200. This included Atari themselves, who only released four games for the system in that year, ending with Choplifter in May. Atari also announced in May that it had officially discontinued the platform.

In July, Atari Inc.'s consumer division was sold to Jack Tramiel, who followed up by renaming his own company Atari Corporation. Atari Corp retained the rights to the Atari 5200 platform, but following the acquisition, all marketing and development around the 5200 ceased. Parker Brothers and Activision continued to publish games for the system only through to the end of 1984. The last third party release, Bounty Bob Strikes Back! by Big Five Software, was the only 5200 game released in 1985. By 1986, Computer Entertainer declared the 5200 had "gone to video game heaven".

Three final games were released for the 5200 by Atari Corp in 1986. All three, Ballblazer, Rescue on Fractalus!, and Gremlins, had been part of major licensing agreements between popular Hollywood directors George Lucas and Steven Spielberg and all three had begun manufacture before Jack Tramiel's acquisition. These games saw almost no marketing upon their release.

== Hardware ==
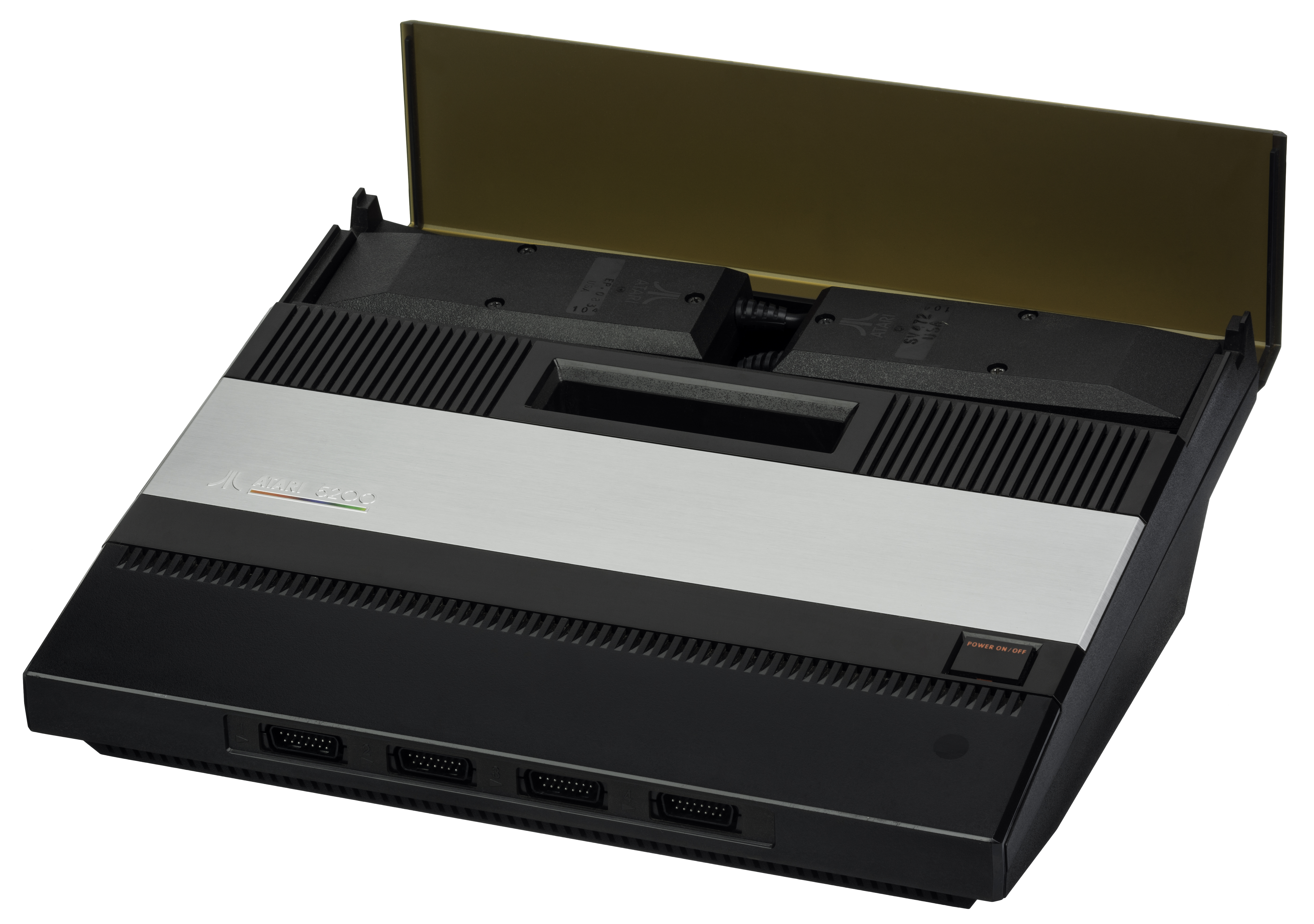
The 5200's large size is due in part to controller storage in the back of the unit.

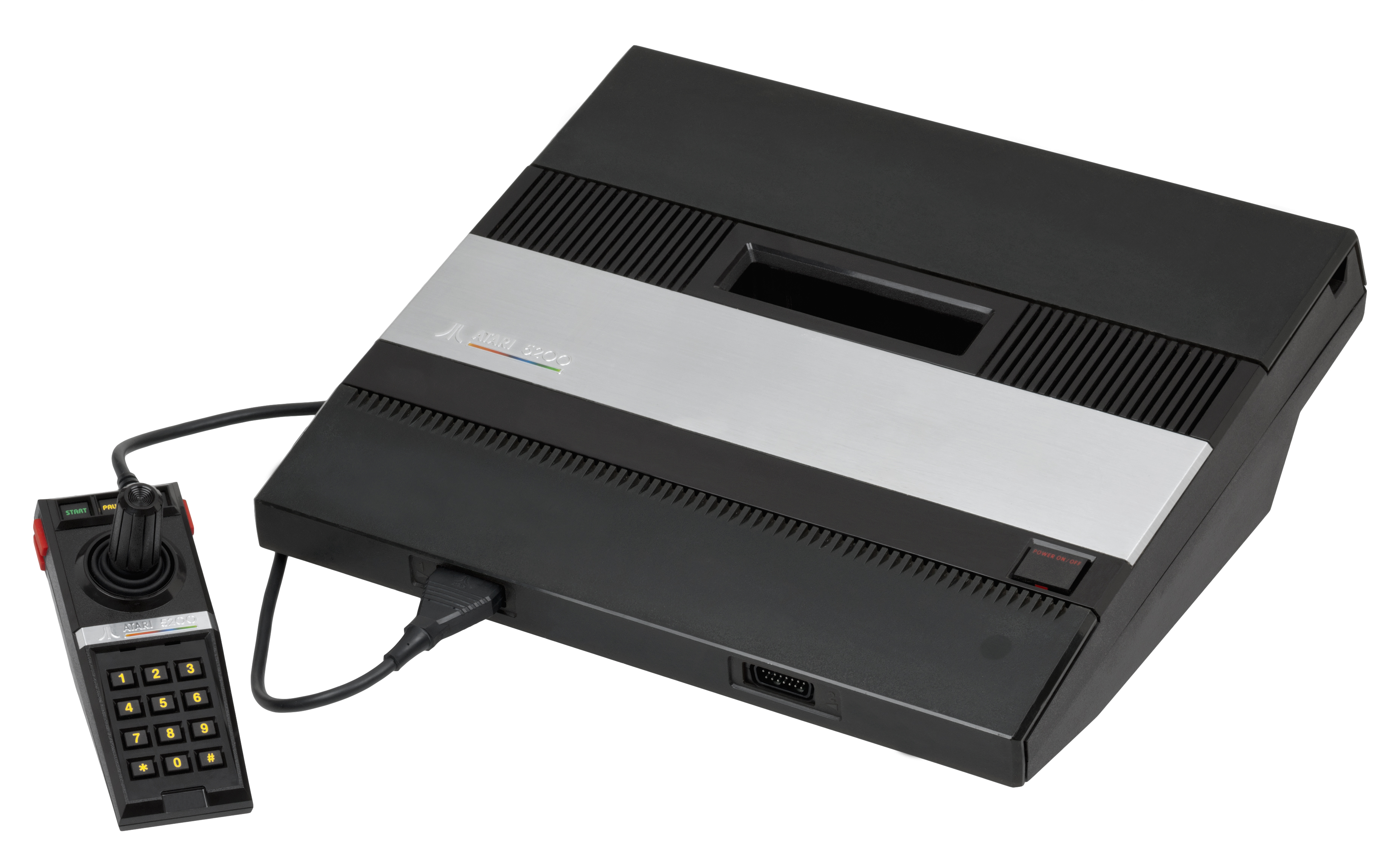
The second revision of the 5200

The original model of the system released in 1982 has four controller ports, compared to the two seen in most other consoles released at the time. The controllers have an analog joystick, numeric keypad, two fire buttons on each side of the controller, and three dedicated keys labeled "Start", "Pause", and "Reset". The 5200 also features an automatic TV switch box which allows the console to automatically switch from a regular TV signal to the console's video signal whenever the game system is turned on. Previous RF adapters, like those seen on the Atari 2600, had required the user to slide a switch on the adapter by hand to accomplish the same task. Power supply to the console is also handled through that same unique RF adapter. A single cable coming out of the 5200 plugs into the adapter and carries both electricity and video signal for the console.

A revision of the Atari 5200 released in 1983 removed two of the original model's four controller ports and reverted the system back to a separate more conventional power supply and standard RF adapter with no auto-switching. This hardware revision also altered the system's cartridge port to allow for compatibility with the system's Atari 2600 adapter, which released that same year. While the adapter was only designed to work with the 1983 revision of the system, modifications can be made to the console's original model to make it compatible with the adapter. In fact, towards the end of the original model's production run, a limited number of consoles were produced with these modifications included. These consoles can be identified by an asterisk in their serial numbers.

At one point following the 5200's release, Atari planned a smaller, cost-reduced version of the Atari 5200, which removed the console's controller storage bin. Code-named the "Atari 5100" (a.k.a. "Atari 5200 Jr."), only a few fully working prototypes were produced before the project was canceled.

=== Technical specifications ===
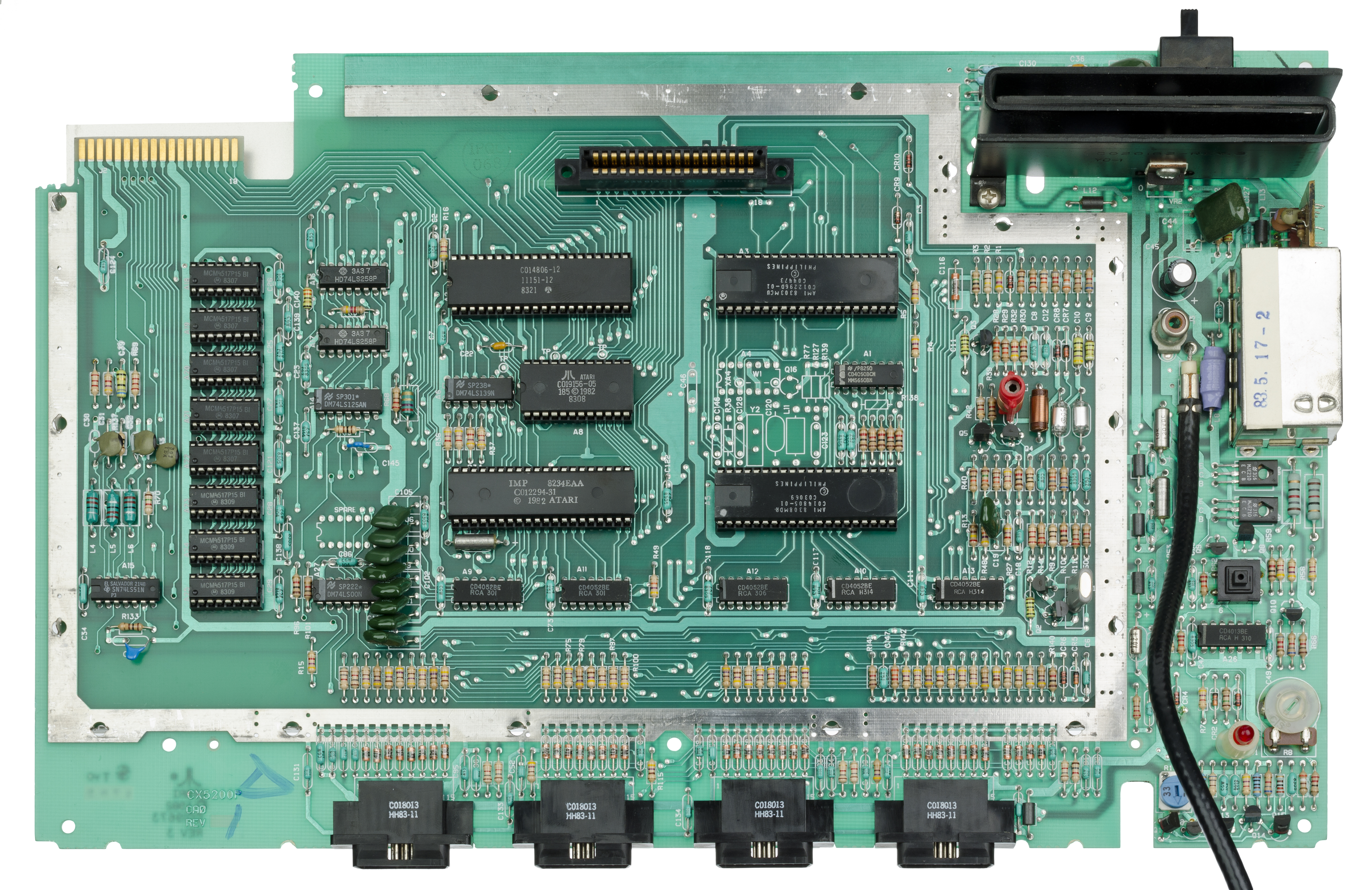
A first revision 5200's motherboard

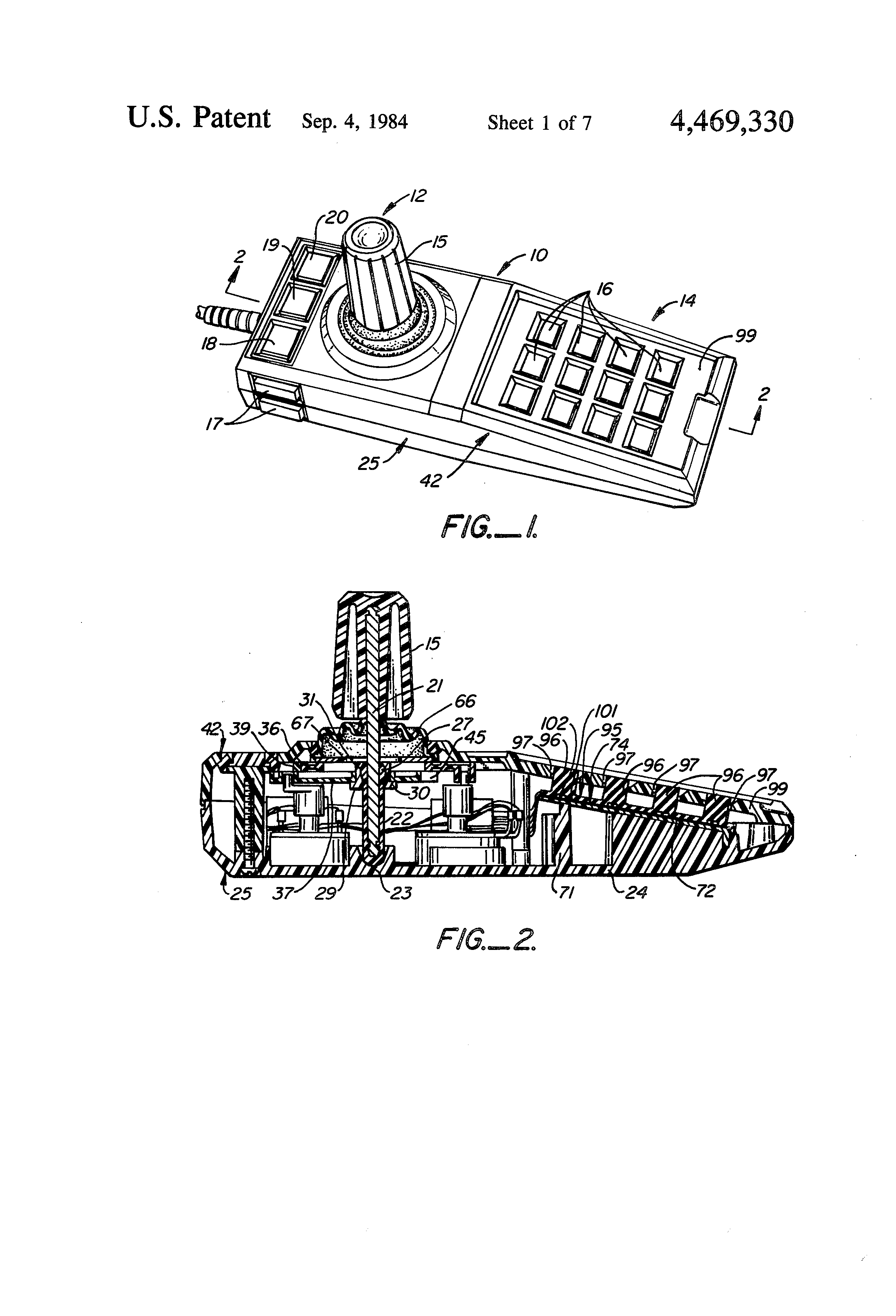
Joystick schematic from patent

- CPU: SALLY @ 1.79 MHz (Custom MOS Technology 6502)
- Graphics chips: ANTIC and GTIA
- Support hardware: 3 custom VLSI chips
- Screen resolution: 14 modes: Six text modes (8×8, 4×8, and 8×10 character matrices supported), Eight graphics modes including 80 pixels per line (16 color), 160 pixels per line (4 color), 320 pixels per line (2 color), variable height and width up to overscan 384×240 pixels
- Color palette: 128 (16 hues, 8 luma) or 256 (16 hues, 16 luma)
- Colors on screen: 2 (320 pixels per line) to 16 (80 pixels per line). Up to 23 colors per line with player/missile and playfield priority control mixing. Register values can be changed at every scanline using ANTIC display list interrupts, allowing up to 256 (16 hues, 16 luma) to be displayed at once, with up to 16 per scanline.
- Sprites: Four 8-pixel-wide sprites, four 2-pixel-wide sprites; height of each is either 128 or 256 pixels; 1 color per sprite
- Scrolling: Coarse and fine scrolling horizontally and vertically. (Horizontal coarse scroll 4, 8, or 16-pixel/color clock increments, and vertically by mode line height 2, 4, 8, or 16 scan lines.) (Or horizontal fine scroll 0 to 3, 7, or 15 single-pixel/color clock increments and then a 4, 8, or 16-pixel/color clock increment coarse scroll; and vertical fine scroll 0 to 1, 3, 7, or 15 scan line increments and then a 2, 4, 8, or 16 scan line increment coarse scroll)
- Sound: 4-channel PSG sound via POKEY sound chip, which also handles keyboard scanning, serial I/O, high resolution interrupt capable timers (single cycle accurate), and random number generation.
- RAM: 16 KB
- ROM:
  - 2 KB on-board BIOS for system startup and interrupt routing.
  - 32 KB ROM window for standard game cartridges, expandable using bank switching techniques.
- Dimensions: 13" × 15" × 4.25" (330.2 mm × 381 mm × 107.95 mm)

=== Controllers ===
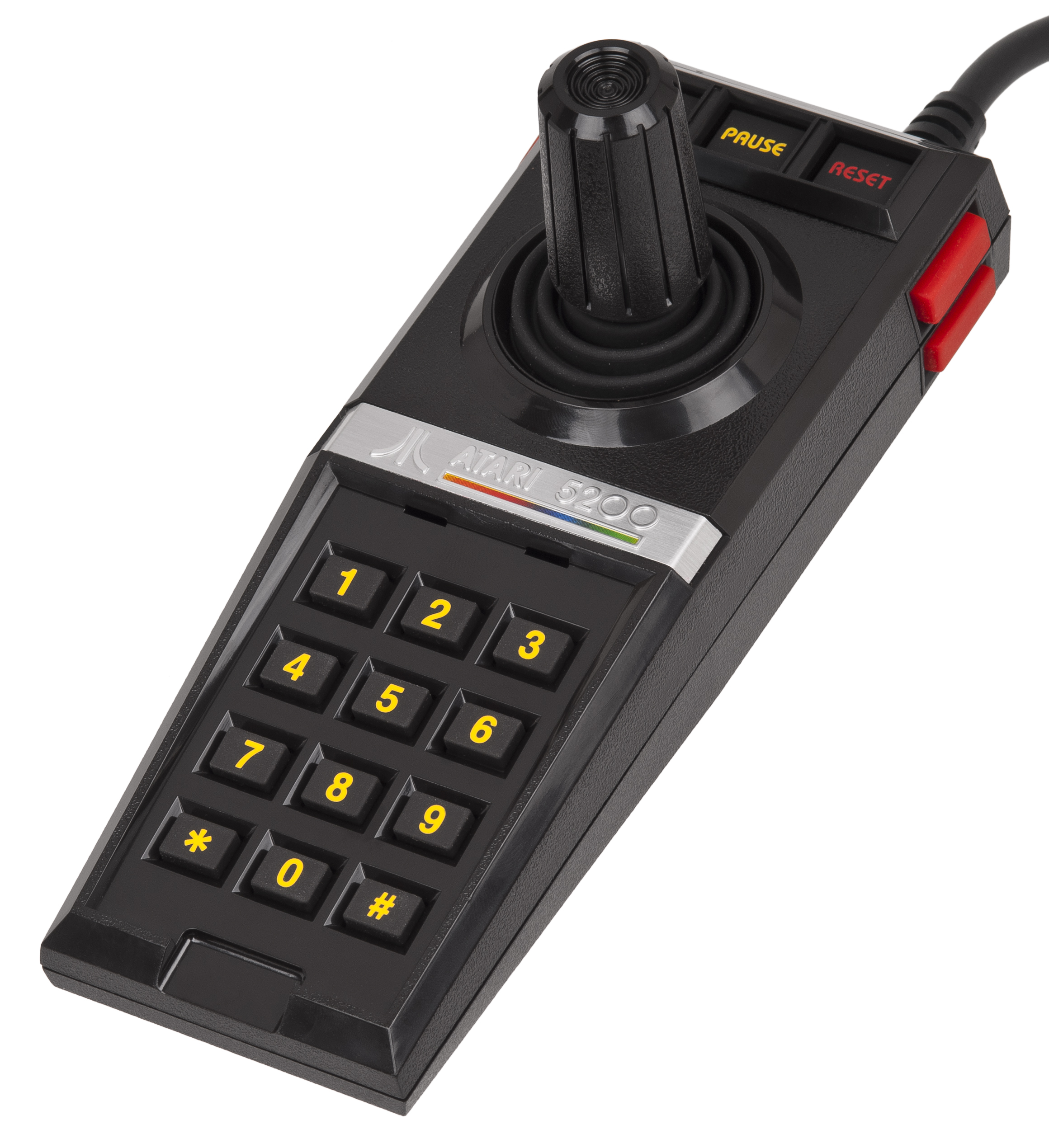
The Atari 5200 controller included with the console

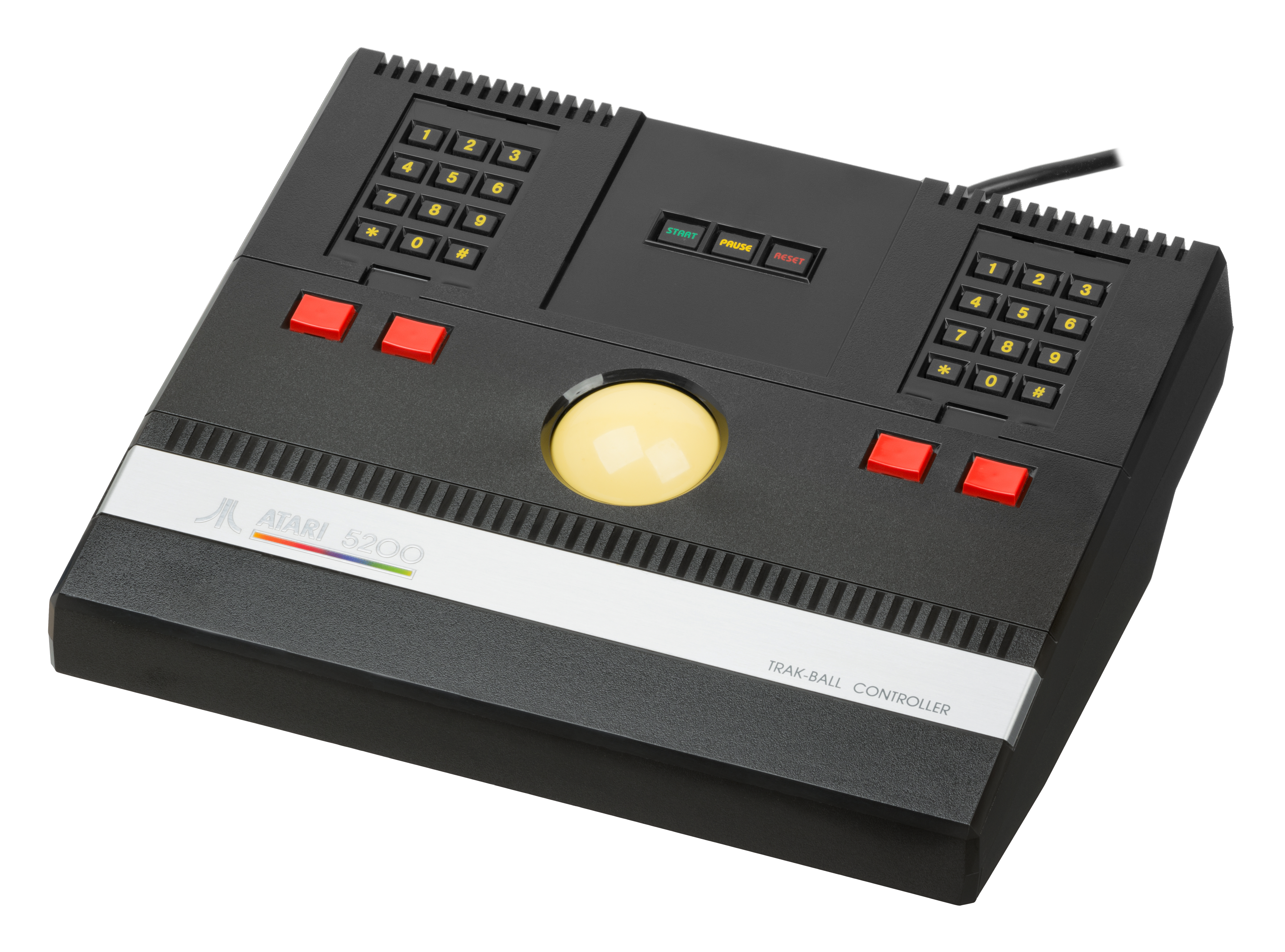
The Pro-Line Trak-Ball controller

The controller prototypes used in the electrical development lab employed a yoke-and-gimbal mechanism that came from an RC airplane controller kit. The design of the analog joystick, which used a weak rubber boot rather than springs to provide centering, proved to be ungainly and unreliable. They quickly became the Achilles' heel of the system due to the combination of an overly complex mechanical design and a very low-cost internal flex circuit system. Another major flaw of the controllers was that the design did not translate into a linear acceleration from the center through the arc of the stick travel. The controllers did, however, include a pause button, a unique feature at the time. Various third-party replacement joysticks were also released, including those made by Wico.

Atari Inc. released the Pro-Line Trak-Ball controller, which was used for games such as Centipede and Missile Command. A paddle controller and an updated self-centering version of the original controller were also in development, but never made it to market.

Games were shipped with plastic card overlays that snapped in over the keypad. The cards indicated which game functions, such as changing the view or vehicle speed, were assigned to each key.

The primary controller was ranked the 10th worst video game controller by IGN editor Craig Harris. An editor for Next Generation said that their non-centering joysticks "rendered many games nearly unplayable".

=== Differences from Atari 8-bit computers ===
David H. Ahl in 1983 described the Atari 5200 as "a 400 computer in disguise". Its internal design is similar to that of Atari 8-bit computers using the ANTIC, POKEY, and GTIA coprocessors. Software designed for one does not run on the other, but source code can be mechanically converted unless it uses computer-specific features. Antic magazine reported in 1984 that "the similarities grossly outweigh the differences, so that a 5200 program can be developed and almost entirely debugged [on an Atari 8-bit computer] before testing on a 5200". John J. Anderson of Creative Computing alluded to the incompatibility being intentional, caused by Atari's console division removing 8-bit compatibility to not lose control to the rival computer division.

Besides the 5200's lack of a keyboard, the differences are:

- The Atari computer 10 KB operating system is replaced with a simpler 2 KB version, of which 1 KB is the built-in character set.
- Some hardware registers, such as those of the GTIA and POKEY chips, are at different memory locations.
- The purpose of some registers is slightly different on the 5200.
- The 5200's analog joysticks appear as pairs of paddles to the hardware, which requires different input handling from the digital joystick input on the Atari computers.
- The SIO port was not present.
- An expansion edge connector located in the top left corner of the system. No accessories were released that utilized it.

In 1987, Atari Corporation released the XE Game System console, which is a repackaged 65XE (from 1985) with a detachable keyboard that can run home computer titles directly, unlike the 5200. Anderson wrote in 1984 that Atari could have released a console compatible with computer software in 1981.

== Reception ==
The Atari 5200 did not fare well commercially compared to its predecessor, the Atari 2600. While it touted superior graphics to the 2600 and Mattel's Intellivision, the system was initially incompatible with the 2600's expansive library of games, and some market analysts have speculated that this hurt its sales, especially since an Atari 2600 cartridge adapter had been released for the Intellivision II. In its list of the top 25 game consoles of all time, IGN claimed that the main reason for the 5200's market failure was the technological superiority of its main competitor, the ColecoVision. However, other sources maintain that the two consoles were released with roughly equivalent hardware capabilities.

Many of the 5200's games appeared simply as updated versions of 2600 titles, which failed to excite consumers. This lack of new games was due in part to a lack of funding, with Atari continuing to develop most of its games for the saturated 2600 market. The Atari 5200's pack-in title, Super Breakout, was criticized for not doing enough to demonstrate the system's capabilities. This gave the ColecoVision a significant advantage as its pack-in, Donkey Kong, delivered a more authentic arcade experience than any previous game cartridge.

The 5200 received much criticism for the "sloppy" design of its non-centering analog controllers. Anderson described the controllers as "absolutely atrocious".

David H. Ahl of Creative Computing Video & Arcade Games said in 1983 that the "Atari 5200 is, dare I say it, Atari's answer to Intellivision, Colecovision, and the Astrocade", describing the console as a "true mass market" version of the Atari 8-bit computers despite the software incompatibility. He criticized the joystick's imprecise control but said that "it is at least as good as many other controllers", and wondered why Super Breakout was the pack-in game when it did not use the 5200's improved graphics.

== Popular culture ==
Critical to the plot of the 1984 film Cloak & Dagger is an Atari 5200 game cartridge called Cloak & Dagger. The arcade version appears in the movie. In actuality the Atari 5200 version was started but never completed. The game was under development with the title Agent X when the movie producers and Atari learned of each other's projects and decided to cooperate. This collaboration was part of a larger phenomenon, of films featuring video games as critical plot elements (as with Tron and The Last Starfighter) and of video game tie-ins to the same films (as with the Tron games for the Intellivision and other platforms).

== See also ==
- List of Atari 5200 emulators
- Video game crash of 1983
