= The Dirty Dozen (filmmaking) =

Group of filmmaking students

The Dirty Dozen is the nickname for a group of filmmaking students at the USC School of Cinematic Arts within the University of Southern California during the mid-late 1960s. The main group consisted of budding directors, screenwriters, producers, editors, and cinematographers. Through innovative techniques and effects, they ended up achieving great success in the Hollywood film industry.

Also known as the "USC Mafia", the group's name was a reference to the 1967 Robert Aldrich-directed war film The Dirty Dozen.

== The core group ==
- George Lucas - Academy Award-nominated director, screenwriter, producer, creator of Star Wars and Indiana Jones
- John Milius - Academy Award-nominated screenwriter of Apocalypse Now and director of Conan the Barbarian
- Howard Kazanjian - producer of such films as Raiders of the Lost Ark, The Empire Strikes Back, and Return of the Jedi
- Walter Murch - Academy Award-winning film editor and sound editor of Apocalypse Now, The Conversation, The Godfather Part II, The English Patient, and Cold Mountain
- Hal Barwood - screenwriter
- Matthew Robbins - screenwriter and director of films such as Corvette Summer and Dragonslayer
- Randal Kleiser - director Grease, The Blue Lagoon, It's My Party
- Caleb Deschanel - Academy Award-nominated director of photography on The Right Stuff, The Natural, Fly Away Home, The Patriot, The Passion of the Christ and Never Look Away
- Robert Dalva - Academy Award-nominated editor of films such as Lions Love, The Black Stallion, Jumanji, Jurassic Park III, and Hidalgo
- Willard Huyck - Academy Award-nominated screenwriter of films such as American Graffiti
- Donald Glut - Writer of television animation series and of the novelization of The Empire Strikes Back

== Other affiliated members ==
- David S. Ward - Academy Award-winning screenwriter of The Sting, Major League, and Sleepless in Seattle
- William Phelps - director- North Shore
- Chuck Braverman - Academy Award-nominated producer
- Bill Couturié - Academy Award-winning producer
- Dan O'Bannon - screenwriter of Alien
- Basil Poledouris - composer
- John Carpenter - director of Halloween and The Thing

== Group projects ==
- THX 1138 - having evolved from an experimental short film called Electronic Labyrinth: THX 1138 4EB, this was George Lucas' first feature-length project as a director. It was co-written by Murch and released in March 1971.
- American Graffiti - after George Lucas dropped plans to produce a documentary on disc jockey Wolfman Jack, he was able to make a name for himself with American Graffiti, which was produced by friend and mentor Francis Ford Coppola. The film was co-written by Lucas, Huyck, and the latter's wife, Gloria Katz.
- Apocalypse Now - written by Milius and sound designed by Murch, and having established himself with the success of American Graffiti, George Lucas was originally set to direct the film in California as a low-budget, documentary-style feature. However, the complicated production process of Star Wars caused him to drop out.
- Corvette Summer
- Howard the Duck
- Radioland Murders
- Dark Star, directed by John Carpenter and written by Carpenter and Dan O'Bannon.
