= Dragon Hunt =

Dragon Hunt or variations may refer to:

- "Dragon Hunt", the first volume of Warcraft: The Sunwell Trilogy
- Dragon Hunter, 2003 manhwa series
- Dragon Hunter (Ninjago), a set of fictional characters in Ninjago
- Dragon Hunters, 2006 animated TV series
- Dragon Hunters (film), 2008 French film
- Dragonhunter (Hagenius brevistylus), a species of dragonfly
- Dragonhunt, 1982 fantasy board wargame
- Dragon Hunt (Shadowrun), a 1991 adventure for the role-playing game Shadowrun

== See also ==
- Dragon Slayer (disambiguation)
