= Dragonslayer (disambiguation) =

A dragonslayer is a person who slays dragons in mythology and fantasy.

Dragonslayer or Dragon Slayer may also refer to:

== Books ==
- The Dragonslayer, a book in the Bone series
- Dragon Slayers' Academy, a series of books
- Dragonslayer (novel), by Wayland Drew, a novelization of the 1981 film
- Dragonslayer, a book in the Wings of Fire novel series by Tui Sutherland

== Films ==
- Dragonslayer (1981 film), a 1981 fantasy movie starring Peter MacNicol
- Dragonslayer (2011 film), a documentary about skateboarder Josh "Skreech" Sandoval

== Games ==
- Dragonslayer (board game), a 1981 board game
- Dragon Slayer (series), a series of video games published by Nihon Falcom
  - Dragon Slayer (video game), the first game in the series, 1984
- The working title of role-playing game DragonQuest

== Music ==
- Dragonslayer (band), an English heavy metal band
- Dragonslayer, erroneously said to be the previous name of the band Slayer
- Dragonslayer (Dream Evil album), 2002
- Dragonslayer (Sunset Rubdown album), 2009
- "Dragon Slayer" (song), a 2014 song by Ninja Sex Party

== Other uses ==
- Dragonslayers (Martian Metals), a 1980 line of miniatures
- Dragon Slayer (roller coaster), located at Adventureland in Altoona, Iowa
- Coach (Survivor contestant) (born 1971), reality TV personality who refers to himself as the "Dragon Slayer"
- Dragon Slayer, a fictional sword wielded by Guts in the manga series Berserk
