= Hal Barwood =

American writer, game developer, and filmmaker (born 1940)

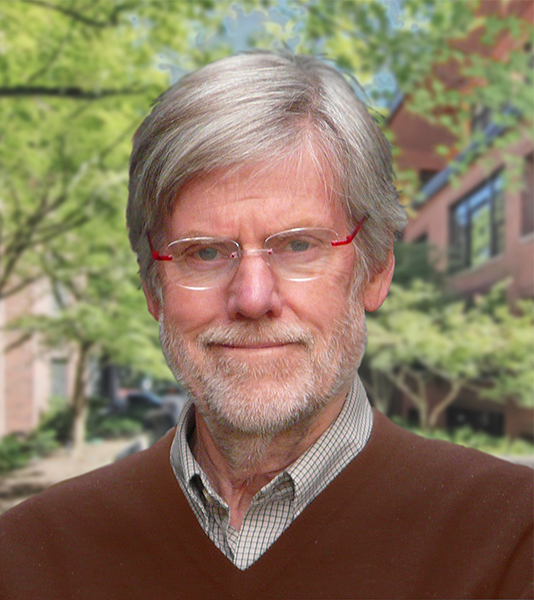
- Barwood in 2020
- Born: 16 April 1940 (age 86); Hanover, New Hampshire, U.S.
- Occupations: Novelist, video game developer, and screenwriter

Hal Barwood (born April 16, 1940) is an American screenwriter, film producer, film director, game designer, game producer, and novelist.

== Early life ==
Barwood was born in Hanover, New Hampshire, where his father ran the local movie theater. Early on he was thrilled by The Thing from Another World, and later in school Ingmar Bergman's The Seventh Seal. Both films possessed unique authorial personality and were important inspirations pointing him toward a filmmaking career. He studied art at Brown University and The Rhode Island School of Design; and later attended the University of Southern California's School of Cinema-Television, where he met and became friends with Matthew Robbins, along with other film students such as Walter Murch, Robert Dalva, George Lucas and others who came to be known by some as The Dirty Dozen, and who went on to considerable success in the film industry.

== Career ==
=== Film work ===
==== 1970s ====
In 1965, as a student, Barwood wrote, directed, and produced the short animated film, A Child's Introduction to the Cosmos, and in 1970, The Great Walled City of Xan. His first theatrical film work was briefly as an effects animator on George Lucas' debut feature film, the social science fiction film THX 1138 starring Donald Pleasence and Robert Duvall. THX 1138 was released in 1971, but it received mixed reviews from critics and became a box office bomb, although after Lucas' Star Wars, released in 1977, it became a cult classic.

Barwood's career path opened up when he and Matthew Robbins were hired to write the screenplay for Steven Spielberg's first theatrical feature film, the crime drama film The Sugarland Express starring Goldie Hawn, based on a real life incident about a married couple who are chased by police as the couple tries to regain custody of their baby. The Sugarland Express was released in 1974 but fared poorly at the box office (as it received a limited release), although it won the award for Best Screenplay at the 1974 Cannes Film Festival. He and Robbins later wrote John Badham's comedic sports film The Bingo Long Traveling All-Stars & Motor Kings, which was released in 1976 and received mixed to good reviews and a nomination for the American Film Institute's 2008 AFI's 10 Top 10 in the sports film category.

After Express, Robbins and Barwood wrote Joseph Sargent's biographical war film MacArthur, starring Gregory Peck and based on the life of the General of the Army Douglas MacArthur. The film was released in 1977 with mixed reviews. The screenwriting pair's next work with Spielberg was on his script of the science fiction film Close Encounters of the Third Kind after David Giler's rewrite didn't convince Spielberg. Barwood's and Robbins' major contribution to the script was to suggest a kidnapped child as the story's plot device. The two, under the orders of Spielberg, performed a convincing rewrite which impressed Spielberg. However, despite their contribution, neither Barwood nor Robbins were publicly credited for their work in the film, although they got a percentage and cameoed in the film itself as two World War II pilots. Close Encounters of the Third Kind was released in 1977 and became a critical and financial success, eventually grossing over $337 million worldwide. The next year, 1978, Robbins and Barwood wrote the adventure comedy film Corvette Summer, starring Mark Hamill. The film was released that year and received good reviews. In the 1970s, he also co-wrote an unproduced screenplay with Robbins called Home Free, for which Ralph McQuarrie was contracted to do a series of conceptual paintings.

==== 1980s ====
After Close Encounters, Barwood and Robbins collaborated again for the fantasy film Dragonslayer, starring Peter MacNicol, which Barwood co-wrote and produced. Dragonslayer was released in 1981 and received good reviews and despite its mediocre box office performance, it has since become a cult classic.

Later, in 1984, Barwood made his theatrical feature film directorial debut with the science fiction-horror film Warning Sign, starring Sam Waterston. The film was released in 1985 and received negative reviews although its box office performance was not so bad.

=== Video game work ===
While working on Dragonslayer, Barwood realized that he wanted to make video games in order to pursue his second childhood passion. Prior to becoming a professional video game designer, Barwood had previously created two video games for the Apple II (which he wrote and designed), entitled Binary Gauge and Space Snatchers. The first was self-published while the other was never published. Both of these titles are still available for PC play from his website, finitearts.com.

==== Work at LucasArts (1990–2003) ====
He was hired as a script writer, producer and director for LucasArts. Following the success of Indiana Jones and the Last Crusade: The Graphic Adventure, LucasArts initially wanted him to make a video game adaptation of Indiana Jones and the Monkey King, an unproduced script written by Chris Columbus during the early development of the third film, but Barwood considered the idea "substandard", so he convinced the staff to make an original story. Along with Noah Falstein, Barwood and the LucasArts staff ended up creating the 1992 adventure game Indiana Jones and the Fate of Atlantis, which was a success. In the game, Indiana Jones and his sidekick Sophia Hapgood travel around the world in order to find the legendary lost city of Atlantis before the Nazis can find it.

Due to the successful reception of Fate of Atlantis, Barwood helped Joe Pinney, Bill Stoneham, and Aric Wilmunder conceive a sequel to Fate entitled Indiana Jones and the Iron Phoenix, in which after World War II, Indiana Jones would need to defeat Neo-Nazis in order to prevent Adolf Hitler's resurrection in Bolivia with the Philosopher's Stone. However, the title was cancelled after LucasArts became aware that with how the story dealt with Neo-Nazism would affect the game's sales in Germany, which was an important overseas market for adventure games at that time. Still wanting to do one more Indiana Jones graphic adventure, Wilmunder wanted to do one entitled Indiana Jones and the Spear of Destiny, but it was also scrapped. Despite this, both the Iron Phoenix and the Spear of Destiny stories were later adapted into four-part comic books by Dark Horse Comics.

In 1995, Barwood worked on Big Sky Trooper and directed the live-action sequences of Star Wars: Rebel Assault II: The Hidden Empire, both released that same year and receiving mixed reviews. He later went to work in desktops games, Indiana Jones and His Desktop Adventures and Star Wars: Yoda Stories, released in 1996 and 1997 respectively. Both, casual games before there was such a category, were successful. After Yoda Stories, Barwood returned to make another Indiana Jones game. His original idea was to use the Roswell UFO incident as the story's plot device, but George Lucas prevented him from doing this, so he opted to make a new story. The game became Indiana Jones and the Infernal Machine, in which Indiana Jones, along with Sophia Hapgood, want to find the Infernal Machine, a mythological Babylonian power source, before the Soviets could do it. Infernal Machine, as being the series' first 3D installment video game, was released in 1999 and became a success like Fate of Atlantis. That same year, in August, PC Gamer magazine designated Barwood as one of the top 25 game designers in the United States.

Following the release of Infernal Machine, Barwood designed and presided over the development of RTX Red Rock and helped revise the story of Indiana Jones and the Emperor's Tomb, another Indiana Jones video game; it involves Indiana Jones searching the tomb of the Chinese emperor Qin Shi Huang before the Nazis and a Chinese Triad can find it. Both Red Rock and Emperor's Tomb were released in 2003, the former with negative reviews and the latter to critical acclaim. After the release of Emperor's Tomb, Barwood retired from making video games for LucasArts, although eight years later, he briefly returned in 2011 to work in cooperation with Zynga in the Facebook online video game Indiana Jones Adventure World, which was discontinued in 2012.

==== Finite Arts, Freelancing, and later games (2003–2011) ====
Following his departure from LucasArts in 2003, Barwood repurposed his former movie company, Finite Arts, to service his freelance projects. Among these were the PC games Phlinx to go and Zengems, released in 2005 and 2007. Both were well received.

In 2008–2009, Barwood served as the lead designer and writer on Mata Hari, a World War I spy action adventure game developed by German studio Cranberry Production. It received positive reviews. Also, in 2009, Barwood wrote parts of Mobster 2: Vendetta, the second installment of the Mobsters video game franchise which was released that same year.

=== Future projects ===
On April 3, 2017, during an interview with Arcade Attack, Barwood stated that although he liked very much working on Indiana Jones video games, he had no desire to make any new titles. However, he stated that he had finished his fourth novel and is currently writing his fifth novel, entitled Happenstance.

== Personal life ==
Barwood lives and works in Portland, Oregon. He was married to his childhood sweetheart, Barbara Ward, a teacher and literacy program director, until she died in 2023.

== Works ==
=== Filmography ===
Year	Title	Director	Writer	Producer	Notes
1965	A Child's Introduction to the Cosmos	Yes	Yes	Yes	Short student film
1970	The Great Walled City of Xan	Yes	Yes	Yes	Short student film
1974	The Sugarland Express		Yes		
1976	The Bingo Long Traveling All-Stars & Motor Kings		Yes		
1977	MacArthur		Yes		
1978	Corvette Summer		Yes	Yes	
1981	Dragonslayer		Yes	Yes	
1985	Warning Sign	Yes	Yes	Yes	Directorial debut

Other credits
Year	Title	Role
1971	THX 1138	Titles / animator
1975	Jaws	Uncredited writer
1977	Close Encounters of the Third Kind	Uncredited writer / Cameo as "Returnee #2 Flt. 19"

=== Video games ===
Year	Title	Director / Project leader	Writer	Game designer	Notes
1985	Binary Gauge	Yes	Yes	Yes	Apple 2 model railroading
1986	Space Snatchers of Aratoon	Yes	Yes	Yes	Apple 2 RPG
1992	Indiana Jones and the Fate of Atlantis	Yes	yes	yes	PC
1992	Indiana Jones and The Fate of Atlantis: The Action Game				platform ?
1995	Star Wars: Rebel Assault II: The Hidden Empire				directed video
1995	Big Sky Trooper	Yes	Yes	Yes	Nintendo SNES
1996	Indiana Jones and His Desktop Adventures	Yes	Yes	Yes	PC
1997	Star Wars: Yoda Stories	Yes	Yes	Yes	PC
1999	Indiana Jones and the Infernal Machine	Yes	Yes	Yes	PC
2003	RTX Red Rock	Yes	Yes	Yes	Playstation 2
2007	ZenGems			yes	freelance; PC
2008	Mata Hari		yes	yes	freelance; PC

=== Books ===
Year	Title	Writer	Publisher	Notes
2013	Shadowcop	Yes	Finite Arts	Golden Hills Crime #1
2014	Broomhandle	Yes	Finite Arts	Golden Hills Crime #2
2015	Whiskeyjack	Yes	Finite Arts	Golden Hills Crime #3
2016	Glitterbush	Yes	Finite Arts	The Starbots #1
2017	Happenstance	Yes	Finite Arts	standalone; crime
2018	Fulfillment	Yes	Finite Arts	standalone; life at a game studio
2020	Sandpeople	Yes	Finite Arts	The Starbots #2
2020	Answering The Emperor's Prayer	Yes	Finite Arts	standalone; for children
2021	Tinwoman	Yes	Finite Arts	The Starbots #3
2022	Cratertown	Yes	Finite Arts	standalone; science fiction
2023	Why The Moon Makes Men Mad	Yes	Finite Arts	standalone; for children
2024	A Child's Introduction to the Cosmos	Yes	Finite Arts	standalone; for children
2025	Shortsellers	Yes	Finite Arts	standalone; financial crime

=== Bibliography ===
- Dragonslayer: The Screenplay (2002) co-author (with Matthew Robbins)
- Shadowcop: a paranormal adventure (2013)
- Broomhandle: a paranormal adventure (2014)
- Whiskeyjack: a paranormal adventure (2015)
- Glitterbush: an astrobotanical adventure (2016) ISBN 9780998191409, 099819140X
- Happenstance: gambling on democracy (2017)
- Fulfillment: an aspirational adventure (2018)
- Sandpeople: an astromechanical adventure (2020)
- Answering The Emperor's Prayer (2020)
- Tinwoman: a biomechanical adventure (2021)
- Cratertown: a criminological adventure (2022)
- Why The Moon Makes Men Mad (2023)
- A Child' Introduction to the Cosmos (2024)
