= Delta Kappa Alpha =

Cinema society at the University of Southern California

- ΔΚΑ
- Founded: March 16, 1936; 90 years ago University of Southern California
- Type: Professional
- Affiliation: PFA
- Status: Active
- Emphasis: Cinematic arts
- Scope: National
- Motto: "Truth in Illusion"
- Slogan: Cinematic Artists of Character
- Colors: Deep royal blue Old gold
- Symbol: Movie camera
- Flower: White carnation
- Mascot: Dragon
- Publication: CineJournal
- Chapters: 21 (active)
- Nickname: DeKA
- Headquarters: 1179 Union Circle; Denton, Texas 76201; United States
- Website: www.dka.org

Delta Kappa Alpha (ΔΚΑ or DKA) is a national, gender-inclusive, professional cinematic society founded in 1936 at the USC School of Cinematic Arts in Los Angeles, California. The mission of DKA is to foster lifelong character, collaborative and creative storytelling, ethical and productive business practices, philanthropic action, and fraternal bonds by and between students of the cinematic arts.

== History ==
Delta Kappa Alpha was founded in 1935 as a Professional Cinematography Fraternity for men. DKA received its National Charter on March 16, 1936, in Bridge Hall of the University of Southern California (USC) in Los Angeles, California. Over 85 years later, the organization has evolved into a gender-inclusive society welcoming undergraduate and graduate students of any major who demonstrate a passion for creative collaboration in the cinematic arts.

Delta Kappa Alpha's ten founding members were Terry Bissinger, Allen K. Dallas, John W. Findlater, Donald Fischer, William A. Halpern, Peter Kinnel, Jack H. McClelland, Robert V. Rogers, Louis Tarleton, and Robert Turner. Dallas was the fraternity's first president.

The Alpha chapter had considerable influence in its first incarnation from 1936 until the mid-1980s. The fraternity had its own office within the School of Cinematic Arts building, equivalent to the current Student Production Office in today's SCA complex.

The fraternity also held annual banquets to honor notable contributors to the cinematic arts. Actors such as Sophia Loren, George Cukor, and Judy Garland were known to attend these events.

The fraternity was in its heyday in the 1960s and 1970s, when Dirty Dozen members George Lucas and Howard Kazanjian were among its members. There were five national chapters with a membership of 1500 in 1965. However, by the mid-1980s the Alpha chapter as well as other chapters in the United States and South America had disbanded. Despite no longer being on campus, USC still held a "DKA film series" of screenings from 1982 until the late 2000s at the Norris Cinema Theater on campus, drawing hour-long lines every Friday.

All of the chapters were deactivated because the national fraternity lacked an executive office, keeping it from surviving the anti-establishment period that shut down chapters and Greek organizations across the country. Former National President and National Secretary Herbert E. Farmer protected the fraternity’s history through his archive. This made it possible for the fraternity to be resurrected at the University of Southern California in 2009 by Grace Lee and Hillary Levi.

== Present ==
In the spring of 2009, a group of students at USC re-established the Alpha chapter. It has since grown to be the largest undergraduate student group at the School of Cinematic Arts, again encompassing all divisions of study and bringing guests such as Alan Myerson, John Landis, and John C. McGinley (on behalf of Spread the Word to End the Word) to campus as part of its DKA Speaker Series. In 2012, the national organization was revived. The first revived National Council was composed of Andy Dulman (President), Eric Foss (Vice President), and National Councilors Ryan Bartley, Arielle Zakowski, Shipra Gupta, and Flo Miniscloux. This new leadership worked diligently to create and ratify a national constitution and chapter bylaws, implement a structure for organization and growth, continuity, national identity, expansion to other campuses, and much more.

At the beginning of 2013, a group of students re-established the Delta chapter at UCLA after disbanding in the 1970s. Initially as a colony in January 2013, the Delta chapter became a fully fledged chapter in the spring of that year.

Delta Kappa Alpha chapters are organized into Resident Councils, which include the current student members of a chapter, and Graduate Councils, made up of all members who have graduated or left school. Each council of a chapter is entitled to a vote at the National Convention, which meets every two years and is the highest level of authority in the organization. The convention elects a National Council that serves as a board of directors for the society and governs between conventions. In the off-year when National Conventions are not held, a convention called "Conclave" is held. Its purpose is to further create community between the chapters and share ideas.

The national organization is made up of multiple corporations, including the Delta Kappa Alpha Foundation. The Delta Kappa Alpha Foundation was created in 2013 as a separate charitable organization. As a public, charitable, and educational foundation, the mission of the Delta Kappa Alpha Foundation is to ensure the development of philanthropic support necessary to sustain high levels of educational programming by fostering lifelong relationships and commitment to society's ideals. The key functions of the separate organization are rooted in the idea that the foundation must provide vehicles for members to fulfill their lifelong commitment to Delta Kappa Alpha and fellow members.

The Chief Executive Officer executes the National Council's plan and serves as a mediator between the Council and the Foundation Board. The Executive Offices staff assists with implementing said plan.

Delta Kappa Alpha's national partner is the Motion Picture & Television Fund (MPTF).

== Symbols ==
Delta Kappa Alpha's letters (DKA) stand for Dramatic, Kinematic, and Aesthetic. The society's colors are deep royal blue and old gold. Its symbol is the film camera and its mascot is the dragon. Its flower is the white carnation. Delta Kappa Alpha's public slogan is "Cinematic Artists of Character" and its open motto is "Truth in Illusion". The society nickname is DeKA, meaning "ten" in Greek and representing the 10 founders and the 10 jewels of a Delta Kappa Alpha member.

== Chapters ==
Following is a list of Delta Kappa Alpha collegiate chapters. Active chapters are indicated in bold. Inactive chapters are indicated in italics.

| Chapter | Charter date and range | Institution | Location | Status | Ref. |
|---|---|---|---|---|---|
| **Alpha** | March 16, 1936 – 19xx ?; 2007 | University of Southern California | Los Angeles, California | Active | |
| **Beta** | 1949 | Boston University | Boston, Massachusetts | Active | |
| **Gamma** | 1950 | New York University | New York, New York | Active | |
| **Delta** | December 6, 1953 | University of California, Los Angeles | Los Angeles, California | Active | |
| **Epsilon** | 2010 | San Francisco State University | San Francisco, California | Active | |
| **Zeta** | 2013 | Chapman University | Orange, California | Active | |
| **Eta** | 2013 | University of California, Berkeley | Berkeley, California | Active | |
| **Theta** | 2013 | Loyola Marymount University | Los Angeles, California | Active | |
| **Iota** | 2013 | George Mason University | Fairfax, Virginia | Active | |
| **Kappa** | 2013 | University of Tampa | Tampa, Florida | Active | |
| **Lambda** | 2013 | University of Texas at Austin | Austin, Texas | Active | |
| Mu | 2013–20xx ? | Columbia University | New York, New York | Inactive | |
| Nu | 2014–20xx ? | American University | Washington, D.C. | Inactive | |
| **Xi** | 2014 | University of Miami | Miami, Florida | Active | |
| **Omicron** | 2014 | Syracuse University | Syracuse, New York | Active | |
| **Pi** | 2014 | Ithaca College | Ithaca, New York | Active | |
| **Rho** | 2016 | Emerson College | Boston, Massachusetts | Active | |
| **Sigma** | 2016 | University of Arizona | Tucson, Arizona | Active | |
| **Tau** | 2017 | Depaul University | Chicago, Illinois | Active | |
| **Upsilon** | 2017 | University of California, Santa Barbara | Santa Barbara, California | Active | |
| **Phi** | 2017 | Cornell University | Ithaca, New York | Active | |
| **Chi** | 2018 | University of North Texas | Denton, Texas | Active | |
| **Psi** | 2018 | Temple University | Philadelphia, Pennsylvania | Active | |
| **Omega** | 2021 | Pennsylvania State University | State College, Pennsylvania | Active | |

== Notable members ==
Delta Kappa Alpha held an annual banquet that honored figures in the cinema industry and presented them with honorary membership in the fraternity. Honorees include:

- 1953 Arthur Charles Miller
- 1957 William A. Seiter
- 1957 Gene Kelly
- 1958 Cecil B. Demille
- 1959 George Cukor and John G. Frayne
- 1961 Greer Garson and Kirk Douglas
- 1963 Mary Pickford and Harold Lloyd
- 1964 Gloria Swanson, Adolph Zukor, Jack Lemmon, Charles Brackett, and Billy Wilder
- 1965 Rosalind Russell, Norman Taurog and Robert Wise
- 1966 Lucille Ball, Gregory Peck and Hal Wallis
- 1967 Irene Dunne and Jack Oakie
- 1968 Mae West, Mervyn LeRoy and James Stewart
- 1969 Conrad Hall and Kathryn Ross
- 1970 Julie Andrews and Norman Jewison
- 1972 Edith Head, Alfred Hitchcock, Walter Matthau and Sidney J. Solow (president of Consolidated Film Industries)
- 1973 Paul Newman, Joanne Woodward, Daniel Taradash and Lester Novros
- 1974 Barbara Stanwyck, Johnny Green and William Castle
- 1975 Fred Astaire and Stanley Donen
- 1976 Glenn Ford
- 1977 Albert Whitlock
- 1978 Disney's Nine Old Men and Neil Simon
- 1979 Russ Meyer

== See also ==
- Professional fraternities and sororities
