= Kochu TV =

Indian TV channel

- Country: India
- Broadcast area: India; Singapore; Middle East
- Network: Sun TV Network
- Headquarters: Thiruvananthapuram, Kerala, India.

Programming
- Language: Malayalam
- Picture format: 576i

Ownership
- Owner: Sun Group
- Sister channels: Chutti TV; Kushi TV; Chintu TV; Sun TV; Gemini TV; Surya TV; Udaya TV

History
- Launched: 16 October 2011; 15 years ago

Links
- Website: Official Website

Kochu TV is a 24-hour Malayalam language Kids pay television channel from the Sun TV Network in India.

== History ==
It was launched on 16 October 2011.

In 2024, rumours spread online that Kochu TV would cease operations. However, the Sun TV Network dismissed the claims as false.

== List of television series ==
- Happy Kid
- Jackie Chan Sahasangal
- Galli Galli Sim Sim
- Stuart Little
- Baalveer

=== Formerly broadcast ===
- Lilly
- Dorayude Prayanam (Dora The Explorer)
- Marsupilami
- The Pink Panther
- Mayakannan
- Toto Trouble
- Famous Five
- Mr. Cookies
- Fairy Tale Police Department
- Winx Club
- He-Man
- Avatar: The Last Airbender
- Dragon hunters
- Turning mecards

=== Films ===
- Harry Potter
- Tron Legacy
- Air Bud
- Air Force
- The Muppets
- Hotel Transylvania
- Smurfs 2
- Monster House
- The Water Horse
- Madly Madagascar
- Snow Queen

=== Fillers ===
- Help! My Supply Teacher’s Magic
