= Indiana Jones and His Desktop Adventures =

1996 video game

- The boxart for Indiana Jones and His Desktop Adventures features a still of Indiana Jones from Indiana Jones and the Temple of Doom.
- Developer: LucasArts
- Publisher: LucasArts
- Director: Hal Barwood
- Designers: Hal Barwood; Wayne Cline; Paul D. LeFevre; Tom Payne
- Programmer: Paul D. LeFevre
- Artist: Tom Payne
- Writers: Hal Barwood; Wayne Cline
- Composer: Clint Bajakian
- Platforms: Microsoft Windows, Apple Macintosh
- Release: April 1996
- Genre: Adventure
- Mode: Single-player

Indiana Jones and His Desktop Adventures is a 1996 adventure video game. Desktop Adventures was made to run in a windowed form on the desktop to limit memory use and allow the player to perform other tasks. This game was the first Desktop Adventures game, and was followed by Star Wars: Yoda Stories in 1997.

== Gameplay ==
Indiana Jones and His Desktop Adventures gameplay. Note the top-down view along with the directional arrows and round health meter in the lower right.

The game is set in mid-1930s Middle America with a variety of characters, puzzles, and outcomes. The plot, size, and direction of each game are randomly generated at the start, with locations and items being different every time. However each storyline has a pre-scripted resolution, with 15 different types of scenario in total, each designed to last for around an hour.

The playing area is displayed from an overhead perspective. The player-controlled Indiana Jones is limited to orthogonal movement, which is controlled with the arrow keys or with the mouse. The mouse is also used for other actions, such as managing inventory and using weapons. Each scenario is randomly generated by selecting each element (such as the item Indiana Jones must collect at each stage of the adventure) from a set of possibilities. After winning, the player can continue to explore the setting.

== Reception ==
Reception

Review scores
| Publication | Score |
|---|---|
| Computer Gaming World | 1/5 |
| GameSpot | 5.8/10 (PC) |
| Next Generation | 3/5 (MAC) |
| PC Games (DE) | 44% (PC) |
| PC Games (US) | C− (PC) |
| PC Zone | 8/10 (PC) |
| MacUser | 3/5 |

Trent Ward of GameSpot reviewed the game as having low-quality visuals and audio but being possibly useful for passing time. Billboard mentioned the game's randomly generated environment and its target audience of "gamers on the go", and deemed it "An unambitious title that will rope you in." A Next Generation reviewer noted that the randomly generated scenarios are essentially repetitive, and complained at the fact that the player character cannot shoot diagonally but enemies can. He concluded, "All this said, however, the game only costs around 12 bucks and if you don't expect too much, it is pretty fun. The underlying idea is sound, and if you don't mind repetition, check it out."

Charles Ardai of Computer Gaming World wrote, "For a genius, George Lucas sure has a lot of bad ideas. [...] Some time ago, someone from his computer game division must have come to him and said, 'Hey, let's put out a really simple, randomly generated RPG-style adventure game, stick a whip in the hand of the main character, use the Indiana Jones name–and make it look really ugly.' And Lucas must have said, 'Sounds good to me.'" Ardai wrote that Indiana Jones fans may enjoy the theme music featured in the game, but concluded that the game was "embarrassingly retro," with its "overly simplistic gameplay; crude visuals and sound" and "ludicrous ethnic stereotypes."

Rob Tribe of PC Zone called it "very, very addictive," though like Next Generation, he criticized the fact that the player character cannot shoot diagonally but enemies can. Shane Mooney of PC Games found it repetitive and expected a better game from LucasArts.

In 1996, Computer Gaming World declared Indy's Desktop Adventures the 15th-worst computer game ever released.
