= Mata Hari (video game) =

2008 video game

- European cover art
- Developer: Cranberry Production
- Publishers: EU: DTP Entertainment; NA: Viva Media
- Designers: Hal Barwood; Noah Falstein
- Programmer: Matthias Meyer
- Artist: Oliver Specht
- Platform: Microsoft Windows
- Release: GER: November 21, 2008; NA: July 2009; UK: March 26, 2010
- Genre: Adventure
- Mode: Single-player

Mata Hari is an adventure video game. It was released on November 21, 2008, in German-speaking territories. The game was worked on by ex-LucasArts alumni Hal Barwood and Noah Falstein.

== Plot ==
Real-life Mata Hari embarks on a fictional adventure in which she becomes a spy and uncovers sensitive military secrets, all in the midst of the outbreak of World War I.

== Gameplay ==
Primarily a point and click adventure game, the title also includes various minigames. For instance players have to perform exotic dances in order to earn money. The game allowed players to skip these dance-oriented sections.

== Development ==
The game was developed by Hanover-based studio 4Head Studio/Cranberry Production. DTP Entertainment published the game worldwide on its Anaconda label. A press release on April 26, 2007, listed a release date of Q1 2008 for Germany, Switzerland and Austria.

The core idea, a spy game with Mata Hari at the turn of the last century, was created by Christopher Kellner and Marc Buro. Buro, a producer at DTP, approached both Barwood and Falstein separately and pitched them a game based on Mata Hari, which after discussing the opportunity, felt was "right up our alley". The duo agreed to collaborate on the project. Barwood and Falstein were the principal designers, and fleshed out the core idea into a full-fledged game. The 4Head Studio team was led by Tobias Severin, Matthias Meyer, and Oliver Specht.

The duo, who both lived in California, were able to discuss the game at a local cafe. However, they also began to have long Skype conversations between California, Hannover and Hamburg. In August 2007, Barwood and Falstein attended a series of meetings in Hannover to review and fine-tune the design.

== Critical reception ==
Adventure Archiv thought that the game was short at a play time of ten hours. Adventure Treff wrote that reading the Wikipedia article of the subject of the game was more exciting than playing the game, and notes the game developers should have read it too prior to making the game. Adventure Corner felt the game's story was littered with plot holes. Game Captain felt the game came across as simple and superficial. Adventures Unlimited thought the game fell below expectations. Jeux Video described the title as one that exudes freshness, maturity and remarkable intelligence.
