= Chris Enss =

American author and screenwriter (born 1961)

Chris Enss (born 1961) is an American author and screenwriter. Enss has written more than 50 books on the subject of women in the Old West, and has collaborated with producer Howard Kazanjian on several books, including two about Roy Rogers and Dale Evans.

== Selected works ==
- With Great Hope: Women of the California Gold Rush (with JoAnn Chartier) (2000)
- Love Untamed: Romances of the Old West (with JoAnn Chartier) (2002)
- Gilded Girls: Women Entertainers of the Old West (with JoAnn Chartier) (2003)
- The Cowboy and the Señorita: A Biography of Roy Rogers and Dale Evans (with Howard Kazanjian) (2004)
- She Wore a Yellow Ribbon: Women Soldiers and Patriots of the Western Frontier (with JoAnn Chartier) (2004)
- Playing for Time: The Death Row All Stars (2004)
- Happy Trails: A Pictorial Celebration of the Life and Times of Roy Rogers and Dale Evans (with Howard Kazanjian) (2005)
- Hearts West: True Stories of Mail-Order Brides on the Frontier (2005)
- Buffalo Gals: Women of Buffalo Bill's Wild West Show (2005)
- How the West Was Worn: Bustles and Buckskins on the Wild Frontier (2005)
- The Doctor Wore Petticoats: Women Physicians of the Old West (2006)
- Pistol Packin' Madams: True Stories of Notorious Women of the Old West (2006)
- The Young Duke: The Early Life of John Wayne (with Howard Kazanjian) (2006)
- Tales Behind the Tombstones: The Deaths and Burials of the Old West's Most Nefarious Outlaws, Notorious Women and Celebrated Lawmen (2007)
- The Lady Was a Gambler: True Stories of Notorious Women of the Old West (2007)
