= Wayland Drew =

Canadian writer

Wayland Miller Drew
- Born: December 9, 1932; Oshawa, Ontario
- Died: December 3, 1998 (aged 65); Bracebridge, Ontario

Wayland Drew (1932–1998) was a writer born in Oshawa, Ontario. He earned a BA in English Language and Literature from Victoria College at the University of Toronto in 1957, and began a teaching career in 1961 at the high school in Port Perry, Ontario. He later went on to teach in Bracebridge and Muskoka Lakes, in addition to stints at the Ontario Ministry of Education, before retiring in 1994. He married Gwendolyn Parrott in 1957; they had four children.

Drew began to write seriously in high school and published a number of short stories (to magazines such as The Tamarack Review) and non-fiction pieces throughout his career, while also selling radio and film scripts. His first novel (and sometimes stated to be his best) was The Wabeno Feast (1973). While rooted in Northern Ontario, the story indicted modern industrial civilization as an extension of the European colonization of Canada by depicting an entire society's fall into ruin. In her essay on "Canadian Monsters: Some Aspects of the Supernatural in Canadian Fiction", Margaret Atwood noted that Drew's use of the aboriginal wabeno revealed a concern "with man's relationship to his society and to himself, as opposed to his relationship with the natural environment" and she concluded that Drew's novel combined "both concerns in a rather allegorical and very contemporary fashion".

Many readers, though, surely know him better as the author of an ecological science fiction trilogy, the Erthring Cycle (1984-1986), and of several movie novelizations (Corvette Summer, Dragonslayer, *batteries not included, and Willow, the last three of which were translated into French and the second in German). His non-fiction also reflected his concern for the environment and interest for Canadian landscapes, as seen in books such as Superior: The Haunted Shore and A Sea Within: The Gulf of St. Lawrence. His ultimate novel, Halfway Man (1989), expanded on themes from his first.

== Bibliography ==
=== Fiction ===
- The Wabeno Feast (novel, Anansi, 1973; General Paperbacks, 1985; House of Anansi Press, 2001)
- Wood, in 74 new Canadian stories. Oberon Pr, Ottawa 1974 ISBN 0887501273
  - in German, transl. Klaus Schultz: Holz, in Erkundungen. 26 kanadische Erzähler. Volk & Welt, Berlin 1986, pp 230 – 240
- Corvette Summer (movie novelization, New American Library of Canada, 1978)
- Dragonslayer (movie novelization, Ballantine Book, 1981, 1985; Fontana/Collins, 1982)
- Batteries not included (movie novelization, Berkley Books, 1987)
- Willow (movie novelization, Ballantine Books, 1988)
- Halfway Man (novel, Oberon Press, 1989)

==== The Erthring Cycle ====
- The Memoirs of Alcheringia (novel, Ballantine, 1984)
- The Gaian Expedient (novel Ballantine, 1985)
- The Master of Norriya (novel, Ballantine Books, 1986)
- The Erthring Cycle (omnibus, "Book Club Edition", Nelson Doubleday, 1986)

=== Nonfiction ===
- The Nature of Mammals. The Illustrated natural history of Canada (Natural Science of Canada, 1974, 1975) (with others)
- The Nature of Fish. The Illustrated natural history of Canada (Natural Science of Canada, 1974, 1975) (with others)
- Superior: The Haunted Shore (Gage, 1975; Macmillan of Canada, 1983; Beaufort Books, 1983; Firefly Books, 1995) (in collaboration with photographer Bruce M. Litteljohn)
- Browns' Weir (Oberon Press, 1983) (with Gwendolyn Drew)
- A Sea Within: The Gulf of St. Lawrence (McClelland & Stewart, 1984) (in collaboration with photographer Bruce M. Litteljohn)
