= Star Wars: Yoda Stories =

1997 video game

- North American Windows box art
- Developers: LucasArts; Torus Games (Game Boy Color)
- Publishers: LucasArts; THQ (Game Boy Color)
- Director: Hal Barwood
- Designers: Hal Barwood; Mark Crowley
- Programmer: Mark Crowley
- Writer: Hal Barwood
- Series: Star Wars
- Platforms: Windows, Game Boy Color
- Release: Windows: NA: March 12, 1997; Game Boy Color: NA: December 23, 1999
- Genre: Adventure
- Mode: Single-player

Star Wars: Yoda Stories is a 1997 adventure video game based on the Star Wars franchise, developed by LucasArts. The game is the second and last title in LucasArts' Desktop Adventures series, preceded by Indiana Jones and His Desktop Adventures. The game was released in March 1997 for Microsoft Windows and ported to Game Boy Color by Torus Games in December 1999.

== Gameplay ==
Yoda Stories is a point and click adventure game in the vein of early Windows titles.

Yoda Stories is a short, procedurally generated point-and-click adventure game designed for players to finish in an hour. The game has no central plot or ultimate goal. Each time a new game is started, the player is tasked to complete a random mission. This may include rescuing another Star Wars character, obtaining an object, warning the Rebels of an attack, or destroying an Imperial facility.

The player controls Luke Skywalker from a bird's eye perspective. Players move Luke across a 2D grid, equip and use weapons to defeat enemies; push and pull certain objects; and collect items into their inventory to be used later on. Each mission takes place on a new procedurally generated planet, and requires the player to complete a series of item-based puzzles, either by pushing or pulling obstacles to reveal items, using items acquired elsewhere to unlock a new item, or defeating enemies in an area. Once the final puzzle is solved and the mission is accomplished, the player is given a score based on their performance, and may choose to replay the mission or start a new game.

== Reception ==
Reception

Review scores
Publication	Score
Computer Gaming World	1/5 (PC)
IGN	2/10 (GBC)
PC PowerPlay	64% (PC)
Science Fiction Weekly	A−
PC Gamer	80%

The PC version of Yoda Stories was received poorly. Robert Coffey of Computer Gaming World derided the game as "really bad" and "graphically dated, featuring cookie-cutter worlds filled with big-headed, cutesified characters and silly monsters that are (almost) flat-out embarrassing"; a 2003 mention opined that "Yoda stories makes solitaire, or death, look like a good time." GameSpot provided similar criticisms of the game as a "half-hearted product", stating "combat is awkward and in no way satisfying" and "the backgrounds are as flat and lifeless as the gameplay". Gareth Jones of PC PowerPlay provided some praise for the game as "cute (and) fun, with plenty of lastability", praising its addictive nature.

The Game Boy version of Yoda Stories received more negative reviews. Craig Harris of IGN stated the game was "one of the technically lamest and structurally annoying Game Boy games ever developed", singling out the poor graphics, animations, sound, and controls. Yoda Stories remains IGN's lowest-rated Game Boy Color title.

Retrospective assessments of the game have been mixed. Inverse writer Brian Vanhooker supported the game as "easygoing and accessible", and interviewed lead designer Hal Barwood, who considered that the game was "ahead of its time and (that) its rough reception was unwarranted", as reviewers misinterpreted its purpose as a casual game. Richard Cobbett of PC Gamer noted that the Desktop Adventures series "(had) a fair amount of promise", although the game suffers from "a lack of assets and a lack of content".
