= Howard Kazanjian =

American film producer (born 1942)

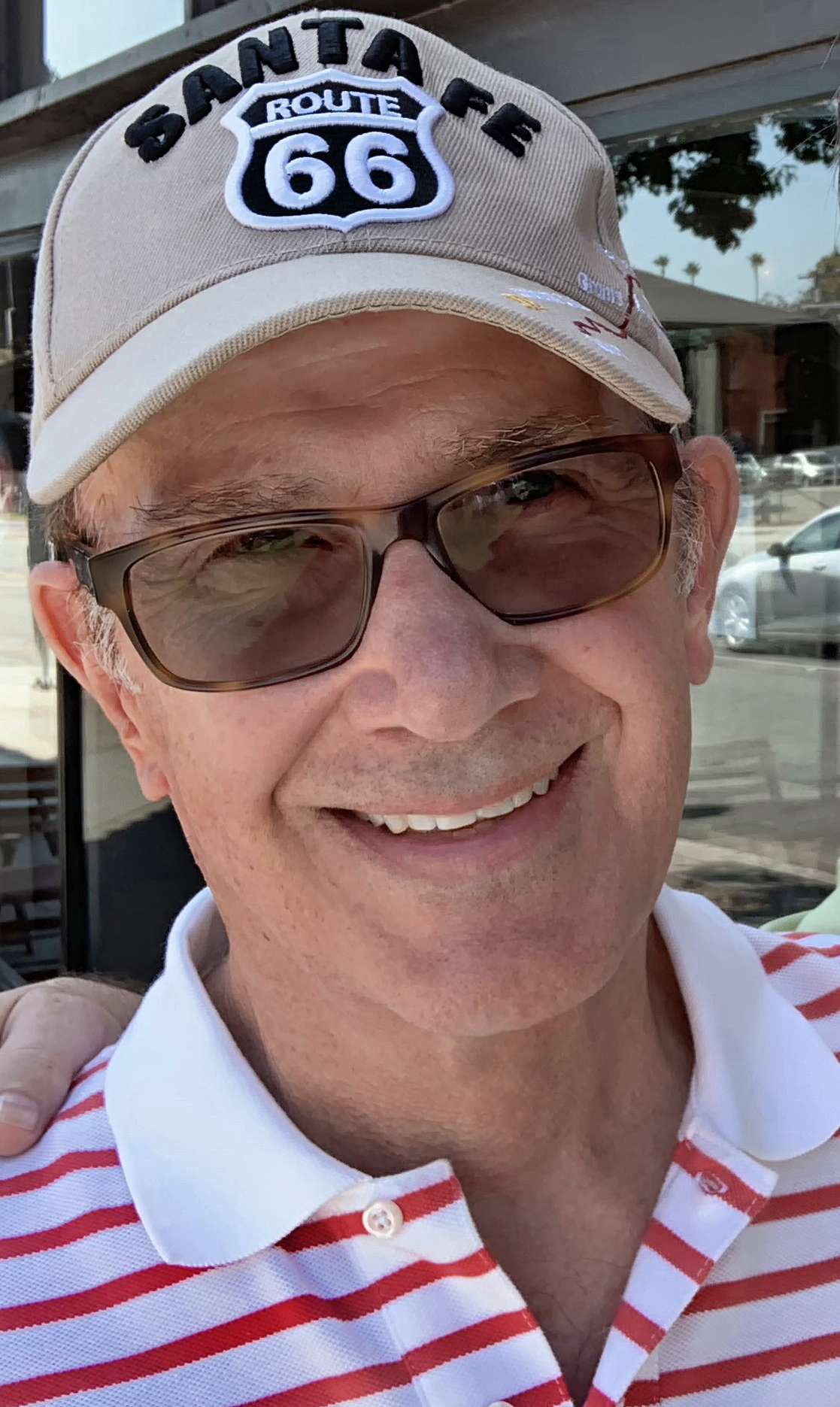
- Kazanjian in 2019
- Born: Howard G. Kazanjian; July 26, 1942 (age 84); Los Angeles County, California, U.S.
- Education: University of Southern California
- Occupations: Film producer, author
- Years active: 1968–present
- Spouse: Carol Anne Eskijian (m. 1970)
- Children: 3

Howard Kazanjian (born July 26, 1942) is an American film producer best known for the Star Wars films The Empire Strikes Back and Return of the Jedi, as well as the Indiana Jones movie Raiders of the Lost Ark. Kazanjian was an originating member of Lucasfilm, Ltd., serving as its vice president for approximately eight years (1977 to 1984).

Kazanjian is a published non-fiction author, with a focus on the factual Old West of US history. In 2021, Kazanjian also published his well-received 340-page memoir Howard Kazanjian: A Producer's Life, edited and compiled by prolific Star Wars historian J.W. Rinzler.

== Early life ==
Kazanjian was born in Los Angeles County, California, and is of Armenian descent. His father was born in Tigranakert (Diyarbakır), while his mother was born in Pasadena. He graduated from the University of Southern California. While there he first met a young George Lucas, and they became not only Delta Kappa Alpha cinema fraternity brothers but also long standing friends. They were members of a clique of filmmakers known to the Hollywood system and the university circuit as The Dirty Dozen. During those college years, Kazanjian and Lucas both met their respective future wives, and the couples would often double date.

Kazanjian's early credits include being First Assistant Director on Alfred Hitchcock's Family Plot and Second Assistant Director on Sam Peckinpah's The Wild Bunch. He later worked with director Robert Wise on his production of The Hindenburg. Kazanjian eventually moved into film production rather than directorial work. He later stated, "The films offered to me I don't want to direct. The films I want to direct are not offered."

== Lucasfilm ==
As Lucasfilm's Vice President of Production, Howard Kazanjian was intimately involved in the day-to-day strategic and practical operations of Lucasfilm during the times immediately after the 1977 release of Star Wars until approximately 1984 or 1985.

== Star Wars and Indiana Jones ==
Kazanjian is most notable for having served as executive producer on Raiders of the Lost Ark and producer on Return of the Jedi. He is also recognized as an uncredited producer on The Empire Strikes Back, replacing producer Gary Kurtz midway through the production. For Jedi he came up with the idea of shooting the production under a fake name, Blue Harvest, in order to forestall any attempts at price gouging by suppliers. Blue Harvest was purported to be a horror film with the tag line "horror beyond imagination". Hats and T-shirts were printed up for the crew to wear and to further add to the authenticity of the ruse.

During the casting of Raiders, Kazanjian heavily campaigned for Harrison Ford to be cast as Indiana Jones, to the point he almost lost his job over it. Jones was intended to be a smoker and a drinker, but Kazanjian convinced Lucas and Steven Spielberg to remove that. The scene where sunlight passing through the Headpiece to the Staff of Ra reveals the location of the Well of the Souls was proposed by Kazanjian, who was inspired by the golden statues of Ramesses II at the Abu Simbel temples in Egypt. The temple was positioned so that sunlight would penetrate the sanctuary and illuminate the statues once a year.

The issue of whether Ford would reprise his role of Han Solo for the third Star Wars film arose during pre-production. Kazanjian was responsible for getting him to return:

I played a very important part in bringing Harrison back for Return of the Jedi. Harrison, unlike Carrie Fisher and Mark Hamill signed only a two picture contract. That is why he was frozen in carbonite in The Empire Strikes Back. When I suggested to George we should bring him back, I distinctly remember him saying that Harrison would never return. I said what if I convinced him to return. George simply replied that we would then write him in to Jedi. I had just recently negotiated his deal for Raiders of the Lost Ark with Phil Gersh of the Gersh Agency. I called Phil who said he would speak with Harrison. When I called back again, Phil was on vacation. David, his son, took the call and we negotiated Harrison's deal. When Phil returned to the office several weeks later he called me back and said I had taken advantage of his son in the negotiations. I had not. But agents are agents.

The ending scene of Return of the Jedi was originally only going to show the Force ghosts of Obi-Wan Kenobi and Yoda, but two days before the scene was shot, Kazanjian suggested that the ghost of Anakin Skywalker appear as well.

== Later years ==
Kazanjian has authored books with Chris Enss. In 2004, they collaborated on The Cowboy and the Senorita: A Biography of Roy Rogers and Dale Evans ISBN 0-7627-3053-6 and Happy Trails: A Pictorial Celebration of the Lives of Roy Rogers and Dale Evans ISBN 0-7627-3089-7; In 2006, The Young Duke: The Early Life of John Wayne ISBN 0-7627-3898-7; in 2009, Thunder over the Prairie: The True Story of a Murder and a Manhunt by the Greatest Posse of All Time ISBN 0-7627-4493-6.

He has been an instructor at "Act One", a group designed to train Christians entering into film and television, and was named by Beliefnet as one of the twelve most powerful Christians in Hollywood.

Kazanjian is an active member of the Armenian charity and cultural community, and a USC alumnus.

Since 1998, Kazanjian has been co-chairman and 50% shareholder of Tricor Entertainment, Inc, an independent production company, which owns and operates a 19,000+ seat theater chain in Southeast Asia and a film distribution company.

In 2023, Kazanjian attended book signing events hosted by Armenian Film Society.

== Personal life ==
Kazanjian lives and works in the community of San Marino, California with his wife Carol (née Eskijian), and three children, Peter, Noah, and Andrew.

As of 2010, Kazanjian and George Lucas remain close friends.

== Filmography ==
He was producer for all films unless otherwise noted.

=== Film ===
Year	Film	Credit	Notes
1979	More American Graffiti		
1980	The Empire Strikes Back		a.k.a. Star Wars: Episode V - The Empire Strikes Back
1980	The Empire Strikes Back		Uncredited
1981	Raiders of the Lost Ark	Executive producer	a.k.a. Indiana Jones and the Raiders of the Lost Ark
1983	Return of the Jedi		a.k.a. Star Wars: Episode VI - Return of the Jedi
1990	The Rookie		
1993	Demolition Man		
1999	The Sky Is Falling	Executive producer	
1999	Carlo's Wake	Executive producer	
2000	The Amati Girls	Executive producer	
2001	Extreme Days	Executive producer	
2001	The Homecoming of Jimmy Whitecloud	Executive producer	
2003	Shortcut to Happiness	Executive producer	
2004	The Bridge of San Luis Rey	Executive producer	
2004	Worlds Apart	Supervising producer	
2017	South Dakota	Executive producer	

Second unit director or assistant director

Year	Film	Role	Notes
1967	The Cool Ones	Assistant director	Uncredited
1968	Finian's Rainbow	Assistant director	
1969	The Wild Bunch	Second assistant director	Uncredited
1969	The Great Bank Robbery	Second assistant director	
1969	Once You Kiss a Stranger	Assistant director	
1970	The Christine Jorgensen Story	Assistant director	
1974	The Girl from Petrovka	First assistant director	
1974	The Front Page	First assistant director	
1975	The Hindenburg	First assistant director	
1976	Family Plot	First assistant director	

Miscellaneous crew

Year	Film	Role
1977	Rollercoaster	Production executive

Thanks

Year	Film	Role
2001	All Over Again	Special thanks
2009	Sutures	Very special thanks
2016	Christmas Ranch	The producers wish to thank
2021	Hope's Legacy	The producers wish to thank

As an actor

Year	Film	Role	Notes	Ref.
1983	Return of the Jedi	Pilot	a.k.a. Star Wars: Episode VI - Return of the Jedi	
1983	Return of the Jedi	Pilot	Voice role	

=== Television ===
Year	Title	Credit	Notes
1996	Rattled	Executive producer	Television film
1995−96	JAG		
2005−06	Danger Rangers	Executive producer	
2016−17	Mark Hamill's Pop Culture Quest	Executive producer	Documentary
2017	Celebrate the World! The Hey Wordy! Movie	Executive producer	Television film

Second unit director or assistant director

Year	Title	Role	Notes
1973	Trapped	Assistant director	Television film
1974	The Rockford Files	Assistant director	Television pilot

== Awards and honors ==
- 1982 Primetime Emmy Award for Outstanding Informational Series or Special for The Making of Raiders of the Lost Ark
- 1982 Inkpot Award winner
- 2009 Briner Impact Award
- On June 8, 2009, Howard Kazanjian was deputized as an Honorary Marshal of Dodge City, Kansas.
