= Robert Dalva =

American film editor, cinematographer, and director (1942–2023)

- Born: April 14, 1942; New York, New York, U.S.
- Died: January 27, 2023 (aged 80); Larkspur, California, U.S.
- Education: Colgate University; Syracuse University; USC School of Cinematic Arts
- Occupations: Film editor, cinematographer, director

Robert John Dalva (April 14, 1942 – January 27, 2023) was an American film editor, cinematographer, and director. He was nominated for an Academy Award for Best Film Editing for his work on The Black Stallion (1979).

== Early life and education ==
Dalva was born in New York City. He studied English literature at Colgate University, where he was a member of the Phi Kappa Tau fraternity. From there, he studied filmmaking at Syracuse University and the USC School of Cinematic Arts, where he was one of a core group of successful filmmakers known as "The Dirty Dozen". After graduating, he worked for the US Information Agency with Verna Fields.

== Career ==
=== Editing ===
Dalva's first professor editing credit was of the experimental art film Lions Love (1969), directed by Agnès Varda. He was an early member of Francis Ford Coppola's American Zoetrope.

In 1979, he edited The Black Stallion, which earned him an Oscar nomination for Best Film Editing. His subsequent editing credits included Raising Cain, Jumanji, The Joy Luck Club, Jurassic Park III, Hidalgo, The Prize Winner of Defiance, Ohio, Captain America: The First Avenger, and Lovelace. He was elected to membership in the American Cinema Editors.

Documentarian Gary Weimberg credited Dalva with inventing the "timeline" method of editing that is now ubiquitous with non-linear video editing.

=== Cinematography ===
Dalva's USC classmate George Lucas hired him to shoot second unit photography on the original Star Wars. He also did additional photography on The Black Stallion.

He subsequently shot several documentaries. In 1999, he shot 24 episodes of the police procedural television series Nash Bridges.

=== Directing ===
Dalva directed a behind-the-scenes documentary of Francis Ford Coppola's The Conversation.

He made his feature directorial debut with The Black Stallion Returns, the sequel to The Black Stallion. Later, he directed episodes of Crime Story, Nova, and Star Wars: The Clone Wars.

== Personal life ==
Dalva married Marcia Smith in 1964, they had four children.

=== Death ===
Dalva died from lymphoma in Larkspur, California, on January 27, 2023, at the age of 80.

== Filmography ==
=== Film ===
Year	Title	Contributed to			Notes
Year	Title	Director	Editor	DoP.	Notes
1969	Lions Love	No	Yes	No	
1977	Star Wars	No	No	2nd unit	
1979	The Black Stallion	No	Yes	Addtl.	
1983	The Black Stallion Returns	Yes	No	No	
1985	Latino	No	Yes	No	
1986	On the Edge	No	Yes	No	Consulting editor
1987	Heat and Sunlight	No	No	Addtl.	
1989	The War of the Roses	No	No	2nd unit	
1992	Raising Cain	No	Yes	No	
1993	The Joy Luck Club	No	Addtl.	No	
1995	Jumanji	No	Yes	No	
1997	Conceiving Ada	No	Yes	No	
1999	October Sky	No	Yes	No	
2001	Jurassic Park III	No	Yes	No	
2004	Hidalgo	No	Yes	No	
2005	The Prize Winner of Defiance, Ohio	No	Yes	No	
2008	Touching Home	No	Yes	No	
2010	The River Why	No	Yes	No	Consulting editor
2011	Captain America: The First Avenger	No	Yes	No	
2011	Immortals	No	Addtl.	No	
2012	Knife Fight	No	Yes	No	
2013	Lovelace	No	Yes	No	
2013	Sweetwater	No	Yes	No	
2015	Heist	No	Yes	No	
2016	Precious Cargo	No	Yes	No	
2019	The Hall	No	Yes	No	Short film
2021	San Francisco Stories	No	Yes	No	

=== Television ===
Year	Title	Contributed to			Notes
Year	Title	Director	Editor	DoP.	Notes
1978	Forever	No	Yes	No	TV movie
1987	Crime Story	Yes	No	No	Episode: "Always a Blonde"
1999-2000	Nash Bridges	No	No	Yes	24 episodes
2010	Star Wars: The Clone Wars	Yes	No	No	Episode: "The Deserter"

=== Documentary works ===
Year	Title	Contributed to			Notes
Year	Title	Director	Editor	DoP.	Notes
1974	Close-Up on 'The Conversation'	Yes	Yes	Yes	
1975	Fighting for Our Lives	No	Yes	No	Consulting editor
1977	Word Is Out: Stories of Some of Our Lives	No	Yes	No	Consulting editor
1987	Nova: Ancient Treasures from the Deep	Yes	No	Yes	
1992	The Great Eclipse	No	No	Yes	
1995	Carrier: Fortress at Sea	No	No	Yes	
1997	Frontline: A Whale of a Business	No	Yes	No	
1997	Cadillac Desert	No	Yes	No	
1997	Real Sex	No	Yes	No	
2001	Send Word, Bear Mother	No	No	Yes	
2014	American Masters: A Fierce Green Fire	No	Yes	No	
2017	Evolution of Organic	No	Yes	No	

== Awards and nominations ==
Award	Year	Category	Work	Result
Academy Award	1980	Best Film Editing	The Black Stallion	Nominated
American Cinema Editors Award	1980	Best Edited Feature Film – Dramatic	The Black Stallion	Nominated
