= Warning Sign (film) =

- Theatrical release poster
- Directed by: Hal Barwood
- Written by: Hal Barwood; Matthew Robbins
- Produced by: Hal Barwood; Jim Bloom
- Starring: Sam Waterston; Kathleen Quinlan; Yaphet Kotto; Jeffrey DeMunn; Richard Dysart
- Cinematography: Dean Cundey
- Edited by: Robert Lawrence
- Music by: Craig Safan
- Distributed by: 20th Century Fox
- Release date: August 23, 1985
- Running time: 99 minutes
- Country: United States
- Language: English
- Budget: $7.7 million
- Box office: $1,918,117

Warning Sign is a 1985 American science fiction-horror film directed by Hal Barwood and starring Sam Waterston, Kathleen Quinlan, Yaphet Kotto, Jeffrey DeMunn, and Richard Dysart.

== Plot ==
In a secret military laboratory operating under the guise of a pesticide manufacturer, a sealed tube is broken, starting an outbreak of a virulent bacteria. Detecting the release of the biological weapon, Joanie Morse, the plant's security officer, activates "Protocol One," a procedure sealing all of the workers inside from the outside world. Tom Schmidt, believing the cause for the lock down to be a pump malfunction, and co-worker Bob restart the pump.

Cal Morse, a County Sheriff and Joanie's husband, is advised to retain the help of Dr. Dan Fairchild, a past employee who is a known alcoholic. Fairchild created an antidote to the weapon. Vic Flint, Bob's father, joins the mission.

The United States government's Accident Containment Team (USACT), led by Major Connelly, arrives and sets up quarantine procedures. Connelly tells the public a cover story of the contamination of experimental yeast while a rescue team arrives to administer the antidote to the workers.

Upon the release of the weapon, workers sanitize the lab, destroy animals, and inoculate themselves with the antidote. Hours later, the USACT team locate Dr. Nielsen and his team incapacitated on the floor near an air lock. They later notice that the bodies have disappeared, the air lock smashed open from inside, and a power outage caused by Dr. Ramesh Kapoor, a P4 worker, by destroying a power box.

A group of workers—including Bob, Schmidt, and Tippett—believe themselves to be unaffected and want to leave, despite the quarantine. Unbeknownst to the workers, they became infected by the breach of the air lock, the bypassed pump circulating contaminated air throughout the building, and Schmidt's contact lens contaminating the building with the weapon. Joanie destroyed the piece of paper containing the code to deactivate the lockdown, but remembers the code. The group, now led by Tippett, torture her for the code, which is discovered to be invalidated once USACT tapped into the system.

The rescue team eventually encounters this group of workers. The team order the group to remain under quarantine; Tippett is killed when he refuses. The rest are placed in a room to await inoculation when the team returns with the antidote.

Fairchild directs the team into an unoccupied service conduit as a direct way to the P4 lab. The team encounters Nielsen. Suspecting something to be wrong, Fairchild directs the team to retreat, leaving Nielsen behind. The team are ambushed and murdered by the P4 workers, one of which is murdered by Kapoor. Despite being inoculated, the antidote did not work; suffering from the effects of the weapon, all of the infected workers become homicidal maniacs.

Upon the rescue team's death, USACT activates "Protocol Two", leaving all employees to await the deadly effects of the weapon and sanitize the location afterwards. Hearing this, Cal urges Fairchild to assist him in retrieving the antidote, stopping the contagion, and saving Joanie. At the facility, Cal and Fairchild encounter an infected Bob. He tries to attack, but is killed by Cal, armed with the revolver.

Most of the workers succumb to their infections, but Joanie is unaffected. Schmidt convinces her to go to the P4 lab to retrieve the antidote. En route, they encounter Nielsen, who wants to contain the knowledge of the incident, and Kapoor, who wants to kill them. They eventually escape the attack.

While in the P4 lab, Schmidt succumbs to his infection while the P4 workers hunt them down. Joanie retrieves the antidote and flees while Schmidt attacks the workers, breaking Kapoor's neck before being killed by the rest.

Joanie eventually encounters Cal and Fairchild. They later repel a group of workers who rip Fairchild's biohazard suit, exposing him. They enter the P4 lab to learn why Joanie is unaffected while the antidote did not work. A test discovers that her blood is full of estrogen, progesterone, and antibodies; she is pregnant. While attempting to enter P4 to attack the trio, workers are set on fire by booby traps. One worker rips Cal's biohazard suit before being killed by Joanie.

Before being incapacitated by his infection, Fairchild enters a recipe for a new antidote based on Joanie's condition into a computer; it contains thorazine to make the patient sleep during their recuperation. They try out the new antidote on Fairchild, and it works.

Armed with injection guns, Cal and Fairchild inoculate infected workers while Joanie takes a batch of the new antidote to the building's decontamination system. Nielsen, refusing to be injected, flees back to the lab. Eventually realizing his failure, he commits suicide.

Using the decontamination system, Joanie administers the new antidote throughout the building, eradicating the weapon and treating workers breathing in the aerosolized antidote. Joanie then deactivates the quarantine and Fairchild inoculates Cal. USACT then evacuates the victims, retrieves the dead and seals the building.

== Cast ==
- Sam Waterston as Cal Morse
- Kathleen Quinlan as Joanie Morse
- Yaphet Kotto as Major Connolly
- Jeffrey DeMunn as Dr. Dan Fairchild
- Richard Dysart as Dr. Nielsen
- G. W. Bailey as Tom Schmidt
- Jerry Hardin as Vic Flint
- Rick Rossovich as Bob
- Cynthia Carle as Dana
- Scott Paulin as Captain Walston, leader of the rescue team
- Kavi Raz as Dr. Ramesh Kapoor
- Keith Szarabajka as Tippett
- Jack Thibeau as Pisarczyk
- J. Patrick McNamara as Connolly's Aide
- Tom McFadden as Deputy Grazio
- Kyle Heffner as Video Technician #1
- Meshach Taylor as Video Technician #2
- Lori Hallier as TV Reporter
- Jeannie Epper as Woman on Video Screen
- Gilbert Smith as Man on Schmidt's Team
- Nancie Kawata as Woman in Cafeteria

== Production ==
=== Development ===
Producer Jim Bloom and writers Matthew Robbins and Hal Barwood initially set to work on time travel project called The Grid, which would've followed four friends who come back through time, but an error leads to the four being sent to different points in time (One lands in 1954, one in 1962, one in 1972, and one in 1978) and covering the 20 years it takes them to reunite. The $17 million project was developed at The Ladd Company, but The Ladd Company wanted to reduce the project to $14 million which Bloom and Barwood didn't think could effectively support the needs of the script. Following the collapse of The Grid, Robbins and Barwood instead wrote the smaller scale script for Warning Sign centered around germ warfare, described by Bloom as a mixture of The China Syndrome and Night of the Living Dead, with the intent of Barwood making the film his directorial debut. After the failure of The Right Stuff, The Ladd Company ceased all production activities. Joe Wizan of 20th Century Fox acquired the Warning Sign script and set the film up. During production various titles were considered such as Vest and Blue Harvest (which were references to producer Bloom's work with George Lucas on The Empire Strikes Back and Return of the Jedi). The film was initially intended to be released under the title of Biohazard, but this had to be changed due to the release of Fred Olen Ray's recent film of the same name resulting in the film's final title being Warning Sign.

=== Filming ===
Parts of the film were shot in Payson, Utah. Filming for the main BioTek facility was conducted at a vacant Junior High School in La Crescenta-Montrose, California with the set for the main BioTek containment lab built in the school's gymnasium.

== Release ==
Warning Sign was released to theaters on August 23, 1985, however, according to producer Jim Bloom 20th Century Fox experienced a change in management during production and despite the film testing reasonably well with audiences Fox gave the film a muted release with little promotion. The film's final gross was $1,918,117 against a $7.7 million production budget.

== Reception ==
Warning Sign has an approval rating of 20% on Rotten Tomatoes, based on 10 reviews. Audiences polled by CinemaScore gave the film an average grade of "C+" on an A+ to F scale.

Rick Kogan of the Chicago Tribune wrote: "Warning Sign fails to deliver any substantive messages or any genuine thrills."

The original title was Biohazard, which tested poorly with preview audiences, and the film was retitled but used the biohazard sign on the poster.
