= William Brashler =

American novelist

William Brashler (born 1947) is an American author and journalist. He is best known for writing The Bingo Long Traveling All-Stars and Motor Kings, which was published in 1973. A film adaptation, directed by John Badham and starring Richard Pryor and Billy Dee Williams, was released in 1976. Bingo Long was chosen as one of the top 100 sports books of all time by Sports Illustrated, in 2002. The 20th anniversary edition of the book included a preface by sports historian Peter C. Bjarkman.

== Career ==
City Dogs, Brashler's next novel, was inspired by his time covering the Chicago police beat, and was favorably reviewed by Kirkus Reviews and The New York Times. The New Yorker gave it a mixed review, however, calling it "erratically interesting," with only some of Bingo Long's "attractiveness and humor."

Brashler grew up in Grand Rapids, Michigan, attended Calvin College and graduated from the University of Michigan in 1969. A collection of his papers is held at Calvin's Heritage Hall, Hekman Library. Brashler is an alumnus of the Iowa Writers’ Workshop.

He worked as a journalist for Lerner Newspapers.

Brashler coauthored Johnny Bench's 1979 autobiography.

== Books ==
- The Bingo Long Traveling All-Stars and Motor Kings (1973)
- City Dogs (1976)
- The Don: The Life and Death of Sam Giancana (1977)
- Josh Gibson: A Life in the Negro Leagues (1978)
- The Chosen Prey (1982)
- Traders (1989)
- The Story of Negro League Baseball (1994)
