= The Bingo Long Traveling All-Stars & Motor Kings =

1976 film by John Badham

- Theatrical release poster
- Directed by: John Badham
- Screenplay by: Hal Barwood; Matthew Robbins
- Based on: The Bingo Long Traveling All-Stars and Motor Kings (1973 novel) by William Brashler
- Produced by: Berry Gordy; Rob Cohen
- Starring: Billy Dee Williams; James Earl Jones; Richard Pryor; Stan Shaw; Tony Burton
- Cinematography: Bill Butler
- Edited by: David Rawlins
- Music by: William Goldstein
- Production company: Motown Productions
- Distributed by: Universal Pictures
- Release date: July 16, 1976
- Running time: 110 minutes
- Country: United States
- Language: English
- Budget: $9 million
- Box office: $33 million

The Bingo Long Traveling All-Stars & Motor Kings is a 1976 American sports comedy film about a team of enterprising ex-Negro league baseball players in the era of racial segregation. Loosely based upon William Brashler's 1973 novel of the same name, it starred Billy Dee Williams, James Earl Jones and Richard Pryor. Directed by John Badham (in his directorial debut), the movie was produced by Berry Gordy for Motown Productions and Rob Cohen for Universal Pictures, and released by Universal on July 16, 1976.

The film was a box office success, grossing $33 million on a $9 million budget.

== Plot ==
Tired of being treated like a slave by team owner Sallison Potter, charismatic star pitcher Bingo Long steals a bunch of Negro league players away from their teams, including catcher and slugger Leon Carter, and Charlie Snow, a player forever scheming to break into the segregated Major League Baseball of the 1930s by masquerading as first a Cuban ("Carlos Nevada"), then a Native American ("Chief Takahoma"). They take to the road, barnstorming through small Midwestern towns, playing the local teams to make ends meet. One of the opposing players, "Esquire" Joe Calloway, is so good that they recruit him.

Bingo's team becomes so outlandishly entertaining and successful, it begins to cut into the attendance of the established Negro league teams. Finally, Bingo's nemesis Potter is forced to propose a winner-take-all game: if Bingo's team can beat a bunch of all-stars, it can join the league, but if it loses, the players will return to their old teams. Potter has two of his goons kidnap Leon prior to the game as insurance, but he escapes and is key to his side's victory.

As it turns out, there is a Major League scout in the audience. After the game, he offers Esquire Joe the chance to break the color barrier; with Bingo's blessing, he accepts. Leon glumly foresees the decline of the Negro leagues as more players follow Esquire Joe's lead, but Bingo, ever the optimist, cheers him up by describing the wild promotional stunts he intends to stage to bring in the paying customers.

== Cast ==
- Billy Dee Williams as Bingo Long
- James Earl Jones as Leon Carter
- Richard Pryor as Charlie Snow / "Carlos Nevada" / "Chief Takahoma"
- Stan Shaw as Joseph Vanderbilt "Esquire Joe" Calloway
- Tony Burton as Issac, an All-Star
- Rico Dawson as Willie Lee Shively, an All-Star
- Sam "Birmingham" Brison as Louis Keystone, an All-Star
- Jophery Brown as Emory "Champ" Chambers, an All-Star
- Leon Wagner as Sam "Fat Sam" Popper, an All-Star
- John McCurry as Walter Murchman, an All-Star
- DeWayne Jessie as "Rainbow", the All-Stars' batboy
- Ted Ross as Sallison Potter, owner of the Ebony Aces
- Mabel King as Bertha Dewitt, another team owner
- Ken Foree as "Honey", one of Potter's henchmen
- Carl Gordon as Mack, another one of Potter's henchmen
- Ahna Capri as a prostitute

== Negro leagues tie-ins ==
Some characters and situations are loosely based upon real-life people and incidents. Badham grew up in Birmingham, Alabama, and was familiar with the Birmingham Black Barons, who shared Rickwood Field with the white Birmingham Barons.

Bingo Long is based on former Black Baron Leroy "Satchel" Paige. Early in his career, Paige would call in his outfield while leading in the ninth inning against an amateur or semi-pro team and strike out the side. Bingo did a similar stunt in this movie. Leon Carter is a Josh Gibson-like power hitter, even playing the same position (catcher). "Esquire" Joe Calloway is an amalgam of another Black Baron, Willie Mays (in personality, talent, and fielding position) and Jackie Robinson (as being signed by a white team at the film's end).

The Bingo Long Traveling All-Stars & Motor Kings were loosely based on the Indianapolis Clowns and other barnstorming Negro baseball teams, who likewise engaged in barnstorming.

== Production ==
Luther Williams Field in Macon, Georgia, was used for filming as the Negro league ballpark. Luther Williams Field was home to the Macon Music, a minor league team in the independent South Coast League. Additional ballpark scenes were shot at Morgan Field in Macon, a Pony and Colt League Youth Baseball field, Grayson Stadium in Savannah, Georgia, home of the Savannah Bananas, and Wallace Field in Crawford County, Georgia. Exterior scenes set in St. Louis residential neighborhoods were also filmed in Savannah. Scenes set in rural communities were filmed in Talbotton, Georgia, and various small towns around Macon, including Monticello, Georgia. Some ballplayers were played by actual former athletes, including former members of the Indianapolis Clowns, who performed various stunts shown in the film.

Steven Spielberg originally wanted to have a hand in producing the movie until the success of his film Jaws got his full attention.

== Reception ==
The film received positive reviews. Roger Ebert wrote that "Bingo Long is fun, it's pleasant to watch, but it cakewalks too much on its way to the box office." Jay Cocks agreed in his Time review, stating: "Although it never fulfills the richest possibilities in the raffish misadventures of a barnstorming black baseball team of the 1930s, it does come close from time to time." Stanley Kauffmann of The New Republic described The Bingo Long Traveling All-Stars & Motor Kings as a "flyweight picture which is considerable fun."

The movie holds an 87% "Fresh" rating on Rotten Tomatoes based on 63 critics, with the consensus: "Assembling an all-star team and letting them have infectious fun, Bingo Long throws a grand party in the dugout while giving a generation of ballplayers their overdue shine."

== Accolades ==
The film was nominated for the American Film Institute's 2008 AFI's 10 Top 10 in the sports film category.

== See also ==
- List of baseball films
