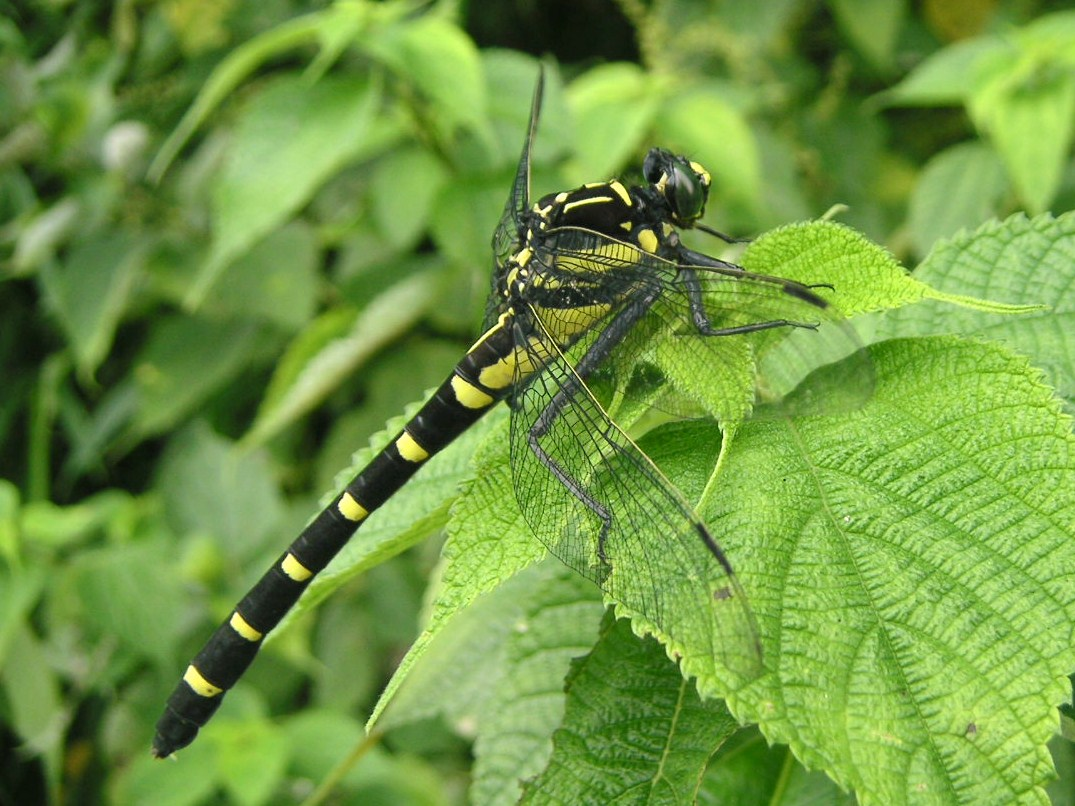
- Sieboldius albardae
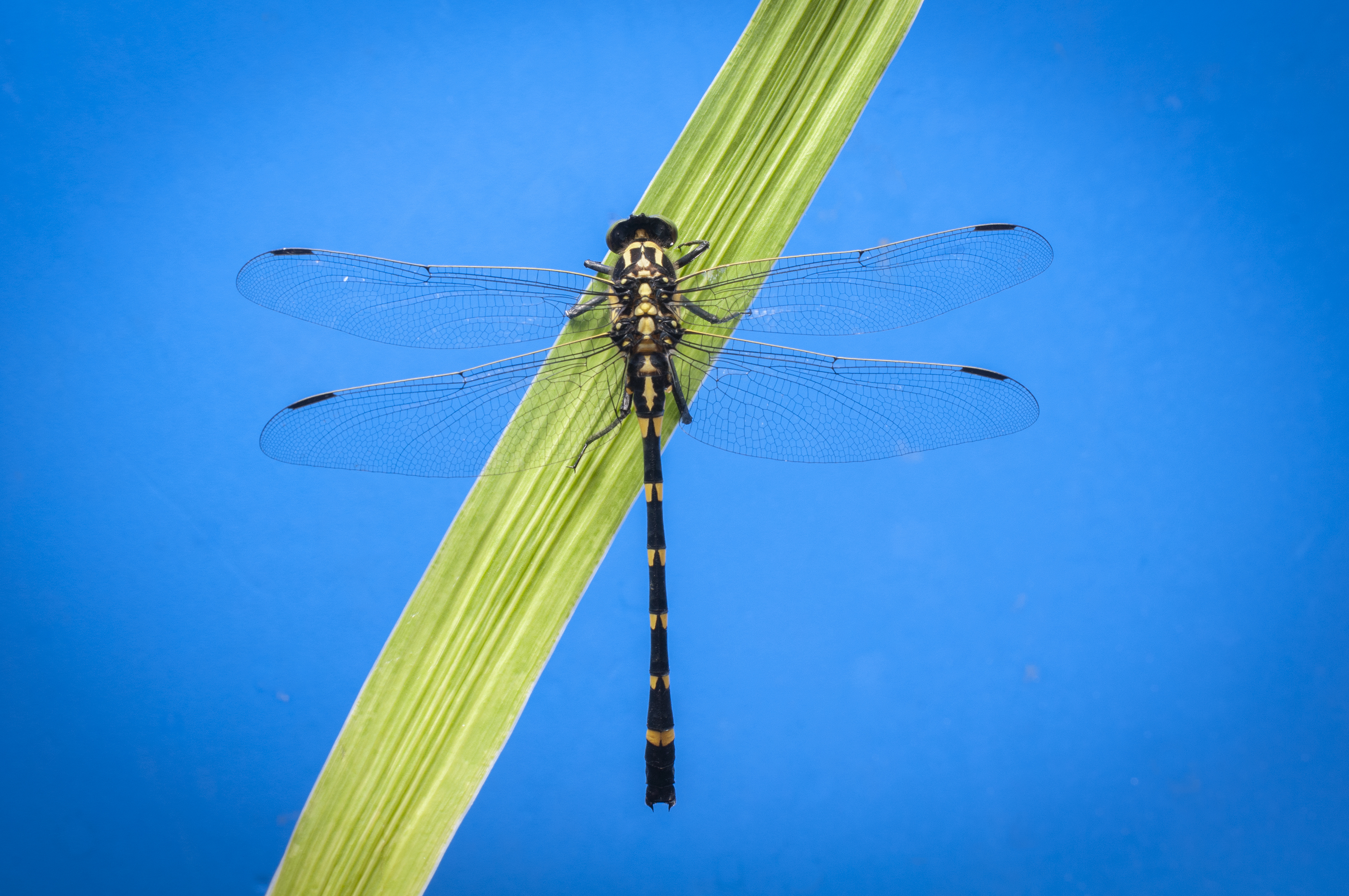
- Sieboldius albardae, Adult, South Korea

Scientific classification
- Kingdom: Animalia
- Phylum: Arthropoda
- Clade: Pancrustacea
- Class: Insecta
- Order: Odonata
- Infraorder: Anisoptera
- Family: Gomphidae
- Genus: Sieboldius; Selys, 1854

= Sieboldius =

Genus of dragonflies

Sieboldius is a genus of dragonflies in the family Gomphidae. The genus occurs in Asia and is closely related to the dragonhunter (Hagenius brevistylus) of North America.

The genus contains the following species:

- Sieboldius albardae Selys, 1886
- Sieboldius alexanderi (Chao, 1955) - small dragonhunter
- Sieboldius deflexus (Chao, 1955)
- Sieboldius gigas (Martin, 1904)
- Sieboldius herculeus Needham, 1930
- Sieboldius japponicus Selys, 1854
- Sieboldius maai Chao, 1990
- Sieboldius nigricolor (Fraser, 1924)
