= Matthew Robbins (screenwriter) =

American screenwriter and film director

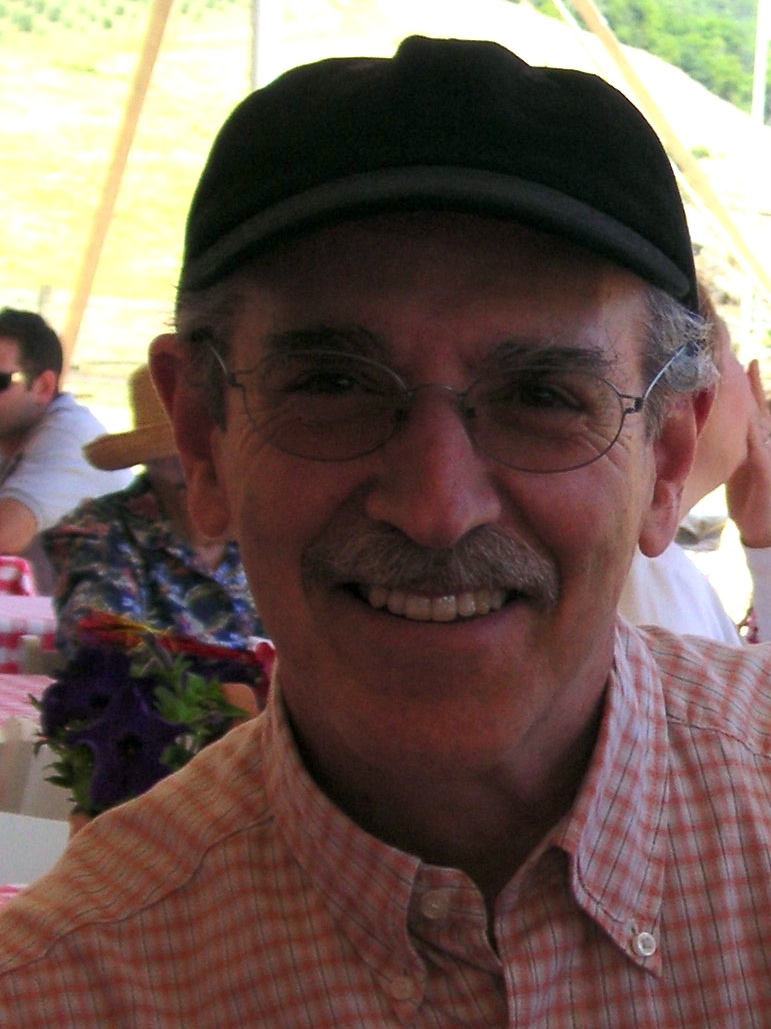
- Robbins in 2005
- Occupations: Screenwriter; Film director
- Years active: 1971–present
- Known for: The Sugarland Express; Dragonslayer; Batteries Not Included; Mimic
- Spouse: Janet Robbins
- Awards: Best Screenplay Award (Cannes Film Festival); 1974 The Sugarland Express

Matthew Robbins is an American filmmaker best known for his writing work within the American New Wave movement.

He collaborated with numerous filmmakers within the movement including George Lucas, Walter Murch and Steven Spielberg, on films like The Sugarland Express, Close Encounters of the Third Kind, and Jaws. He has also worked frequently with Guillermo del Toro, writing his films Mimic, Crimson Peak and Pinocchio. Robbins has frequently worked with writer Hal Barwood.

Prior to attending USC School of Cinematic Arts, Robbins graduated from Johns Hopkins University in 1965 where he was classmate and friends with Walter Murch and Caleb Deschanel. He is a graduate of the AFI Conservatory. In 2004, Robbins received a Distinguished Alumnus Award from Johns Hopkins.

In 2011, he made his debut in Indian cinema by writing the screenplay for the Bollywood thriller 7 Khoon Maaf, along with director Vishal Bhardwaj. His second Indian film, Rangoon, was also directed by Bhardwaj.

== Filmography ==
Year	Title	Director	Writer	Notes
1974	The Sugarland Express	No	Yes	
1976	The Bingo Long Traveling All-Stars & Motor Kings	No	Yes	
1977	MacArthur	No	Yes	
1978	Corvette Summer	Yes	Yes	
1981	Dragonslayer	Yes	Yes	
1985	Warning Sign	No	Yes	Also executive producer
1985	The Legend of Billie Jean	Yes	No	
1985	Amazing Stories	Yes	No	Episode: "The Main Attraction"
1987	Batteries Not Included	Yes	Yes	
1989	Mothers, Daughters and Lovers	Yes	No	TV movie
1991	Bingo	Yes	No	
1993	"Off the Ground"	Yes	No	Music video by Paul McCartney
1997	Mimic	No	Yes	
2007	Blood Brothers	No	Story	Short film
2009	Le Concert	No	Collaboration	
2010	Don't Be Afraid of the Dark	No	Yes	
2011	7 Khoon Maaf	No	Yes	
2013	Vijay and I	No	Yes	
2013	Ek Thi Daayan	No	Collaboration	
2015	Crimson Peak	No	Yes	
2015	Chatô: O Rei do Brasil	No	Yes	
2017	Rangoon	No	Yes	
2017	Madame	No	Yes	
2022	Pinocchio	No	Story	
2026	Ray Gunn	No	Yes	

=== Uncredited writer ===
- Electronic Labyrinth: THX 1138 4EB (1967, short film)
- THX 1138 (1971, also cameo as "THX 1138 in end scene")
- Jaws (1975)
- Close Encounters of the Third Kind (1977, also second unit director and cameo as "Returnee #3 Flt. 19")
- E.T. The Extra-Terrestrial (1982)
- Haunted Mansion (2023)

== Awards and nominations ==
- 1974 Cannes Film Festival Award for Best Screenplay: The Sugarland Express (won)
- 1974 Writers Guild of America Award for Best Comedy Written Directly for the Screen: The Sugarland Express (nomination)
- 1976 Writers Guild of America Award for Best Comedy Adapted from Another Medium: The Bingo Long Traveling All-Stars & Motor Kings (nomination)
- 1981 Hugo Award for Best Dramatic Presentation: Dragonslayer (nomination)
- 1997 Saturn Award for Best Writing: Mimic (nomination)
- 2010 César Award for Best Original Screenplay: Le Concert (nomination)
- 2015 Saturn Award for Best Writing: Crimson Peak (nomination)
