= Lions Love =

- Directed by: Agnès Varda
- Written by: Agnès Varda; Michael McClure
- Starring: Viva; Gerome Ragni; James Rado; Shirley Clarke
- Edited by: Robert Dalva; Carolyn Hicks
- Release date: 20 September 1969 (NYFF)
- Running time: 110 minutes
- Country: United States
- Language: English

Lions Love is a 1969 American experimental art film directed and co-written by Agnès Varda.

== Synopsis ==
Viva, Jerry and Jim, a throuple of young actors experiencing a carefree "hippie" lifestyle, are welcoming the NYC underground filmmaker Shirley Clarke at their Beverly Hills house.

== Cast ==
- Viva - Viva
- Gerome Ragni - Jerry
- James Rado - Jim
- Shirley Clarke - Herself
- Carlos Clarens - Himself
- Eddie Constantine - Eddie

=== Trivia ===
Both Ragni and Rado, the two male leads, were the lyricists and lead actors and singers for the 1968 musical Hair.
