= Dragon Hunter =

Manhwa series by Hong Seock-seo

- Cover of the Tokyopop edition of Dragon Hunter vol. 1 (2003)

용잡이 RR: Yongjabi MR: Yongjabi
- Genre: Action-adventure, Historical fantasy, Drama
- Author: Hong Seock-seo
- Publisher: (South Korea) Seoul Munhwasa
- English publisher: (United States) Tokyopop
- Other publishers: (France) Tokebi
- Volumes: 31

Dragon Hunter (Korean: 용잡이) is a long-running historical fantasy manhwa series created by Hong Seock-seo, set in a 6th-century South Korea terrorized by dragons. The series began publication on June 10, 2003.

== Plot ==
The story involves a money-obsessed dragon hunter named Seur Chong, who, with the aid of shamans, tries to follow in the footsteps of Andrew Yi, the greatest dragon hunter of all time. Seur Chong, however, is afflicted with the Dragon's Curse, and he must slay a blue dragon in order to survive.

== Characters ==
Seur-Chong
The protagonist of the series. He is known as Mi-Ru-Me, "The Bes for Dragon and "Me" meaning mountain peak. Together they mean "best" or "Greatest") He wields a large six-section sword made from dragon scales. It is called "Mi-Ru-Do." He loves money more than anything and is willing to take on any job for the right price. he spends much of his free time gambling. Although he is money greedy, he is a kind person, saving Myung-Ho for example. His original design resembles a samurai, but he looked more honest, so the design was thrown away.

Dragon's Curse:this curse gives him great strength and stamina but at a great cost. His body is slowly being turned into stone. A curse from the Blue Dragon.

Myung-Ho
Seur-Chong's shaman who controls dragons with spells. He is unique as male shaman are rare, but he is one of the best, knowing even the most powerful spells.(The sacrifice spell, the heaven spell.) He is also highly skilled with Kunai, even being able to take down one of the Four Guardians by hitting vitals. In personality he is the good to counterbalance Seur-Chong's penny-pinching habits. He cares deeply for his sister Aranseur. Originally, he was supposed to die, but because of his popularity, he survived.

Dragon's Curse: A third eye in his forehead that he can open at will. It allows him to see into the future and also greatly enhances his shamanic powers. A curse from the water dragon in the second hunt.

Tae-Rang/Kok-Jung
A Chinese Dragon Hunter. He was once Seur-Chong's partner, but he was too arrogant and tried to kill Myung-Ho. He now has a cross shaped scar on his face from Seur-Chong. He calls himself Tae-Rang because he is embarrassed by his real name.(Kok-Jung means "careful")

Dragon's Curse: The power to generate fire.(although he has only used it once and has not been mentioned since) A curse from the land dragon they fought when he tried to kill Myung-Ho.

Mong-Yeun
A female shaman who always has a poker face and does not make any sense when talking. When joining Seur-chong's group, she and Seur-Chong are always fighting (whenever she makes a feast, Seur-Chong would attempt to kill her). Originally a shaman in So-Chun's temple, but got kicked out. Attracted to Seur-Chong.

Aranseur
Myung-ho's little sister. she too was at the shaman temple when seur-chong and kok-jung arrived but she was only a little girl. she was held captive by kok-jung to lure myung-ho so he could kill him.

Daechang-Nim\Seur Chun

A former leader of the Invisible Shadow Killer Clan of the Chunjoo. It was made apparent that he was blind in the hunt of the water dragon when he proclaimed that his equilibrium was off, and the fact that his eyes were surrounded by the dragons curse of the thunder dragon. he is extremely powerful yet very mysterious. It is not until volume seven where you begin to suspect that he is intermingled with Seur Chong and in volume 8 it is told that Yeun-Wha which was Seur Chong's mother was in fact his wife and thus making him the father of Seur Chong. Dragons Curse: Thunder Dragon

Ru-Ahn
She is Daechang-Nim's apprentice. Her father was killed by Daechang-Nim, and she uses the same weapons as he did. She uses Tiger claws attached to her hands. At one point, she did have the opportunity to kill the Daechang, but couldn't bring herself to do it.
