= Dragonhunt =

Board game

Dragonhunt is a fantasy board game published by Avalon Hill in 1982.

== Description ==
Dragonhunt is a board game for two to six players designed by Willis Carpenter, Garrett Donner, and Michael Steer, with artwork by Chris White.

The game is set in Arawan, a land periodically devastated by the dragon Brimstone. The players take on the roles of the rival Kings of Arawan, vying for control of the lands, in order to build an army of soldiers who will fight the dragon. Mystical beings wander across the map, helping or hindering forces. Once one player's forces have wounded the dragon three times, the magical Magesword will be given to that player, who can use it to finally slay the dragon and win the game.

The game components are:

- 24 Dragon Cards
- 36 Movement Cards (6 per Player)
- 6 Hero Counters (1 per Player)
- 6 Magesword Counters (1 per Player)
- 24 Sniper Counters (4 per player)
- 72 Knight Counters (12 per Player)
- 144 Men at Arms Counters (24 per Player)
- 10 Mystical Being Counters
- 2 Mystical Being Control Markers
- 4 Flame Markers
- 18 Dragon Wound Markers
- 12 Magic Defense Markers
- 2 Dragon Counters
- 6 Dragon Parts Counters
- 1 Game Board
- 2 Six-sided Dice

== Reception ==
Robert Hulston reviewed Dragonhunt for Imagine magazine, and stated that "unfortunately, given many of the inconsistencies, play mechanisms and concepts, there is too much fantasy in the worst sense of the word."

In the October 1983 edition of White Dwarf (Issue #46), Charles Vasey had an indifferent reaction to the game, calling it "Tolkien without the grandeur, Moorcock without the originality." He concluded, "Dragonhunt is not [...] one of my favourite games. Neither is it quite so cretinous as I may have implied, it can be fun but does not really impress."

In the January 2001 edition of The Boardgamer (Vol. 6, Issue 1), despite the fact that it was designed for 2–6 players, Dragonhunt was listed as having a high degree of adaptibility to solitaire play.
