= Corvette Summer =

1978 adventure comedy film by Matthew Robbins

- Theatrical release poster
- Directed by: Matthew Robbins
- Written by: Hal Barwood; Matthew Robbins
- Produced by: Hal Barwood
- Starring: Mark Hamill; Annie Potts
- Cinematography: Frank Stanley
- Edited by: Amy Holden Jones
- Music by: Craig Safan
- Production companies: Metro-Goldwyn-Mayer; Plotto Productions
- Distributed by: United Artists
- Release date: June 2, 1978
- Running time: 104 minutes
- Country: United States
- Language: English
- Budget: $1.7 million
- Box office: $36 million

Corvette Summer is a 1978 American adventure comedy film directed by Matthew Robbins. It was Mark Hamill's first screen appearance after the unexpected success of Star Wars the previous year. Hamill stars as a California teenager who heads to Las Vegas to track down his beloved customized Corvette Stingray. Co-star Annie Potts, playing the quirky young woman he meets along the way, was nominated for a Golden Globe Award in her first film role.

Corvette Summer was a box office success, making about $36 million at the worldwide box office, on a relatively small budget of $1.7 million. The film however, received a divided response from critics.

== Plot ==
Kenny Dantley (Hamill) is a car-loving high school senior from Newhall, California. For a project in his shop class, Kenny rescues a 1973 Chevrolet Corvette Stingray from inside an operating car crusher in a scrapyard and helps rebuild it as a customized right-hand-drive with flashy vents, pipes, and bodywork. Shortly after the new set of wheels is unveiled, the car is stolen from the streets of Van Nuys. After hearing that the car is in Las Vegas, Kenny immediately sets out to get it back. On the way, he meets the seemingly confident drifter Vanessa (Potts), who is a self-described "prostitute trainee". She drives a customized white Chevy van with waterbed, red interior, and curtains.

Kenny finds work in a Vegas car wash and spots his car on more than one occasion; the police eventually get involved but cannot help locate the vehicle once it is discovered that it bears a forged tag. Kenny tracks it down to a local garage, where he has an incident with the garage owner, Wayne Lowry (Milford), before being bailed out by Vanessa.

Kenny's high school teacher, Ed McGrath (Roche), comes to Las Vegas and Kenny learns that the teacher he once admired had arranged for the theft of the Corvette to help supplement his low earnings as a teacher. McGrath arranges for Kenny to go to work for Lowry, who was one of his former students. For his sake and that of his family, McGrath begs Kenny not to take the matter to the police. McGrath also ominously notes that if Kenny does not agree, one of Lowry's men will "handle it his way." Kenny agrees, but secretly plans to take the Corvette back.

Eventually, Kenny takes the car back, saves the mermaid-costumed Vanessa from adult-film makers in a hotel, wins a game of chicken ending a desert and freeway car chase, and returns home with Vanessa 'riding shotgun' in the Corvette. He keeps McGrath's secret, but rebuffs his attempts to repair their friendship. He gives the car back to the school, but walks away with Vanessa and his newly earned high school diploma.

== Cast ==
- Mark Hamill as Kenneth W. Dantley Jr.
- Annie Potts as Vanessa
- Eugene Roche as Ed McGrath
- William Bryant as Plainclothes Police Lecturer
- Richard McKenzie as Principal Bacon
- Kim Milford as Wayne Lowry
- Philip Bruns as Gil
- Danny Bonaduce as Kootz
- Jane A. Johnston as Mrs. Dantley
- Albert Insinnia as Ricci
- TK Carter as Car Wash Employee
- Stanley Kamel as Las Vegas con man
- Jason Ronard as Tony
- Brion James as Jeff
- John Miller as Principal
- Dick Miller as "Mr. Lucky"
- Isaac Ruiz as Tico
- Jonathan Terry as Van Nuys Policeman
- Wendie Jo Sperber as Kuchinsky

== Production ==
Working titles for the film were Dantley & Vanessa: A Fiberglass Romance, Stingray and The Hot One. Scenes of Kenny's high school were filmed at Burbank High School (Burbank, California) in the San Fernando Valley, and Verdugo Hills High School in Tujunga.

The novelization of Corvette Summer was written by Wayland Drew. The book was published by the New American Library of Canada in 1978.

The film's theme song, "Give Me the Night", was sung by Dusty Springfield.

=== The Corvette ===
There were two Corvettes made for the film (both 1973 model years): a “main” car and a "backup" model, both built for MGM by Korky's Kustom Studios. The main car was often displayed during the film's publicity tour, and both cars were later sold by MGM to private parties. The main car was sold to an Australian collector and altered to look different from how it appears in the film. An original mold of the car from the film was displayed at the Corvette Americana Hall of Fame in Cooperstown, New York, and is now part of the collection of the National Corvette Museum. The backup car remained in the U.S., was owned for a while by Mike Yager of Mid America Motorworks in Effingham, Illinois, and was on display there between periodic car shows. Yager sold the car to a private collector in late 2009. The car remains in the US with a private collector.

== Release ==
The film was originally released on June 2, 1978 in select markets including Atlanta, Charlotte and New Orleans and later expanded to 450 markets nationwide.

=== Critical response ===
Janet Maslin of The New York Times wrote that the central portion of the film "has a visual zaniness that meshes effectively with the script. But for the most part, the movie takes a slender, boyish conceit — of the sort that is suddenly so popular among Hollywood's current batch of boy wonders — and invests it with silliness rather than whimsy." Gene Siskel gave the film two stars out of four and wrote that it "would like to develop the same wistful quality as 'American Graffiti.' It doesn't." Arthur D. Murphy of Variety called the film "a most delightful comedy," adding, "Robbins' direction is assured and the performances are all super." Linda Gross of the Los Angeles Times called the film "a well-made love story about a boy, a girl and a souped-up sports car with outstanding performances by Mark Hamill and Annie Potts as two innocents afoot in a terrible world." Gary Arnold of The Washington Post wrote, "It comes as a keen disappointment when the movie's initially promising plot begins coughing, sputtering and misfiring incessantly." David Ansen of Newsweek wrote, "This is Robins's first chance to show his stuff as a director, and from the evidence he has a good future behind the camera. His story may be predictable, his aim modest. But he demonstrates a fluid eye, and his flair for pacing and inventive use of locations make 'Corvette Summer' pleasant to watch whether or not you know a Stingray from a Monte Carlo." Critic Frank Rich of Time magazine thought the movie was an appropriate summer "popcorn flick." He wrote "As long as one doesn't demand too much of it, Corvette Summer delivers a very pleasant two hours of escape." TV Guide agreed, calling the film "all in all a very funny movie with enough solid, believable story to take it beyond the realm of teenage summer fare."

Overall, the review aggregator Rotten Tomatoes reported that 56% of critics gave the film a positive review, based on nine reviews.

=== Box office ===
Corvette Summer grossed $1,329,904 in its opening weekend going on to gross $15,514,367 in the United States and Canada, and about $36 million worldwide.

== Awards and nominations ==
In 1979, Annie Potts was nominated for a Golden Globe Award for "Best Motion Picture Acting Debut—Female" for her work in the film.

== Legacy ==
In Episode 513 (The Brain That Wouldn't Die) of Mystery Science Theater 3000, Mike Nelson exclaims, "Luke, join me or you'll star in Corvette Summer." This is an allusion to Mark Hamill's role in the Star Wars films. The Beck song "Corvette Bummer" is an allusion to the film.

In the 2017 Justice League Action short episode "Missing the Mark", Trickster (voiced by Hamill) mentions Corvette Summer as his favorite film to an animated Mark Hamill, describing the premise to sound like he is talking about Star Wars before mentioning it by title.

Green Day's 2024 album Saviors contains a song titled "Corvette Summer". Additionally, the band used an altered vintage poster of the film to announce and promote the premiere of the song's music video which features Hamill himself as well as Hannibal Buress.

== See also ==
- List of films set in Las Vegas
