= Dragonslayer (board game) =

Board game

Cover art by Redmond A. Simonsen, 1981

Dragonslayer is a board game published by Simulations Publications, Inc. (SPI) in 1981 that is based on the movie of the same name.

== Description ==
Dragonslayer is a game for 2–4 players in which the players are magicians competing to free the fictional land of Urland from its last dragon, Vermithrax Pejorative.

=== Game components ===
The game contains

- 17" x 22" map of Urland
- 100 die-cut counters
- 11" x 17" Battle Display
- sheet of rules
- quick reference sheet with examples

=== Setup ===
Each player selects a magician and an abode and places two King's men on the map. The Dragonshield and Ulrich are placed on the map, and tiles are placed facedown on the towns and hamlets.

=== Gameplay ===
Each magician takes their turn in a particular order: Aurric, Merridyds, Old Kyvin, Galen. Each magician wants to build up their strength and their magical items before taking on the Dragon. On their turn, each magician can spend up to 3 days moving by land or sea, or by taking tiles. Each magician also can, if desired, move their two King's men.

=== Victory conditions ===
When a magician feels they are strong enough to take on the Dragon, they move to the Dragon's Lair and engage the Dragon in combat. If the magician slays the Dragon, the game is over and that player is the winner. If the magician loses everyone in the party, that player is out of the game. Any other result is a draw; the Dragon is moved to a new location, and play continues.

== Publication history ==
Following the premiere of the 1981 fantasy movie Dragonslayer, SPI acquired the license to produce a board game. The result was Dragonslayer, designed by Brad Hessel and Redmond A. Simonsen, with artwork by Simonsen. It was released in 1981.

== Reception ==
David Ladyman reviewed Dragonslayer in The Space Gamer No. 46. Ladyman commented that "Dragonslayer is a simple, but imaginative game. As usual, I think the price is somewhat steep for what you get. If you've seen the movie more than twice, get the game - you'll enjoy it. It has flaws, but they can be avoided. If you like to tinker with and fine-tune the gaming systems you buy, you'll probably like Dragonslayer also."

== Other articles ==
- Ares #9
- Jeux & Stratégie #19
