= Dragonslayer (novel) =

Novel by Wayland Drew published in 1981

First edition (publ. Del Rey Books)

Dragonslayer is a novel by Wayland Drew published in 1981.

== Plot summary ==
Dragonslayer is a novelization of the film Dragonslayer.

== Reception ==
David St. Marie reviewed Dragonslayer in Ares Magazine #9 and commented that "I found Dragonslayer to be a solid novel, overall. It has failings, but most of those symptomatic of novels based on scripts have been avoided."

== Reviews ==
- Review by Jeff Frane (1981) in Locus, #244 May 1981
- Review by Chris Henderson (1981) in Dragon Magazine, #52, August 1981
- Review by Chris Henderson (1982) in Whispers #15-16, March 1982
