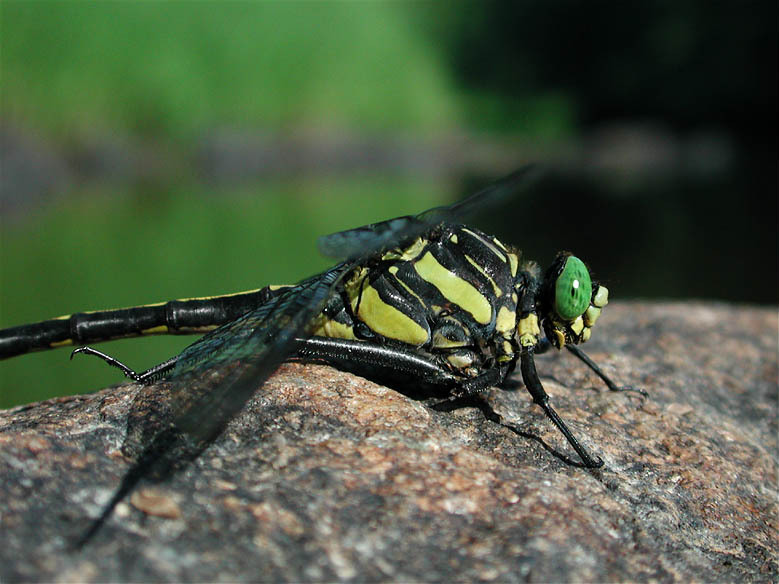
- Temagami, Ontario

Scientific classification
- Kingdom: Animalia
- Phylum: Arthropoda
- Clade: Pancrustacea
- Class: Insecta
- Order: Odonata
- Infraorder: Anisoptera
- Family: Gomphidae
- Subfamily: Hageniinae
- Genus: Hagenius; Selys, 1854
- Species: H. brevistylus

Binomial name
- Hagenius brevistylus Selys, 1854

= Dragonhunter =

Species of dragonfly

The dragonhunter (Hagenius brevistylus) is a clubtail dragonfly of the eastern United States and southeastern Canada.

The dragonfly is much larger than any other North American clubtail, at 3.3 inches (84 mm), with black and yellow markings and green eyes. Males can be distinguished at a distance by their habit of curling their abdomens under while flying, forming a sideways J shape.

The dragonhunter is the only member of genus Hagenius. Its closest relatives are Asian dragonflies of genus Sieboldius, which are also sometimes called "dragonhunters". Together, the two genera form the subfamily Hageniinae.

The nymph is unusual, with a very flat, wide body. It is slow-moving and lives among bark and leaf litter at the edges of streams, where its dark color provides camouflage.

The adult feeds on large insects, including darner and clubtail dragonflies, sometimes ambushing them from above. It also takes monarch butterflies, eating the thorax and abdomen first to avoid the greatest concentration of cardenolide toxins.

== Nomenclature ==
The genus name Hagenius was coined by Edmond de Sélys Longchamps in 1854 in honor of his collaborator and fellow entomologist Hermann August Hagen. The species name brevistylus comes from the combination of the Latin brevis, meaning "short," and stylus, referring to the botanical term style. Together, brevistylus means "short style" in reference to the stubby abdomens and short claspers which are characteristic of members of the clubtail family of dragonflies, or Gomphidae.
