= Dragonslayer (1981 film) =

1981 film by Matthew Robbins

- Theatrical release poster by Jeff Jones
- Directed by: Matthew Robbins
- Written by: Hal Barwood; Matthew Robbins
- Produced by: Hal Barwood; Howard W. Koch
- Starring: Peter MacNicol; Caitlin Clarke; Ralph Richardson; John Hallam; Peter Eyre; Sydney Bromley; Chloe Salaman; Ian McDiarmid
- Cinematography: Derek Vanlint
- Edited by: Tony Lawson
- Music by: Alex North
- Production companies: Paramount Pictures; Walt Disney Productions
- Distributed by: Paramount Pictures (United States and Canada); Buena Vista International (International)
- Release date: June 26, 1981
- Running time: 109 minutes
- Country: United States
- Language: English
- Budget: $18 million
- Box office: $14.1 million

Dragonslayer is a 1981 American dark fantasy film directed by Matthew Robbins from a screenplay he co-wrote with Hal Barwood. It stars Peter MacNicol in his feature film debut, Ralph Richardson, John Hallam, and Caitlin Clarke. It was a co-production between Paramount Pictures and Walt Disney Productions, where Paramount handled North American distribution and Disney handled international distribution through Buena Vista International. The story is set in a fictional medieval kingdom where a young sorcerer encounters challenges as he hunts a dragon, Vermithrax Pejorative.

It is the second joint production between Paramount and Disney, after Popeye (1980), and is more mature than most contemporary Disney films. Because the audience expected the film to be solely children's entertainment, the violence, adult themes and brief nudity were somewhat controversial, though Disney did not hold the North American distribution rights. The film was rated PG in the U.S. Like The Black Hole (1979), the version of the film broadcast on the Disney Channel was edited to remove two scenes. (Note: The scene where Galen discovers Valerian to be female (by swimming with her) and the scene where Galen causes an avalanche over the entrance to the dragon's cave.)

The special effects were created at Industrial Light and Magic, the first use of ILM outside of a Lucasfilm production. Phil Tippett had co-developed an animation technique there for The Empire Strikes Back (1980) called go motion, a variation on stop motion. This led to the film's nomination for the Academy Award for Best Visual Effects, but it lost to Raiders of the Lost Ark, the only other visual effects nominee that year, whose special effects were also provided by ILM. Including the hydraulic 40-foot (12 m) model, the dragon consists of 16 puppets dedicated to flying, crawling, or breathing fire.

The film received generally positive reviews from critics, but it performed poorly at the box office, grossing $14.1 million worldwide against a production budget of $18 million. It was nominated for the Academy Award for Best Original Score, which went to Chariots of Fire. It was nominated for a Hugo Award for Best Dramatic Presentation, again given to Raiders of the Lost Ark. On October 21, 2003, Dragonslayer was released on DVD in the United States by Paramount Home Entertainment. The film was re-released in remastered format on Blu-ray and 4K Ultra HD on March 21, 2023, in the U.S. by Paramount Home Entertainment.

== Plot ==
Urland, a sub-Roman British kingdom near the River Ur, is besieged by the dragon Vermithrax Pejorative. To appease the dragon, King Casiodorus offers it virgin girls selected every equinox by lottery.

A delegation led by a young Urlander named Valerian goes to Cragganmore to seek help from Ulrich, the last sorcerer. Tyrian, the captain of Casiodorus's Royal Guard, doubts Ulrich's abilities and challenges him to demonstrate his power. Ulrich invites Tyrian to stab him to prove his magical powers, but is killed in the process. Ulrich's servant Hodge cremates the sorcerer's body and places the ashes in a leather pouch.

Ulrich's young apprentice, Galen Bradwarden, is selected by the sorcerer's magical amulet as its next owner and he joins the delegation. En route to Urland, he discovers that Valerian is a woman, disguised to avoid being selected in the lottery. To discourage the expedition, Tyrian mortally wounds Hodge who, before dying, hands Galen Ulrich's ashes and reveals that the sorcerer wanted them spread over "burning water".

In Urland, Galen magically seals the entrance to Vermithrax's lair with a rockslide. Tyrian apprehends Galen during a celebration in Valerian's home village of Swanscombe and takes him to Castle Morgenthorme, where Casiodorus accuses the young sorcerer of having provoked rather than killed Vermithrax. Casiodorus confiscates the amulet and imprisons Galen. His daughter, Princess Elspeth, visits Galen, who mentions rumors that the lottery is rigged; it excludes her name and those others whose families are rich enough to bribe Casiodorus into disqualifying their daughters. Casiodorus cannot lie convincingly when Elspeth confronts him over this.

Meanwhile, Vermithrax escapes its prison, causing an earthquake which allows Galen to escape from his cell. A travelling holy man, Brother Jacopus, leads his congregation to confront Vermithrax, denouncing it as the Devil. Vermithrax incinerates him and then heads for Swanscombe, burning all in its path.

When the lottery begins anew to placate the dragon, Elspeth rigs the draw so that only her name can be chosen. Desperate, Casiodorus returns the amulet to Galen so that he might save Elspeth. To rescue Elspeth, Galen arms himself with a fireproof shield made from Vermithrax's shed scales and a magically enchanted spear called Sicarius Dracorum (transl. Dragon Slayer). While attempting to save Elspeth, he fights and kills Tyrian. Elspeth, however, descends into Vermithrax's cave, wanting to make amends for her prior exclusion from the lottery. Galen follows her and finds young dragons feasting on her corpse. He slays them and proceeds to find Vermithrax resting within an underground lake of fire. He wounds Vermithrax, but the spear's shaft is broken in the battle and only his shield saves him from incineration.

Valerian convinces Galen to leave Swanscombe with her; as they prepare to depart, the amulet gives Galen a vision of the "burning water" within Vermithrax's cave. Galen realizes that Ulrich planned his own death and cremation, being too old and frail to make the journey himself. Galen returns to the cave and spreads the ashes over the fiery lake, thus resurrecting Ulrich. The old sorcerer reveals that his time is short, and that Galen must destroy the amulet "when the time is right". Ulrich then transports himself to a mountaintop, summons a storm and confronts Vermithrax. In the ensuing battle, Vermithrax snatches Ulrich and flies away with him. Cued by Ulrich, Galen crushes the amulet with a rock, causing the sorcerer's body to explode and kill Vermithrax, which falls from the sky.

Casiodorus arrives and takes the credit for slaying the dragon by driving a sword into Vermithrax's carcass while the Urlanders, newly converted to Christianity, claim God as their hero. While leaving Urland with Valerian, Galen confesses that he misses both Ulrich and the amulet, and regrets not having a horse. A white horse then appears, insinuating that the amulet's power is now within Galen. The couple mounts the horse and ride away.

== Cast ==
- Peter MacNicol as Galen Bradwarden
- Caitlin Clarke as Valerian of Swanscombe
- Ralph Richardson as Ulrich of Cragganmore
- John Hallam as Tyrian
- Peter Eyre as King Casiodorus Ulfilas
- Albert Salmi as Greil (dubbed by Norman Rodway)
- Sydney Bromley as Hodge
- Chloe Salaman as Princess Elspeth Ulfilas
- Emrys James as Simon of Swanscombe, Valerian's father
- Roger Kemp as Horsrick, Casiodorus's Chamberlain
- Ian McDiarmid as Brother Jacopus
- Ken Shorter as Jerbul

== Production ==
=== Conception ===
According to Hal Barwood, Matthew Robbins and he got the inspiration for Dragonslayer from The Sorcerer's Apprentice sequence in Fantasia. They later came up with a story after researching St. George and the Dragon. Barwood and Robbins rejected the traditional conceptions of the medieval world to give the film more realism: "Our film has no knights in shining armor, no pennants streaming in the breeze, no delicate ladies with diaphanous veils waving from turreted castles, no courtly love, no holy grail. Instead, they set out to create a very strange world with a lot of weird values and customs, steeped in superstition, where the clothes and manners of the people were rough, their homes and villages primitive, and their countryside almost primeval, so that the idea of magic would be a natural part of their existence." For this reason, they chose to set the film after the end of Roman rule in Britain, prior to the arrival of Christianity. Barwood and Robins began to hastily work on the story outline on June 25, 1979, and completed it in early August. They received numerous refusals from various film studios, due to their inexperience in budget negotiations. The screenplay was eventually accepted by Paramount Pictures and Walt Disney Pictures, becoming the two studios' second joint effort after Popeye (1980).

=== Dragon ===
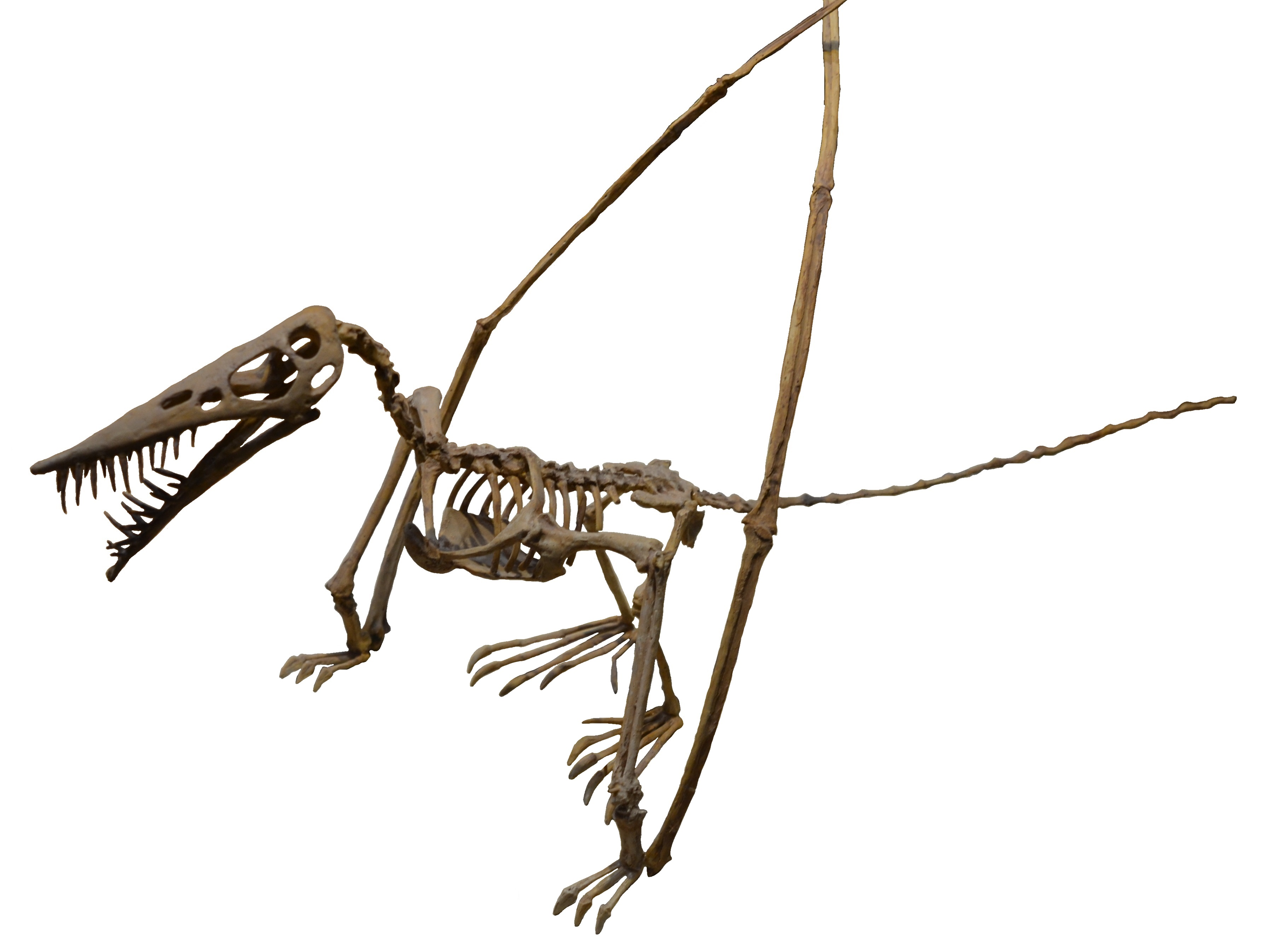
According to Barwood, the dragon's basic body plan was based on that of the Jurassic pterosaur Rhamphorhynchus.

About 25% of the film's budget went into the dragon's special effects. Graphic artist David Bunnett was assigned to design the look, and was fed ideas on the movement mechanics, and then rendered the concepts on paper. They decided early to emphasize flying, because the most important sequence is the final battle. Bunnett gave it a degree of personality, deliberately trying to avoid the creature from Alien, which he believed was "too hideous to look at".

Ken Ralston's flying model of the dragon, Vermithrax Pejorative

After Bunnett handed his storyboard panels to the film crew, the dragon design used a wide variety of techniques. The final creature is a composite of several different models. Phil Tippett of ILM finalized the design, and sculpted a reference model, which Danny Lee of Disney Studios closely followed in constructing the larger dragon props for close-up shots. Two months later, Lee's team finished a 16-foot head and neck assembly, a 30-foot tail, thighs, legs, claws capable of grabbing a man, and a 30-foot-wide (9.1 m) wing section. The parts were flown to Pinewood Studios outside London in the cargo hold of a Boeing 747.

Brian Johnson was hired to supervise the special effects, and began planning on- and off-set effects with various specialists. Dennis Muren, the effects cameraman, stated, "We knew the dragon had a lot more importance to this film than some of the incidental things that appeared in only a few shots in Star Wars or The Empire Strikes Back. The dragon had to be presented in a way that the audience would be absolutely stunned."

After the completion of principal shooting, a special-effects team of 80 people at ILM studios in northern California worked eight months in producing 160 composite shots of the dragon. Chris Walas sculpted and operated the dragon head used for close-up shots. The head measured 8 ft in length. The model was animated by a combination of radio controls, cable controls, air bladders, levers, and by hand—thus giving the illusion of a fully coordinated face with a wide range of expressions. Real World War II-era flamethrowers were used for the dragon's fire-breathing effects. The animals used for the dragon's vocalizations included lions, tigers, leopards, jaguars, alligators, pigs, camels, and elephants.

Phil Tippett built a model for the dragon's walking scenes. He did not want to use standard stop motion animation techniques, and had his team build a dragon model that would move during each exposure, rather than in between, as was once the standard. This process, named go motion by Tippett, was tested with motion control in The Empire Strikes Back. To make the motion even smoother, they decided to use a motorized rod puppet with a computer program that recorded the creature's movements in motion as a real animal would move, which added motion blur and removed the jerkiness common in prior stop-motion films.

Ken Ralston was assigned to the flying scenes. He built a model with an articulated aluminum skeleton for a wide range of motion. Ralston shot films of birds flying to incorporate their movements into the model. As with the walking dragon, the flying model was filmed using go motion techniques. The camera was programmed to tilt and move at various angles to convey the sensation of flight.

=== Casting ===
Peter MacNicol first met Robbins in the office of casting director, Debby Brown, who had seen MacNicol's work as Benvolio in Romeo and Juliet at the Guthrie Theater in Minneapolis. She had left a note backstage for him, encouraging him to move to New York, saying, "he would do well there". He took her advice. On his first day in New York City, MacNicol stopped by Brown's office to tell her he was now a Manhattan resident. While there, he heard the loud voices of actors coming from Brown's audition room. He asked Brown if anything right for him was in the project. She responded with a smile, "Well...actually, there is." An hour later, MacNicol was the front runner for the role of Galen. He was flown to England along with Caitlin Clarke for a screen test. Within a day or two, Paramount and Disney had said yes, and he was renting a flat in Chelsea. MacNicol had grown up riding horses—his first paid job was on a ranch near Arlington, Texas—so the young actor knew how to ride, even jump hurdles without a saddle, but during his pre-filming, he needed to learn to ride the type of trooper-style saddle they were using in the movie. Because he would have to ride on camera during action sequences, his riding skills had to be stress-tested. "They took away my stirrups, they took away my reins and whipped the horse, and then they told me to windmill my arms and turn a complete circle in the saddle. Then, they took away the saddle!" The young actor had already worked for two years in classical repertory theater and was highly trained in voice production. Nevertheless, a voice coach was hired to achieve the mid-Atlantic sound the role required. Having studied stage combat at the University of Minnesota (two years of classes in tumbling, foil, saber, rapier, and dagger), he was eager to do as much of the fighting as they would allow. The role also required some juggling and magic tricks. For this, he was mentored by British prestidigitator Harold Taylor, who had previously performed for the British royal family.

Caitlin Clarke was initially hesitant to involve herself in the film, as she was preparing to audition for a play in Chicago. Her agent insisted, though, and after doing an audition tape, was called back for more tests. Clarke failed them but managed to pass after doing another test at Robbins's insistence. She got along well with Ralph Richardson and stated that he taught her more in one rehearsal than she had learned in years of acting classes.

=== Set design ===
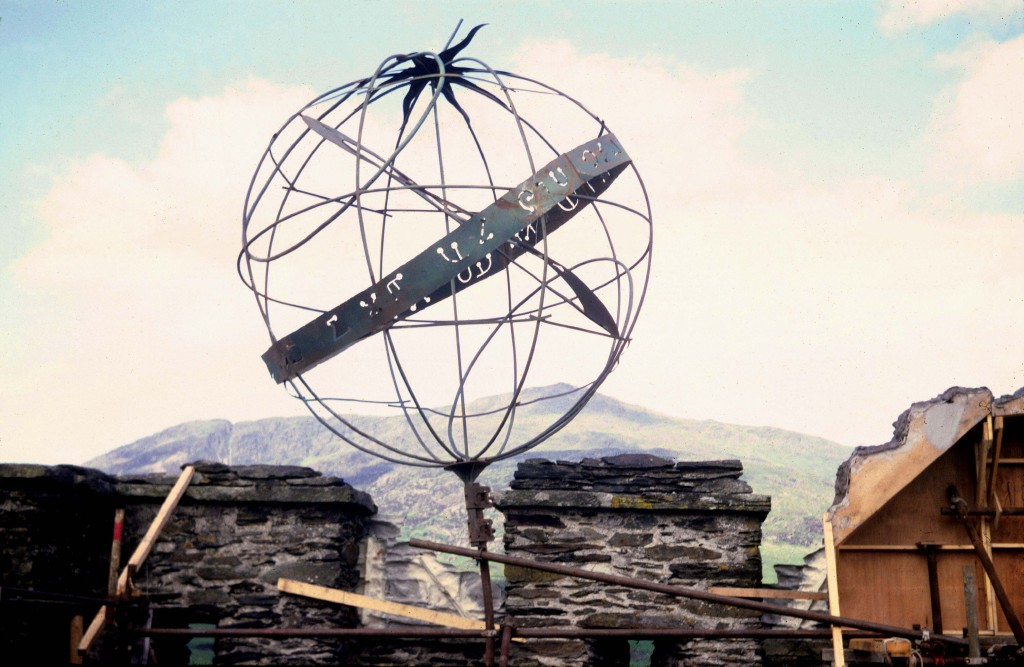
Ulrich's Castle looks over to Moel Siabod, Dolwyddelan Castle, North Wales.

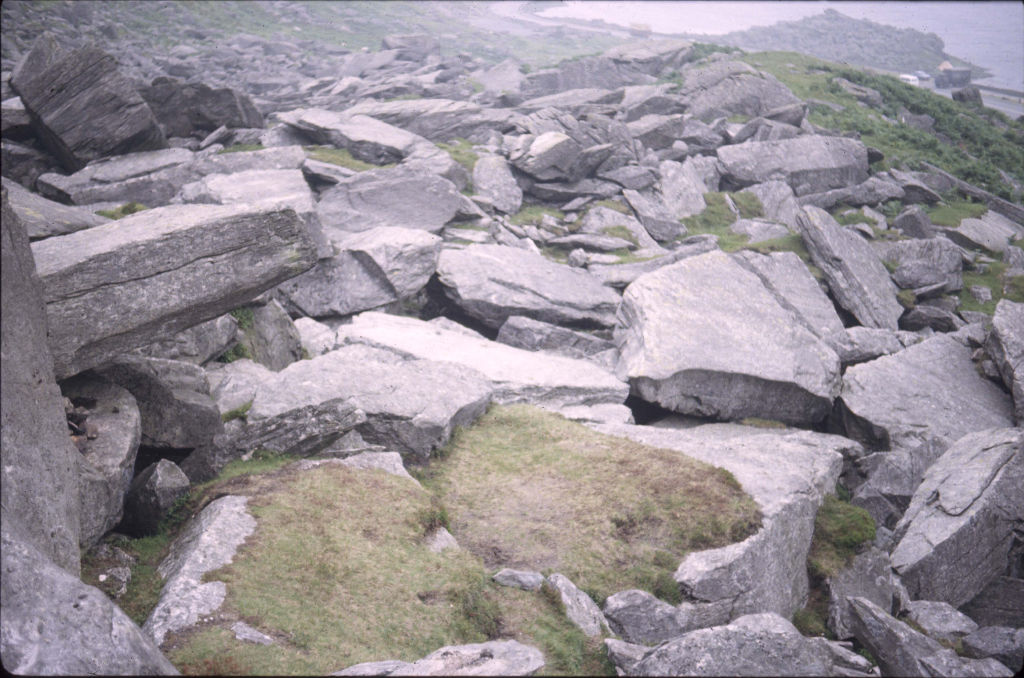
The location of Valerian's speech and handing a shield (made from the Dragon's scales) to Galen is below Tryfan, Llyn Ogwen, North Wales.

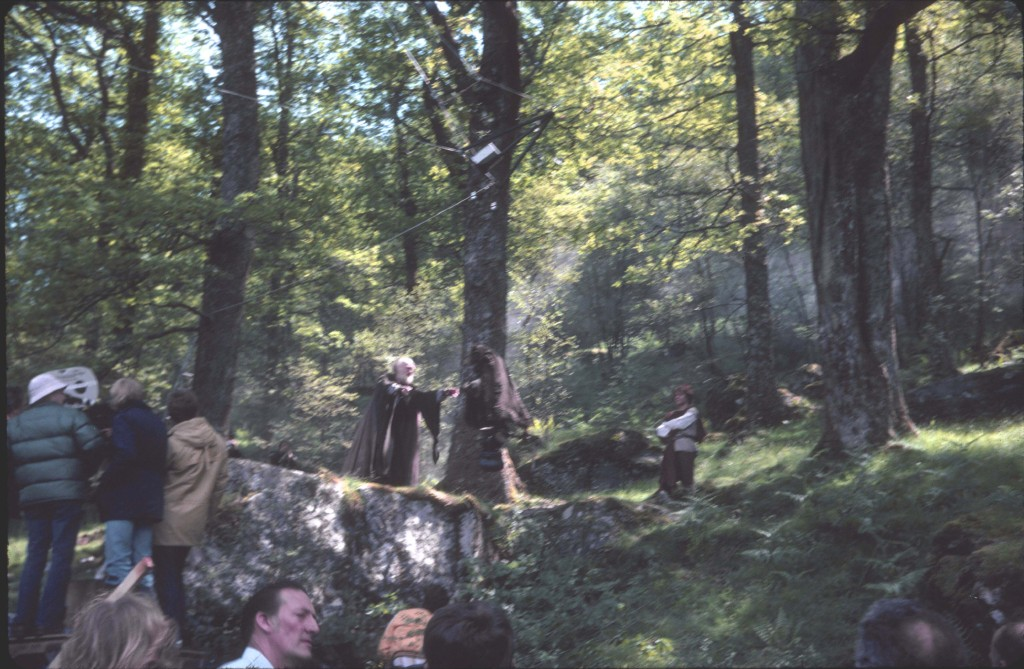
Galen (Peter MacNicol) and Hodge (Sydney Bromley) rehearsing for the pack levitation scene. Director Mathew Robbins is monitoring through the camera in Capel Curig, North Wales

Elliot Scott was hired to design the sets of the film's sixth-century world. He temporarily converted the 13th-century Dolwyddelan Castle into Ulrich's ramshackle sixth-century fortress, to the surprise of the locals. He built the entire village of Swanscombe on a farm outside London. Although Scott extensively researched medieval architecture in the British Museum and his own library, he took some artistic liberties in creating the thatched-roof houses, the granary, Simon's house and smithy, and Casiodorus's castle, because he was unable to find enough information on their exact look. He built the interior of the dragon's lair, using 25,000 cubic feet (710 m^{3}) of polystyrene and 40 tons of Welsh slate and shale. The shots of the Welsh and Scottish landscapes were extended through the use of over three dozen matte paintings. Nearly all of the outdoor scenes were shot in North Wales. The final scene was shot in Skye, Scotland.

=== Costumes ===
The costumes were designed by Anthony Mendelson, who consulted the British Museum, the London Library, and his own reference files to evoke the designs of the early Middle Ages. They are roughly stitched and use colors that would have been possible with the vegetable dyes of the time. The costumes of Casiodorus and his court were designed of fine silk, as opposed to the coarsely woven clothes of the Urlanders.

=== Music ===
The film's Academy Award-nominated score was composed by Alex North. The score's linear conception was developed through transparently layered and polyphonic orchestral texture, dominated by a medieval-style modal harmony. It was largely based on five major thematic concepts:

1. The suffering of the Urlanders
2. A "magic" motif
3. The amulet
4. The sacrificial virgins
5. The relationship between Galen and Valerian

North had six weeks to compose the score, which features music rejected from his score for Stanley Kubrick's 2001: A Space Odyssey. The opening sequence of Dragonslayer features a reworking of his original music for the opening of 2001's "Dawn of Man" sequence—which in that final film is played without music—and a waltz representing the dragon in flight that had been a variation of the cue "Space Station Docking", which in the final cut of 2001 was replaced by "The Blue Danube". North was disappointed by the resulting dragon scenes, as they do not use the entirety of the pieces he composed for them. He later stated that he had written "a very lovely waltz for when the dragon first appears, with just a slight indication that this may not be a bad dragon". The waltz was replaced by tracks used earlier in the movie.

The score was widely praised. Pauline Kael wrote in the New Yorker that the score was a "beauty", and that "at times, the music and the fiery dragon seem one". Royal S. Brown of Fanfare Magazine praised the soundtrack as "one of the best scores of 1981".

On April 22, 2010, a limited-edition soundtrack CD was released on La-La Land Records.

== Reception ==
=== Box office ===
The film grossed just over $14 million in the US with an estimated budget of $18 million. It later became a cult film.

=== Critical response ===
At the review aggregator website Rotten Tomatoes, the film has an 84% score based on 38 reviews, with an average rating of 6.8/10. The site's critic consensus reads, "Dragonslayer puts a realistic spin — and some impressive special effects — on a familiar tale." At Metacritic, the film has a weighted average score of 68 out of 100 based on 13 critics, indicating "generally favorable" reviews.

The book Flights of Fancy: The Great Fantasy Film says: "Dragonslayer is a compelling and often brilliant fantasy film [... but] it seeks, as well, to impose modern sensibilities on its medieval characters and plot—20th-century political, sociological, and religious sensibilities, which only serve to dilute its particular strengths."

Gene Siskel and Roger Ebert both gave the film three stars out of four in their respective print reviews. Siskel praised the "dazzling special effects" and the "convincing portrait by Ralph Richardson of the aged magician Ulrich", and Ebert called the scenes involving the dragon "first-rate".

Kevin Thomas of the Los Angeles Times called Vermithrax "the greatest dragon yet", and praised the film for its effective evocation of the Dark Ages.

David Denby of New York praised Dragonslayer's special effects and lauded the film as being much better than Excalibur and Raiders of the Lost Ark.

David Sterritt of The Christian Science Monitor praised the sets and pacing of the film, but criticized it for lack of originality, stressing that MacNicol and Richardson's characters bore too many similarities to the heroes of Star Wars. A similar critique was given by John Coleman of the New Statesman, who called the film a "turgid sword-and-sorcery fable, with Ralph Richardson in a backdated kind of Star Wars of Alec Guinness role".

Tim Pulleine of the Monthly Film Bulletin criticized the film's lack of narrative drive and clarity to supplement the special effects. Upon the film's first television broadcast, Gannett News Service columnist Mike Hughes called the story "slight" and "slow-paced", but admired a "lyrical beauty to the setting and mood". Nonetheless, he warned: "In movie theaters, that came across wonderfully; on a little TV screen, this may be strictly for specialized tastes."

Alex Keneas of Newsday criticized the focus on superstition, and for being "bereft of any sense of medieval time, place and society".

Larry DiTillio reviewed Dragonslayer for Different Worlds magazine and stated, "Much imagination went into the recreation of this world and fans will revel in it when they see it."

Christopher John reviewed Dragonslayer in Ares magazine and commented, "Though the dialogue is occasionally stiff, there is a believable reality. When the people and setting of a fantasy are as carefully wrought as they are here, it is easy to get an audience to accept as small and wonderful a thing as a dragon."

C. J. Henderson reviewed Dragonslayer for Pegasus magazine and stated that "So, what happened? Basically, special effects aside, it was a terrible film. The acting (outside of Ralph Richardson) was pedestrian, the story was skimpy and fairly bothersome, and the characters did not come across as fully real. The third century was not the time of women's lib. When the best performance in a film is given by the technical staff and not the actors, the film is usually in trouble."

Dirk Libbey of CinemaBlend describes that Dragonslayer "tends to get overlooked. Even if you do remember it, there's a decent chance you had no idea it was technically a Disney movie, as it was a far cry from their normal output in the early '80s and thus the Disney name was largely left off the film."

==== Vermithrax Pejorative ====
Guillermo del Toro has stated that along with Maleficent in Sleeping Beauty, Vermithrax is his favorite cinematic dragon. He further stated that: "One of the best and one of the strongest landmarks [of dragon movies] that almost nobody can overcome is Dragonslayer. The design of Vermithrax Pejorative is perhaps one of the most perfect creature designs ever made."

A Song of Ice and Fire author George R. R. Martin once ranked it the fifth-best fantasy film of all time, and called Vermithrax "the best dragon ever put on film [with] the coolest dragon name". Vermithrax is mentioned as an Easter egg in a list of dragons' names in the fourth episode of that book series adaptation, Game of Thrones. Fantasy author Alex Bledsoe stated: "...everyone has a 'first dragon', the one that awoke their sense of wonder about the creatures. For many it's Anne McCaffrey's elaborate world of Pern, where genetically engineered intelligent dragons bond with their riders; for others, it's Smaug in The Hobbit, guarding his hoard deep in a cave. But for me, it was the awesome Vermithrax from the 1981 film, Dragonslayer."

During filming of Return of the Jedi, in which Ian McDiarmid, who portrays minor character Brother Jacopus in Dragonslayer, stars as the film's main antagonist, Emperor Palpatine, the ILM crew jokingly placed a model of Vermithrax in the arms of the Rancor model and took a picture. The picture was included in the book Star Wars: Chronicles. A creature based on the appearance of this dragon appears in one of Jabba the Hutt's creature pens in Inside the Worlds of Star Wars Trilogy.

== Related media ==
A novelization, Dragonslayer, was written by Wayland Drew, that delves deeper into the background of many of the characters.

Marvel Comics published three formats of Dragonslayer adaptations in 1981; all were by the same team. These were a magazine-sized issue, a two-issue standard comic-sized adaptation, and a paperback format (Marvel Illustrated) of the two comic books in 160 pages, due to the smaller pages. Credits include writer Dennis O'Neil, and artists Marie Severin and John Tartaglione, in Marvel Super Special #20.

Simulations Publications, Inc. produced the board game Dragonslayer, designed by Brad Hessel and Redmond A. Simonsen.

Australian label Southern Cross initially released an unauthorized soundtrack album in 1983 on LP (a boxed audiophile pressing, at 45 rpm), and in 1990 on CD. The first official and improved CD release came in 2010 by U.S. label La-La Land Records. The new album features newly mastered audio from the original LCR (Left-Center-Right) mix, previously unreleased source music, and alternative takes.

== See also ==
- List of films featuring eclipses
