= USC School of Cinematic Arts =

Private media school at the University of Southern California

Coordinates: 34.023056°N 118.285833°W

- Motto: Limes regiones rerum
- Motto in English: Reality ends here
- Type: Private film school
- Established: 1929; 97 years ago
- Parent institution: University of Southern California
- Dean: Elizabeth M. Daley (1991–present)
- Faculty: 96 full time 219 part time
- Administrative staff: 144 full time 499 student workers
- Undergraduates: 876
- Postgraduates: 715
- Location: Los Angeles, California, U.S.
- Website: cinema.usc.edu

USC School of Cinematic Arts is the film and media school of the University of Southern California in Los Angeles, California. Founded in 1929, it developed from USC's early film instruction into a separate academic unit and took its current name in 2006. The school offers undergraduate and graduate programs in animation, cinema and media studies, film and television production, interactive media and games, media arts and practice, producing, screenwriting, and business-related study in cinematic movies.

== History ==
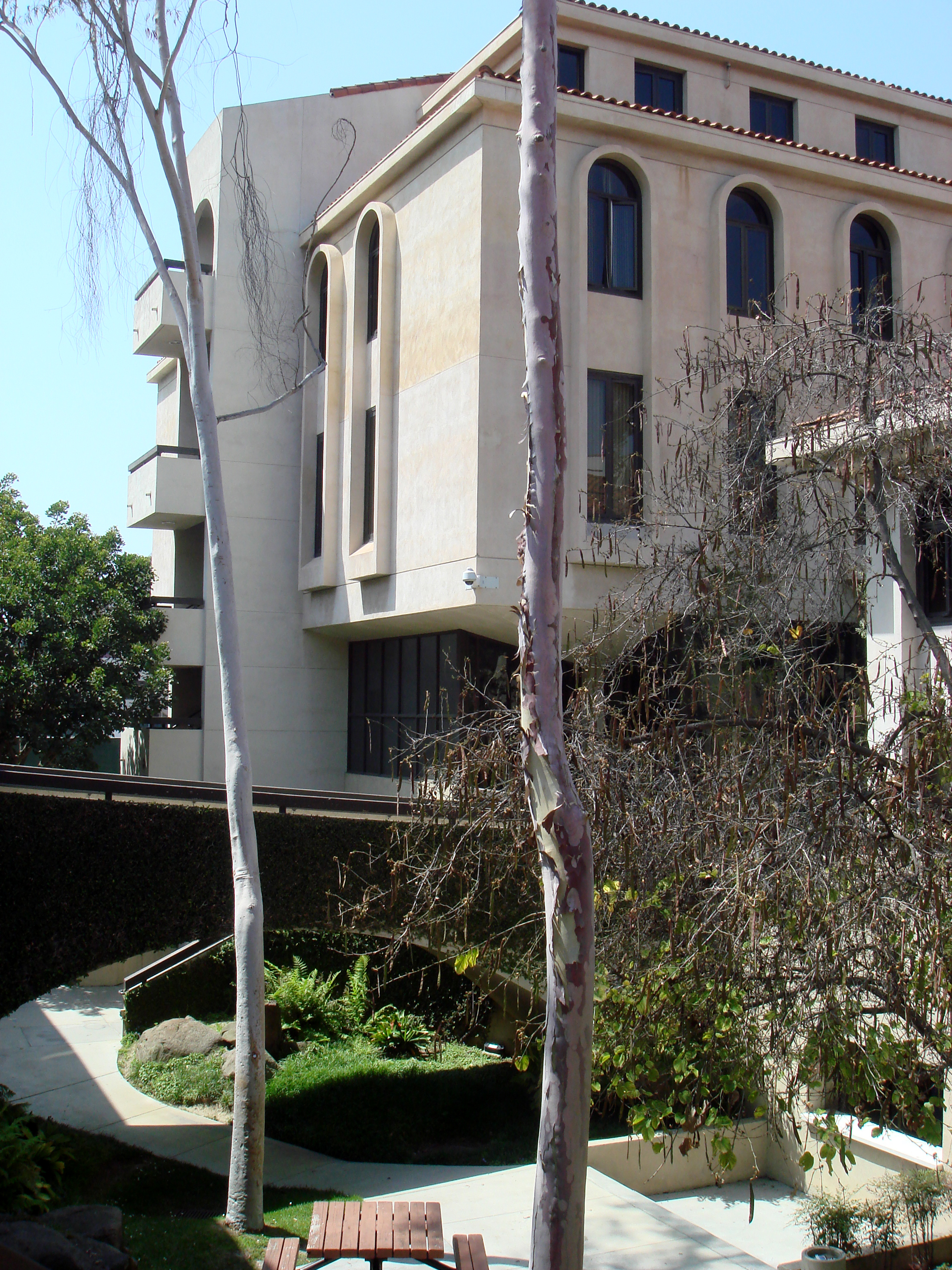

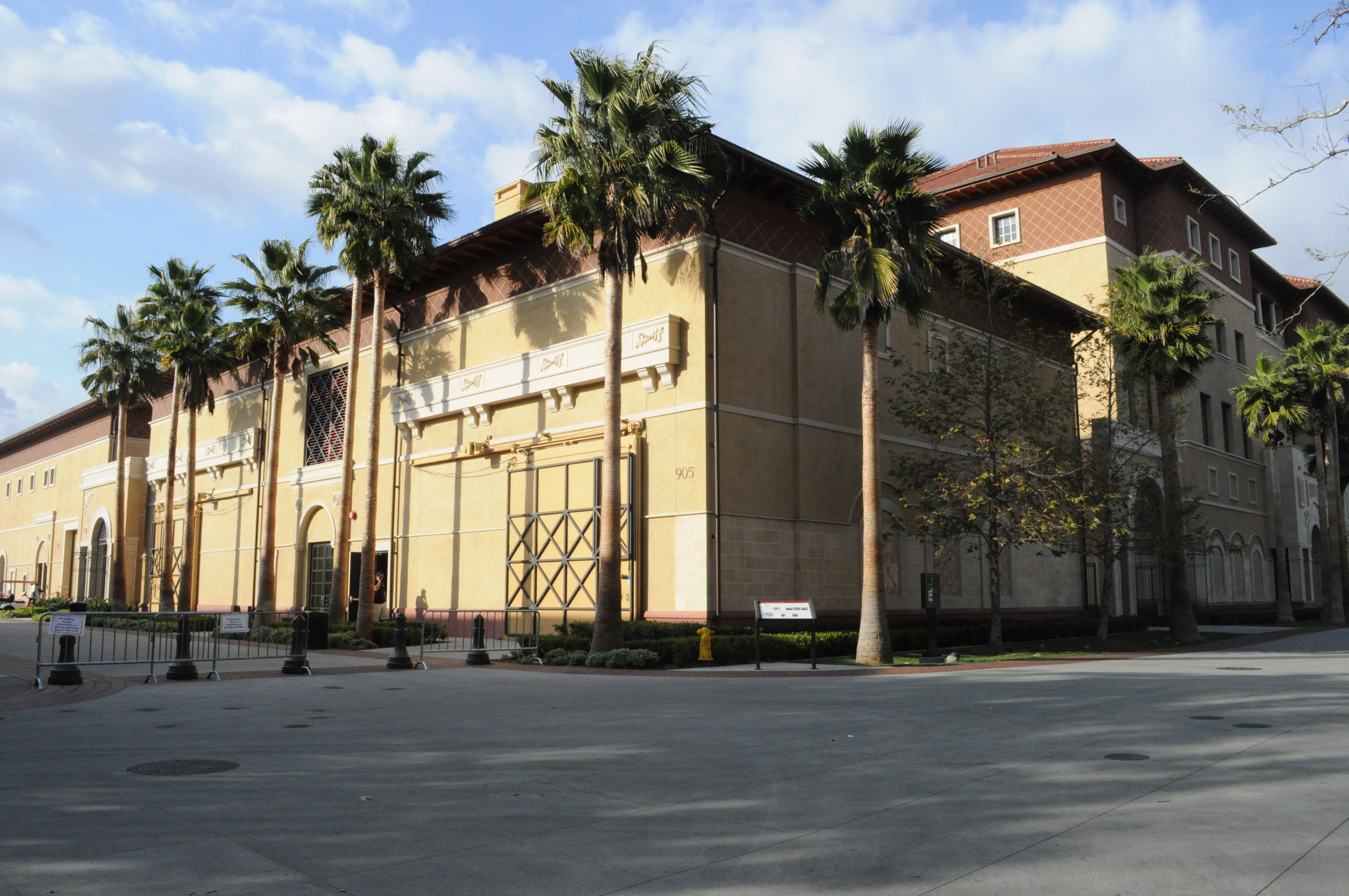
The George Lucas Instructional Building (top) was demolished in 2009 after the opening of the new Cinematic Arts Complex (bottom).

The school traces its origins to 1929, when the University of Southern California introduced the course Introduction to the Photoplay in collaboration with the Academy of Motion Picture Arts and Sciences. Early instructors and guest lecturers included Douglas Fairbanks, Mary Pickford, D. W. Griffith, Charlie Chaplin, Ernst Lubitsch, Irving Thalberg, and Darryl F. Zanuck.

In 1932, USC introduced a course of study leading to a bachelor's degree in cinema. The program developed within the College of Letters, Arts and Sciences as the Department of Cinematography and was renamed the Department of Cinema in 1940. By the late 1970s it had become the Division of Cinema-Television, and in 1983 it became an independent academic unit as the USC School of Cinema-Television. In 2006, the school adopted its current name, the USC School of Cinematic Arts.

In 2006, USC announced a US$175 million gift from alumnus George Lucas to support a major expansion of the school. The resulting Cinematic Arts complex opened in 2009.

In 2020, the school announced that it would remove an exhibit devoted to actor and former USC student John Wayne. According to the Daily Trojan, the materials were to be transferred to the school's archives for research and reference.

== Campus and facilities ==
The school is based on USC's University Park campus in Los Angeles. Its present facilities are centered on the Cinematic Arts complex, a four-acre, six-building development that opened in 2009. The complex houses production, post-production, screening, classroom, and administrative spaces.

The school previously operated from an earlier complex dedicated in 1984, which included the Harold Lloyd Motion Picture Sound Stage, the George Lucas Instructional Building, the Marcia Lucas Post-Production Building, the Steven Spielberg Music Scoring Stage, and the Johnny Carson Television Center.

Prior to 1984, the Department of Cinema was housed in The Stables, a cluster of "ramshackle" wooden buildings built by students after World War I. The phrase Reality Ends Here was carved in various locations within the complex, but most notably inscribed in ink above the main entrance, and maintained throughout the years.

== Leadership ==
Since 1991, the school has been led by dean Elizabeth M. Daley. Under her tenure, the school was renamed the USC School of Cinematic Arts in 2006 and moved into its current complex in 2009.

== Academic structure ==
The school offers undergraduate and graduate study across a range of disciplines in film, television, animation, games, writing, producing, and media studies. According to USC, its divisions and programs include the following:

- John C. Hench Division of Animation + Digital Arts
- Division of Cinema & Media Studies
- The Kevin Feige Division of Film & Television Production
- Interactive Media & Games
- Media Arts + Practice
- Peter Stark Producing Program
- John Wells Division of Writing for Screen & Television
- The John H. Mitchell Business of Cinematic Arts Program
- Expanded Animation Research + Practice

== See also ==
- The Dirty Dozen (filmmaking), a group of students in the 1960s
