= Pitfall =

Pitfall may refer to:

- Hazard
- Trapping pit, a large pit dug to catch animals
- Pitfall trap, a small pit dug to catch amphibians, insects and reptiles

== Film and television ==
- Pitfalls, 1914 film with Edwin August, produced by Pat Powers
- Pitfall (1948 film), directed by Andre DeToth
- Pitfall (1962 film), directed by Hiroshi Teshigahara
- The Pitfall (1989 film), a Swedish film
- Pitfall, a 2025 film by James Kondelik
- Pitfall (game show), hosted by Alex Trebek
- "Pitfall", a 1965 episode of season 12 of Lassie

== Video games ==
- Pitfall!, the 1982 original game
- Pitfall! (2012 video game), a sequel to the 1982 game

== Music ==
- Pitfalls, a 2019 album by Norwegian progressive music band Leprous
- "Pitfall", on the 1956 release Marty Paich Quartet featuring Art Pepper by Bill Pitman
- "Pitfalls", song by Film School on Film School (album)
- "Pitfalls", song on Industry (Richard Thompson and Danny Thompson album) 1997
