= Video game remake =

Closely adapted game

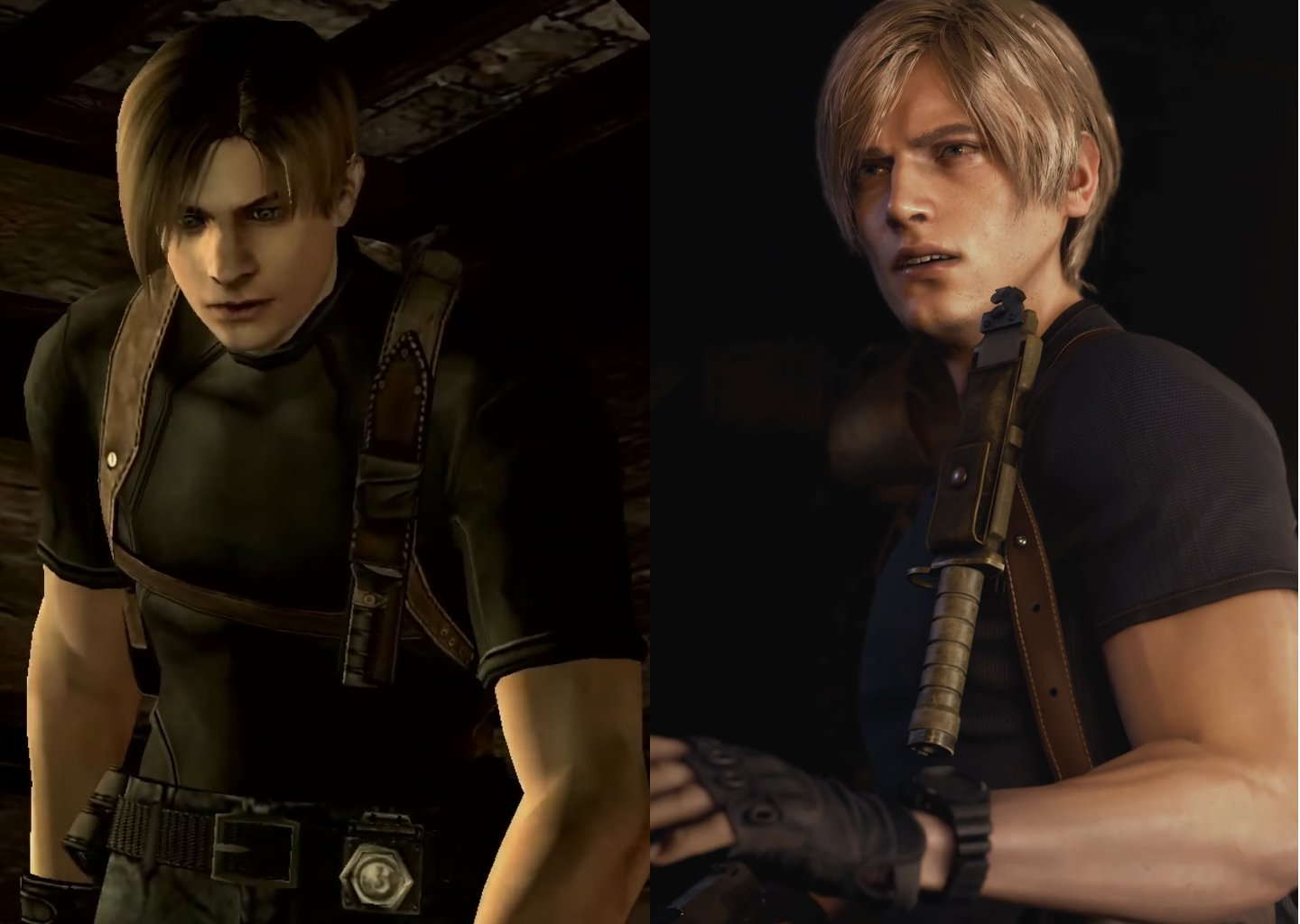
Comparison of Leon's appearance in Resident Evil 4 (2005) and its remake of the same name (2023)

A video game remake is a video game closely adapted from an earlier title, usually for the purpose of modernizing a game with updated graphics for newer hardware and gameplay for contemporary audiences. Typically, a remake of such game software shares essentially the same title, fundamental gameplay concepts, and core story elements of the original game, although some aspects of the original game may have been changed for the remake.

Remakes are often made by the original developer or copyright holder, and sometimes by the fan community. If created by the community, video game remakes are sometimes also called fan games and can be seen as part of the retro gaming phenomenon.

== Definition ==
A remake offers a newer interpretation of an older work, characterized by updated or changed assets. For example, The Legend of Zelda: Ocarina of Time 3D and The Legend of Zelda: Majora's Mask 3D for the Nintendo 3DS are considered remakes of their original versions for the Nintendo 64, and not a remaster or a port, since there are new character models and texture packs. The Legend of Zelda: Wind Waker HD for Wii U would be considered a remaster, since it retains the same, albeit updated upscaled aesthetics of the original.

Pokémon Red and Blue for the Game Boy (top) were remade for the Game Boy Advance as Pokémon FireRed and LeafGreen (bottom).

A remake typically maintains the same story, genre, and fundamental gameplay ideas of the original work. The intent of a remake is usually to take an older game that has become outdated and update it for a new platform and audience. A remake will not necessarily preserve the original gameplay especially if it is dated, instead remaking the gameplay to conform to the conventions of contemporary games or later titles in the same series in order to make a game marketable to a new audience.

For example, for Sierra's 1991 remake of Space Quest, the developers used the engine, point-and-click interface, and graphical style of Space Quest IV: Roger Wilco and The Time Rippers, replacing the original graphics and text parser interface of the original, but other elements, like the narrative, puzzles and sets, were largely preserved. Another example is Black Mesa, a remake built entirely from the ground up in the Source engine that remakes in-game textures, assets, models, and facial animations, while taking place in the events of the original Half-Life game. Resident Evil 2 from 2019 is a remake of the 1998 game of the same name; while the original uses tank controls and fixed camera angles, the remake features "over-the-shoulder" third-person shooter gameplay similar to Resident Evil 4 and more recent games in the series that allows players the option to move while using their weapons similar to Resident Evil 6.

== History ==
In the early history of video games, remakes were generally regarded as "conversions" and seldom associated with nostalgia. Due to limited and often highly divergent hardware, games appearing on multiple platforms usually had to be entirely remade. These conversions often included considerable changes to the graphics and gameplay, and could be regarded retroactively as remakes, but are distinguished from later remakes largely by intent. A conversion is created with the primary goal of tailoring a game to a specific piece of hardware, usually contemporaneous or nearly contemporaneous with the original release. An early example was Gun Fight, Midway's 1975 reprogrammed version of Taito's arcade video game Western Gun, with the main difference being the use of a microprocessor in the reprogrammed version, which allowed improved graphics and smoother animation than the discrete logic of the original.

The term "remake" in reference to video games dates back to 1976. At the Amusement & Music Operators Association (AMOA) arcade game show in November 1976, Atari debuted the racing video game Night Driver (along with two other racing titles, F-1 and Sprint 2) and Midway debuted 280 ZZZAP as Midnight Racer. Play Meter magazine, reporting on the show, used the term "re-make" to describe both Night Driver and Midnight Racer due to both being inspired by Nürburgring 1, which debuted earlier that year.

In 1980, Warren Robinett created Adventure for the Atari 2600, a graphical version of the 1970s text adventure Colossal Cave Adventure. Also in 1980, Atari released the first officially licensed home console game conversion of an arcade title, Taito's 1978 hit Space Invaders, for the Atari 2600. The game became the first "killer app" for a video game console by quadrupling the system's sales. Since then, it became a common trend to port arcade games to home systems since the second console generation, though at the time they were often more limited than the original arcade games due to the technical limitations of home consoles.

In 1985, Sega released a pair of arcade remakes of older home video games. Pitfall II: Lost Caverns was effectively a remake of both the original Pitfall! and its sequel Pitfall II: Lost Caverns with new level layouts and colorful, detailed graphics. That same year, Sega adapted the 1982 computer game Choplifter for the arcades, taking the fundamental gameplay of the original and greatly expanding it, adding new environments, enemies, and gameplay elements. This version was very successful, and later adapted to the Master System and Famicom. Both of these games were distinguished from most earlier conversions in that they took major liberties with the source material, attempting to modernize both the gameplay as well as the graphics.

Some of the earliest remakes to be recognized as such were attempts to modernize games to the standards of later games in the series. Some were even on the same platforms as the original, for example Ultima I: The First Age of Darkness, a 1986 remake of the original that appeared on multiple platforms, including the Apple II, the system the game originated on. Other early remakes of this type include Sierra's early-1990s releases of King's Quest, Space Quest and Leisure Suit Larry. These games used the technology and interface of the most recent games in Sierra's series, and original assets in a dramatically different style. The intent was not simply to bring the game to a new platform, but to modernize older games which had in various ways become dated.

With the birth of the retro gaming phenomenon, remakes became a way for companies to revive nostalgic brands. Galaga '88 and Super Space Invaders '91 were both attempts to revitalize aging arcade franchises with modernized graphics and new gameplay elements, while preserving many signature aspects of the original games. The 16-bit generation of console games was marked by greatly enhanced graphics compared to the previous generation, but often relatively similar gameplay, which led to an increased interest in remakes of games from the previous generation. Super Mario All-Stars remade the entire NES Mario series, and was met with great commercial success. Remake compilations of the Ninja Gaiden and Mega Man series followed. As RPGs increased in popularity, games in the Dragon Quest, Ys and Megami Tensei series were also remade. In the mid-'90s, Atari released a series of remakes with the 2000 brand, including Tempest 2000, Battlezone 2000, and Defender 2000. After Atari's demise, Hasbro continued the tradition, with 3D remakes of Pong, Centipede, and Asteroids.

By 1994 the popularity of CD-ROM led to many remakes with digitized voices and, sometimes, better graphics, although Computer Gaming World noted the "amateur acting" in many new and remade games on CD. Emulation also made perfect ports of older games possible, with compilations becoming a popular way for publishers to capitalize on older properties.

Budget pricing gave publishers the opportunity to match their game's price with the perceived lower value proposition of an older game, opening the door for newer remakes. In 2003, Sega launched the Sega Ages line for PlayStation 2, initially conceived as a series of modernized remakes of classic games, though the series later diversified to include emulated compilations. The series concluded with a release that combined the two approaches and included a remake of Fantasy Zone II that ran, via emulation, on hardware dating to the time of the original release, one of the few attempts at an enhanced remake to make no attempts at modernization. The advent of downloadable game services like Xbox Live Arcade and PlayStation Network has further fueled the expanded market for remakes, as the platform allows companies to sell their games at a lower price, seen as more appropriate for the smaller size typical of retro games. Some XBLA and PSN remakes include Bionic Commando Rearmed, Jetpac Refuelled, Wipeout HD (a remake not of the original Wipeout but of the two PlayStation Portable games), Cyber Troopers Virtual-On Oratorio Tangram, and Super Street Fighter II Turbo HD Remix.

Some remakes may include the original game as a bonus feature. For example, the 2004 remake of Metroid, Metroid Zero Mission, contains the original game as a bonus after beating the game once. The 2009 remake of The Secret of Monkey Island took this a step further by allowing players to switch between the original and remade versions on the fly with a single button press. This trend was continued in the sequel, and is also a feature in Halo: Combat Evolved Anniversary and later in Halo 2 Anniversary as part of Halo: The Master Chief Collection.

Remasters and remakes on the Nintendo DS include Super Mario 64 DS, Kirby Super Star Ultra, Diddy Kong Racing DS, Pokémon HeartGold and SoulSilver, Fire Emblem: Shadow Dragon, Final Fantasy III and IV, Dragon Quest IV through VI, and Kingdom Hearts Re:coded. The Nintendo 3DS's lineup also had numerous remasters and remakes, including The Legend of Zelda: Ocarina of Time 3D, Star Fox 64 3D, The Legend of Zelda: Majora's Mask 3D, Pokémon Omega Ruby and Alpha Sapphire, Metroid: Samus Returns, Fire Emblem Echoes: Shadows of Valentia, Mario & Luigi: Superstar Saga + Bowser's Minions, Luigi's Mansion, and Mario & Luigi: Bowser's Inside Story + Bowser Jr.'s Journey. Remasters on both the DS and 3DS include Cave Story, Myst, and Rayman 2: The Great Escape.

== Variations ==
=== Fan remake ===
Games unsupported by the rights-holders often spark remakes created by hobbyists and game communities. An example is OpenRA, which is a modernized remake of the classic Command & Conquer real-time-strategy games. Beyond cross-platform support, it adds comfort functions and gameplay functionality inspired by successors of the original games. Another notable examples are Pioneers, a remake and sequel in spirit to Frontier: Elite II; CSBWin, a remake of the dungeon crawler classic Dungeon Master; and Privateer Gemini Gold, a remake of Wing Commander: Privateer.

Skywind is a fan remake of Morrowind (2002) running on Bethesda's Creation Engine, utilising the source code, assets and gameplay mechanics of Skyrim (2011). The original game developers, Bethesda Softworks, have given project volunteers their approval. The remake team includes over 70 volunteers in artist, composer, designer, developer, and voice-actor roles. By 2014, the team had finished half of the remake's environment, over 10,000 new dialogue lines, and three hours of series-inspired soundtrack. The same open-development project is also working on Skyblivion, a remake of Oblivion (the game between Morrowind and Skyrim) in the Skyrim engine, and Morroblivion, a remake of Morrowind in the Oblivion engine (which still has a significant userbase on older PCs).

=== Demake ===
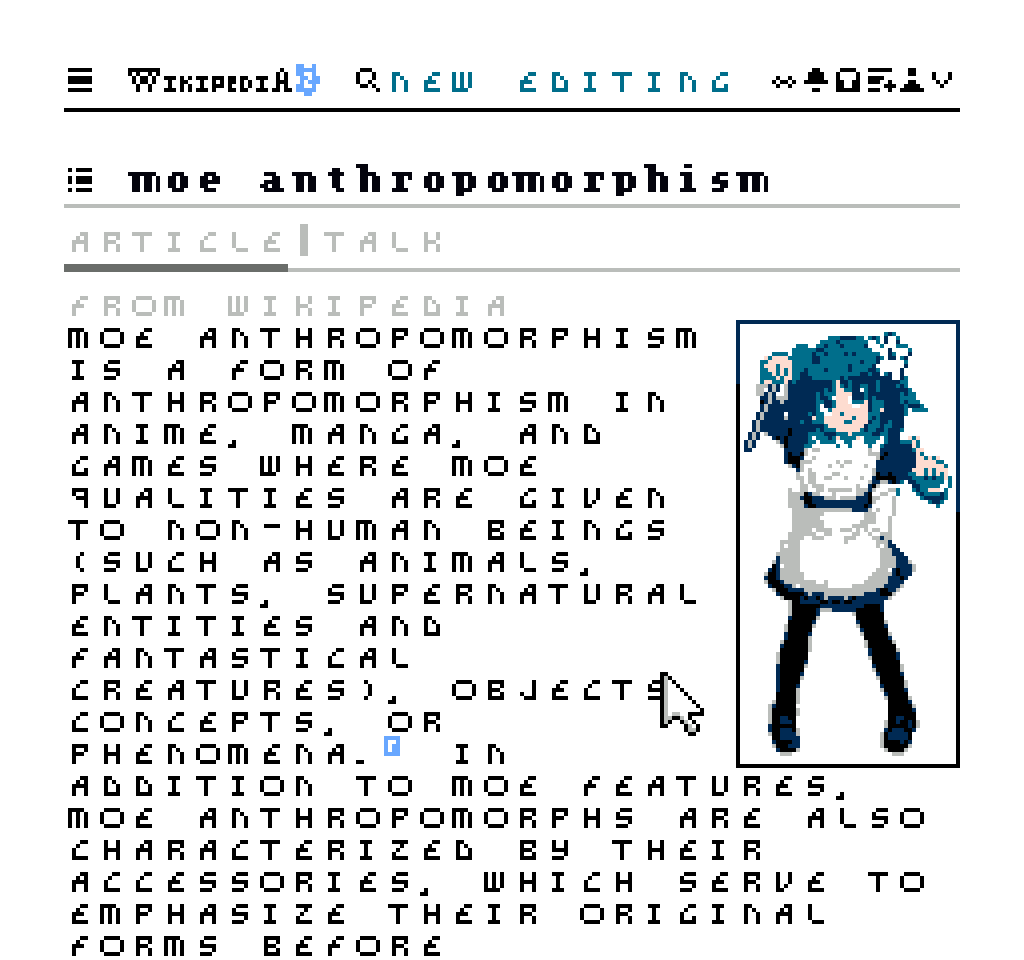
A mock-up of a Nintendo Entertainment System demake of Wikipedia

Although remakes typically aim to adapt a game from a more limited platform to a more advanced one, a rising interest in older platforms has inspired some to do the opposite, remaking or adapting modern games to the technical standards of older platforms, usually going so far as to implement them on obsolete hardware platforms, hence the term "Demake". Such games are either physical or emulated. The term demake may refer to games created deliberately with an art style inspired by older games of a previous video game console generation. The action platformer Mega Man 9 is an example of such a game.

==== Demakes for older hardware ====
Modern demakes often change the 3D gameplay to a 2D one. Popular demakes include Quest: Brian's Journey, an official Game Boy Color port of Quest 64; D-Pad Hero, a NES demake of Guitar Hero; Rockman 7 FC and Rockman 8 FC, NES-styled demakes of Mega Man 7 and 8, respectively; and Halo 2600, an Atari 2600 demake of Microsoft's Halo series. Some demakes are created to showcase and push the abilities of older generation systems such as the Atari 2600. An example of this is the 2013 game Princess Rescue, which is a demake of the NES title Super Mario Bros.

While most demakes are homebrew efforts from passionate fans, some are officially endorsed by the original creators such as Pac-Man Championship Edition's Famicom/NES demake being printed onto Japanese physical editions of the Namco Museum Archives as an original bonus game.

For much of the 1990s in China, Hong Kong, and Taiwan, black market developers created unauthorized adaptations of then-modern games such as Street Fighter II, Mortal Kombat, Phantasy Star IV, Final Fantasy VII, Tekken or Super Mario World for the Famicom, which enjoyed considerable popularity in the regions because of the availability of low-cost compatible systems.

==== Demake as style ====
There are also NES-style demakes of the Touhou Project games Embodiment of Scarlet Devil; Super Smash Land, an unofficial Game Boy-style demake of Super Smash Bros.; Bloodborne PSX, a PS1-style demake of Bloodborne; and Gang Garrison 2, a 2D pixelated demake of Team Fortress 2.

== Related terms ==
=== Port ===
A port is a conversion of a game to a new platform that relies heavily on existing work and assets. A port may include various enhancements like improved performance, resolution, and sometimes even additional content, but differs from a remake in that it still relies heavily on the original assets and engine of the source game. Sometimes, ports even remove content that was present in the original version. For example, the handheld console ports of Mortal Kombat II had fewer characters than the original arcade game and other console ports due to system storage limitations but otherwise were still faithful to the original in terms of gameplay.

Compared to the intentional video game remake or remaster which is often done years or decades after the original came out, ports or conversions are typically released during the same generation as the original (the exception being mobile gaming versions of PC games, such as Grand Theft Auto III, since mobile gaming platforms did not exist until the 2010s going forward). Home console ports usually came out less than a year after the original arcade game, such as the distribution of Mortal Kombat for home consoles by Acclaim Entertainment. Starting in the 2000s, as arcade debuts for games became less common, publishers have increasingly opted to release the video game simultaneously on several consoles first and then port to the PC later.

=== Remaster ===
A conversion that contains a great deal of remade assets may sometimes be considered a remaster or a partial remake, although video game publishers are not always clear on the distinction. For example, DuckTales: Remastered uses the term "Remastered" to distinguish itself from the original NES game it was based on, even though it is a clean-slate remake with a different engine and assets. Compared to a port which is typically released in the same era as the original, a remaster is done years or decades after the original in order to take advantage of generation technological improvements (the latter which a port avoids doing). Unlike a remake which often changes the now-dated gameplay, a remaster is very faithful to the original in that aspect (in order to appeal to that nostalgic audience) while permitting only a limited number of gameplay tweaks for the sake of convenience.

=== Reboot ===
Games that use an existing brand but are conceptually very different from the original, such as Wolfenstein 3D (1992) and Return to Castle Wolfenstein (2001) or Tomb Raider (1996) and Tomb Raider (2013) are usually regarded as reboots rather than remakes.

== See also ==
- List of video game remakes and remasters
- High-definition remasters for PlayStation consoles
- Game engine recreation
