= Pitfall 3D: Beyond the Jungle =

1998 platform video game

- North American PlayStation cover art
- Developer: Activision
- Publisher: Activision
- Director: David Pass
- Producer: John Lafleur
- Designers: Ryan Sinnock; Aaron Cammarata
- Programmers: Francois Yves Bertrand; Justin Lloyd; Gary Jesdanun
- Artists: Robert Stahl; Jeffery Buchanan; Christian Gossett
- Composer: David Logan
- Platform: PlayStation
- Release: NA: March 27, 1998; EU: April 9, 1998
- Genre: Platformer
- Mode: Single-player

Pitfall 3D: Beyond the Jungle is a 1998 platform video game developed by Activision's internal Console Development Group and published by Activision for the PlayStation. It is the fifth entry in the Pitfall series, following the 1994 installment Pitfall: The Mayan Adventure. It was first unveiled in 1996, when 3D platform gaming was still in its infancy, making designing the game difficult.

The development team for the PlayStation version included staff from the Virtua Fighter series, which was a pioneer in 3D gaming, but personnel changes led to Pitfall 3D being repeatedly delayed. It received mixed reviews upon release, being praised for its combat and exploration, but criticized for its camera; critics sharply disagreed over whether it was a successful effort at bringing Pitfall into 3D.

== Gameplay ==
Just as in its predecessor Pitfall: The Mayan Adventure, the original Pitfall! for the Atari 2600 is available as an Easter Egg. Unlike The Mayan Adventure, however, the game is set in a 3D environment which allows the player character to move in any direction. The player character also has a much wider range of attacks, some of which must be acquired through item pick-ups.

== Plot ==
In this adventure, Pitfall Harry Jr. meets a girl named Mira who enlists his aid in freeing her people from "The Scourge", an evil woman bent on controlling the world.

== Development ==
The developers decided to set the game in a magical parallel universe because there were no genuinely unexplored lands in the real world, and because it provided a story explanation for gameplay elements such as morphing creatures and floating platforms. Director Tony Grant explained the team's approach to level design: "If you think about Crash Bandicoot, it was extremely linear, and we don't like that. Mario 64 was really open, but the structure we've chosen is somewhere in the middle. We have definite paths, but they're not as limited as those in Crash. They branch a lot, but we wanted to make sure the player always has a sense of where to go."

The game's characters, creatures, and terrain were all modeled from concept sketches by comic book artist Christian Gossett. Gossett stated during development that coming up with designs that would be clear and not confusing in the game's environment was a challenge, since 3D gaming was a relatively new medium which he and the rest of the team were still learning how to work with. Two key members of the development team had a background in the Virtua Fighter series; lead programmer Franscois-Yves Bertrand developed the camera and collision system for Virtua Fighter and Virtua Fighter 2, and lead modeler/animator Jeff Buchanan worked on the models and animations for Virtua Fighter.

Pitfall Harry Jr. was voiced by Bruce Campbell. The developers, who were fans of the Evil Dead films which Campbell was most famous for starring in, included a number of lines referencing the films in the script, but Campbell objected that he was fed up with making Evil Dead references.

The game was demonstrated at the September 1996 European Computer Trade Show. Electronic Gaming Monthly said it was "one of the biggest surprises of the show" and "one of the games that'll really test the PlayStation and push its hardware to the limit." The release date was originally set for the second quarter of 1997, but slipped to the fourth quarter, and was pushed back again to March 1998. Causes for the delays included heavy personnel changes which occurred in early 1997.

== Reception ==
Reception

Aggregate score
| Aggregator | Score |
|---|---|
| GameRankings | 68% |

Review scores
| Publication | Score |
|---|---|
| AllGame | 4.5/5 |
| CNET Gamecenter | 8/10 |
| Edge | 6/10 |
| Electronic Gaming Monthly | 2/10, 4/10, 4/10, 7/10 |
| Famitsu | 26/40 |
| Game Informer | 8/10 |
| GameFan | 78/100, 82/100, 80/100 (Note: In GameFan, three critics gave it each a score out of 100.) |
| GameRevolution | B |
| GameSpot | 7.1/10 |
| IGN | 7/10 |
| Next Generation | 2/5 |
| Official U.S. PlayStation Magazine | 2/5 |
| Entertainment Weekly | B− |

Upon its release for the PlayStation, Pitfall 3D: Beyond the Jungle was met with divisive reviews. John Davison, Kraig Kujawa, and Crispin Boyer of Electronic Gaming Monthly all panned the game, saying that awkward camera angles make the task of jumping from platform to platform annoying and often require the player to make blind jumps, while their co-reviewer Kelly Rickards said every new level offers a fresh challenge, thereby maintaining an exciting pace, and that the game overall, while not perfect, is an enjoyable action-oriented adventure. GameSpot's Joe Fielder outright contradicted the complaints about the camera, asserting that "the intelligent camera ensures your perspective is always perfect for what you need to accomplish", and while discussing the gameplay remarked, "This may sound like fairly standard fare for a platform game, and it is, but Activision's got the timing down to an art (you have just enough time to plan your move and make it - no more, no less) and there's a complete lack of blind jumps - a frustrating bit that plagues most platformers." He also praised the soundtrack and the way the non-linear levels encourage exploration, and concluded that the game is fresh, original, and fun.

IGN hailed Pitfall 3D as one of the most successful attempts at 3D platforming to date, while acknowledging that it still had not solved the ongoing problem of the camera sometimes confounding the player's view. They particularly praised Activision's decision to keep movement primarily two-dimensional, thereby avoiding awkward control issues, and the way the game translates classic Pitfall elements into a three-dimensional world. Next Generation voiced no criticisms about the camera, but still considered the game a major disappointment, citing an inconsistent visual style, lack of gameplay innovation, and a game engine that had become outdated over the course of the game's long delays. They concluded, "There is some fun here, but the appeal is almost retro – there's nothing in Pitfall 3D that hasn't been seen before." GamePro acknowledged that the game often requires the player to make blind jumps, but regarded this as simply one of several aspects which demand precision and practice, making it a game strictly for patient and skilled players. They deemed it "a great mix of action and adventure". (Note: GamePro gave the PlayStation version 4.0/5 for sound, 4.0/5 for control, 4.5/5 for fun factor, and 4.5/5 for graphics.) The PlayStation version held a 68% on the review aggregation website GameRankings based on six reviews.

In Japan, the PlayStation version was ported and published by Victor Interactive Software under the name Pitfall 3D (ピットフォール3D, Pittofōru 3D) on December 10, 1998.
