= Saturday Supercade =

American animated television series

- Genre: Anthology; Comedy
- Directed by: Charles A. Nichols; John Kimball; Walt Kubiak; Bill Reed; Russ Moody
- Starring: Soupy Sales
- Voices of: Dick Beals; Billy Bowles; Bart Braverman; Arthur Burghardt; Nancy Cartwright; Peter Cullen; Ted Field Sr.; Pat Fraley; Marvin Kaplan; Robbie Lee; Sparky Marcus; Kenneth Mars; Mea Martineau; Julie McWhirter; David Mendenhall; Noelle North; Jim Piper; Peter Renaday; Robert Ridgely; Bob Sarlatte; Judy Strangis; B.J. Ward; Frank Welker
- Composers: Haim Saban; Shuki Levy; Dean Elliott
- Country of origin: United States
- Original language: English
- No. of seasons: 2
- No. of episodes: 23 (97 segments)

Production
- Executive producers: Joe Ruby; Ken Spears
- Running time: 32–43 minutes (10–13-minute segments)
- Production company: Ruby-Spears Enterprises

Original release
- Network: CBS
- Release: September 17, 1983 – December 1, 1984

Saturday Supercade is an American Saturday-morning animated anthology television series produced by Ruby-Spears Productions for CBS. It aired for two seasons from September 17, 1983 to December 1, 1984. It is an anthology series consisting of four 11-minute segments based on various video games, primarily from the golden age of arcade video games. In the first season, these segments included Frogger, Donkey Kong, and Donkey Kong Jr., with the fourth segment rotating weekly between Pitfall! and Q*bert. In the second season, the lineup of segments was revised to feature Q*bert, Donkey Kong, and new additions Kangaroo and Space Ace.

== Segments ==
=== Frogger ===
Frogger (voiced by Bob Sarlatte) is an ace reporter of the swamp who works at The Swamp Gazette. He and his friends Shellshock "Shelly" Turtle (voiced by Marvin Kaplan) and Fanny Frog (voiced by B.J. Ward) go out in search of crazy stories (sometimes about human behavior) to publish in the newspaper. Frogger also has to deal with his gruff boss and editor-in-chief Tex Toadwalker (voiced by Ted Field Sr.). As in the game, he often has an encounter with an alligator or gets flattened by a passing car. Unlike the game, Shelly revives Frogger using an ordinary air pump.

==== Episodes ====
Nº	Title	Original air date
1	"The Ms. Fortune Story"	September 17, 1983
2	"Spaced Out Frogs"	September 24, 1983
3	"The Who Took Toadwalker Story"	October 1, 1983
4	"Hydrofoil and Go Seek"	October 8, 1983
5	"The Great Scuba Scoop"	October 15, 1983
6	"The Headline Hunters"	October 22, 1983
7	"The Legs Croaker Story"	October 29, 1983
8	"The Blackboard Bungle"	November 5, 1983
9	"Good Knight, Frogger"	November 12, 1983
10	"Fake Me Out at the Ballgame"	November 19, 1983
11	"I Remember Mummy"	November 26, 1983
12	"Here Today, Pawned Tomorrow"	December 3, 1983
13	"Hop-Along Frogger"	December 10, 1983

=== Donkey Kong ===
Donkey Kong (voiced by Soupy Sales) has escaped from the circus and is on the loose, with Mario (voiced by Peter Cullen) and Pauline (voiced by Judy Strangis) chasing the ape. Similar to the original game, Donkey Kong will frequently grab Pauline and Mario has to save her. Plots typically center around the trio encountering crime with the villains conning the slow-witted Donkey Kong into doing their work and Mario and Pauline exposing the truth. After Mario and Pauline reveal the truth to Donkey Kong, the three of them team up to stop the antagonists' plans followed by Donkey Kong evading Mario and Pauline again.

==== Episodes ====
===== Season 1 (1983) =====
No. overall	No. in season	Title	Written by	Original release date
1	1	"Mississippi Madness"	Duane Poole and Tom Swale	September 17, 1983
2	2	"Gorilla Gangster"	Gary Greenfield	September 24, 1983
3	3	"Banana Bikers"	Michael Maurer	October 1, 1983
4	4	"The Incredible Shrinking Ape"	Mark Jones, Michael Maurer, and Richard Merwin	October 8, 1983
5	5	"Movie Mania"	Cliff Ruby and Elana Lesser	October 15, 1983
6	6	"Gorilla My Dreams"	Gordon Kent, Jack Enyart, Michael Maurer, and Richard Merwin	October 22, 1983
7	7	"Little Orphan Apey"	Unknown	October 29, 1983
8	8	"Circus Daze"	Duane Poole, Michael Maurer, Richard Merwin, Tom Dagenais, and Tom Swale	November 5, 1983
9	9	"The Great Ape Escape"	Richard Merwin	November 12, 1983
10	10	"Apey and the Snowbeast"	Unknown	November 19, 1983
11	11	"How Much is That Gorilla in the Window?"	Michael Brown	November 26, 1983
12	12	"Private Donkey Kong"	Unknown	December 3, 1983
13	13	"Get Along, Little Apey"	Michael Maurer and Richard Merwin	December 10, 1983

===== Season 2 (1984) =====
No. overall	No. in season	Title	Written by	Original release date
14	1	"Sir Donkey Kong"	Unknown	September 8, 1984
15	2	"The Pale Whale"	Unknown	September 15, 1984
16	3	"El Donkey Kong"	Matt Uitz	September 22, 1984
17	4	"New Wave Ape"	Richard Murphy	September 29, 1984
18	5	"Greenhouse Gorilla"	James Diamond	October 6, 1984
19	6	"Hairy Parent"	Sheryl Scarborough	October 13, 1984

=== Pitfall! ===
Pitfall Harry (voiced by Robert Ridgely), his niece Rhonda (voiced by Noelle North), and their cowardly pet Quickclaw the Mountain Lion (voiced by Kenneth Mars) explore jungles for hidden treasures, having many different adventures along the way. Quickclaw and Rhonda later appeared in Pitfall II: Lost Caverns and Super Pitfall.

==== Episodes ====
No.	Title	Written by	Original release date
1	"Pitfall's Panda Puzzle"	Unknown	September 17, 1983
2	"Amazon Jungle Bungle"	Unknown	September 24, 1983
3	"Raiders of the Lost Shark"	Jack Hanrahan	October 8, 1983
4	"Tibetan Treasure Trouble"	Unknown	October 22, 1983
5	"Masked Menace Mess"	Kayte Kuch	November 5, 1983
6	"The Saber Tooth Goof"	Unknown	November 19, 1983
7	"Pyramid Panic"	Unknown	December 3, 1983

=== Q*bert ===
In a 1950s-inspired world set in the town of Q*Berg, a teenage fur-covered creature named Q*bert (voiced by Billy Bowles), his girlfriend Q*Tee (voiced by Robbie Lee), his brother Q*Bit (voiced by Dick Beals), and his friends Q*Ball (voiced by Frank Welker), Q*Val (voiced by Robbie Lee), and Q*Mongus (voiced by Frank Welker) must deal with the resident bullies Coily, Ugg and Wrongway (all three voiced by Frank Welker), and Coily's girlfriend Viper (voiced by Julie McWhirter). As with the video game, the segment features "block-hopping" scenes, "swearing" bubbles, and occasional flying discs from the original game. New to the cartoon was Q*bert's use of "slippy-doos", a black ball projectile which he loaded and fired through his nose, producing an oil slick wherever the balls splattered. Slick and Sam (both voiced by Frank Welker) are also featured.

==== Episodes ====
===== Season 1 (1983) =====
Nº	Ep	Title	Original air date
1	1	"Disc Derby Fiasco"	October 8, 1983
2	2	"The Great Q-Tee Contest"	October 15, 1983
3	3	"Q-Bowl Rigamarole"	October 29, 1983
4	4	"Crazy Camp Creature"	November 12, 1983
5	5	"Thanksgiving for the Memories"	November 26, 1983
6	6	"Dog Day Dilemma"	December 10, 1983

===== Season 2 (1984) =====
Nº	Ep	Title	Original air date
7	1	"Take Me Out to the Q-Game"	January 19, 1984
8	2	"Noser, P.I."	June 15, 1984
9	3	"Hook, Line & Mermaid"	September 13, 1984
10	4	"Q-Historic Daze"	September 29, 1984
11	5	"Q-bert's Monster Mix-Up"	October 6, 1984
12	6	"Game Shoe Woe"	October 13, 1984
13	7	"The Wacky Q-Bot"	October 20, 1984
14	8	"Q-Beat It"	October 27, 1984
15	9	"Q-Urf's Up!"	November 3, 1984
16	10	"Little Green Nosers"	November 10, 1984
17	11	"Rebel Without a Q-Ause"	November 17, 1984
18	12	"Looking for Miss Q-Right"	November 24, 1984
19	13	"The Goofy Ghostgetters"	December 21, 1984

=== Donkey Kong Junior ===
Donkey Kong Jr. (voiced by Frank Welker) is searching for his father Donkey Kong following his escape from the circus. He befriends a greaser nicknamed "Bones" (voiced by Bart Braverman), who has a motorcycle and offers to help Junior find his father. Donkey Kong Jr.'s catchphrase is "Monkey muscle!", which he tells to himself and Bones to inspire self-confidence. Bones often serves as the voice of reason when Donkey Kong Jr. bites off more than he can chew.

==== Episodes ====
Nº	Title	Original air date
1	"Trucknapper Caper"	September 17, 1983
2	"Sheep Rustle Hustle"	September 24, 1983
3	"Rocky Mountain Monkey Business"	October 1, 1983
4	"Magnificent Seven-Year Olds"	October 8, 1983
5	"The Ventriloquist Caper"	October 15, 1983
6	"The Great Seal Steal"	October 22, 1983
7	"The Jungle Boy Ploy"	October 29, 1983
8	"Junior Meets Kid Dynamo"	November 5, 1983
9	"The Amazing Rollerskate Race"	November 12, 1983
10	"A Christmas Story"	November 19, 1983
11	"Gorilla Ghost"	November 26, 1983
12	"The Teddy Bear Scare"	December 3, 1983
13	"Double or Nothing"	December 10, 1983

=== Kangaroo ===
Joey Kangaroo (voiced by David Mendenhall), his mother "K.O." Katy Kangaroo (voiced by Mea Martineau), and Sidney Squirrel (voiced by Marvin Kaplan) must stop the Monkeybiz Gang members Bingo (voiced by Pat Fraley), Bango, Bongo, and Fred (all voiced by Frank Welker), four meddlesome monkeys who are known from making trouble at the local zoo run by the zookeeper Mr. Friendly (voiced by Arthur Burghardt). The Monkeybiz Gang would cause trouble by trying to escape from the zoo and Katy would have to help keep them in line.

==== Episodes ====
No.	Title	Written by	Original release date
1	"Trunkful of Trouble"	Gordon Kent and Paul Dini	September 8, 1984
2	"Zoo for Hire"	Unknown	September 15, 1984
3	"Bat's Incredible"	Jack Enyart	September 22, 1984
4	"The White Squirrel of Dover"	Mel Gilden	September 29, 1984
5	"The Birthday Party"	Unknown	October 6, 1984
6	"Having a Ball"	Unknown	October 13, 1984
7	"The Tail of the Cowardly Lion"	Maggie Ann Smith	October 20, 1984
8	"It's Carnival Time"	Unknown	October 27, 1984
9	"Lost and Found"	Ted Pedersen	November 3, 1984
10	"Joey and the Bananastalk"	Unknown	November 10, 1984
11	"Zoo's Who?"	Unknown	November 17, 1984
12	"The Egg and Us"	Unknown	November 24, 1984
13	"The Runaway Panda"	Unknown	December 1, 1984

=== Space Ace ===
Space Ace (voiced by Jim Piper) is the always smiling self-confident champion of the "Space Command", whereas when always "wimping out" to Dexter (voiced by Sparky Marcus) after being hit by the Infanto-Ray, he becomes clumsy and weak. With officer Kimberly (voiced by Nancy Cartwright), he works for Space Marshall Vaughn (voiced by Peter Renaday) to keep the peace in the universe. They fight the evil alien commander Borf (voiced by Arthur Burghardt) and keep him from invading Earth. Ace and Kim try to keep his 'wimping' situation secret and pretend that Dexter is Kim's little brother to Vaughn.

Again, as with Donkey Kong, Ruby-Spears took artistic license; in the video game, Dexter had certain chances to revert to Ace, his full-grown self, whereas in the cartoon the Ace/Dexter phases seemed to happen on their own and often at inconvenient times for the hero.

In the late 1990s, reruns of the show aired late at night on Cartoon Network. Segments have also been shown between programs on Boomerang.

==== Episodes ====
Nº	Title	Original air date
1	"Cute Groots"	September 8, 1984
2	"Cosmic Camp Catastrophe"	September 15, 1984
3	"Dangerous Decoy"	September 22, 1984
4	"Moon Missile Madness"	September 29, 1984
5	"Perilous Partners"	October 6, 1984
6	"Frozen in Fear"	October 13, 1984
7	"Age Ray Riot"	October 20, 1984
8	"Wanted: Dexter!"	October 27, 1984
9	"The Phantom Shuttle"	November 3, 1984
10	"Spoiled Sports"	November 10, 1984
11	"Calamity Kimmie"	November 17, 1984
12	"Three Ring Rampage"	November 24, 1984
13	"Infanto Fury"	December 1, 1984

== Rebroadcast and home video ==
The Space Ace segments from the show occasionally appeared as filler in between shows on Boomerang and Toonami.

The series has become considered partially lost in recent years due to a lack of reruns from rights issues between the various owners of the video game characters and the production company, as of 1996 is part of Warner Bros. Animation. In 2010, Warner Bros. Home Entertainment, who owns home distribution rights to Ruby-Spears programs, announced via their Facebook page that Saturday Supercade would be released through their Warner Archive Collection label, which had not materialized as of 2026.

In November 2015, Sony Pictures Home Entertainment released The Best of Q*bert on DVD in Region 1; Sony Pictures owned the rights to Q*bert due to Columbia Pictures owning Gottlieb during its development. The two-disc collection features 17 of the 19 episodes of the series.
