= Little League World Series Baseball =

- Genre: Sports
- Developers: NOW Production, Handheld Games, IguanaBee
- Publishers: Activision, GameMill Entertainment
- Platforms: Wii, Nintendo DS, PlayStation 3, Xbox 360, Nintendo Switch, PlayStation 4, PlayStation 5, Xbox One, PC, Xbox Series
- First release: Little League World Series 2008; August 5, 2008
- Latest release: Little League World Series 2022; August 17, 2022

Little League World Series Baseball is a series of sports video games. Based on the Little League World Series, there are four games in the series. The latest release was on August 17, 2022.

== Games ==
=== 2008 ===
Little League World Series Baseball 2008 was released on August 5, 2008 for the Wii and the Nintendo DS by Activision. It is the first game to be officially licensed by Little League Baseball for the seventh generation of consoles. The gameplay is also similar to the baseball game in Wii Sports and Mario Super Sluggers. The game is a part of Activision's Fun4All-brand in Europe.

The game begins when a player is taken to a main menu. They there can choose several different options, including tournament mode, exhibition mode and skill challenge mode. In tournament mode, a player chooses one of the 16 different regions, and tries to reach the Little League World Series by making it through pool play, then winning in the knockout round. In the Exhibition mode, a player can pick any two teams in the game against each other for a faster, less-complicated experience.

Screenshot from Home Run Tourney

The game has an extensive array of minigames called "Skill Challenges", which range from the power-hitting home run tourney to the accuracy-important Tic-tac-toe.

- In Home Run Tourney, a player sets the number of pitches, then tries to hit as many home runs as possible out of that number. Extra points are awarded when a player hits a hot-air balloon in the outfield, or when they hit consecutive home runs.
- In Pitching Darts, a board of squares with different colors is on the plate. Depending on the color of the square, a player must throw a fastball(red), change-up(yellow), curveball(green), or slider(blue) as accurately as possible. If the pitch hits the same-colored square as its color, it will make a mark there. If a pitch hits the incorrect color, play will pass to the next player.
- In Pitching bowling, a player is simply bowling from the pitchers mound. In ten frames, the player(s) must try to get as many pins as they can by pitching at them. Similar to Home Run Tourney, the point of the game is to hit the ball as far as you can.
- Similar to the basketball game H-O-R-S-E- in the sense that a player must hit the ball to a specific area of the field, or they get a letter of the word horse. They must get as many points as they can before they miss five times. They get bonus points for hitting the ball further, and are eliminated when they spell out the word horse.

=== 2009 ===
Little League World Series Baseball 2009 was developed by Japanese developer Now Production (NowPro). The game begins when a player is taken to the main menu. They there can choose several different options, including tournament mode, exhibition mode, and skill challenge mode. In Tournament mode, a player chooses one of the 16 different regions and tries to reach the Little League World Series by making it through regionals, pool play, and then winning the world series in the knockout round. In Exhibition mode, a player can pick any two teams in the game against each other for a faster, less-complicated experience. This is also the first game in the franchise to allow players to make their own team.

=== 2010 ===
Little League World Series Baseball 2010 was released in North America on July 20, 2010. The game begins when a player is taken to a main menu. They there can choose several different options, including tournament mode, exhibition mode, and skill challenge. In addition, the game features online leaderboards, Trophies and Achievements.

In tournament mode, a player chooses one of the 16 different regions, and tries to reach the Little League World Series by making it through pool play, then winning in the playoffs. In the Exhibition mode, a player can pick any two teams in the game against each other for a faster, less-complicated experience.

== Reception ==
Little League World Series 2008 Wii and DS games received mixed reactions from critics. Some call the game "Simple, yet tough to master." While others say it's "...best for the younger players." One of the main criticisms of the game, especially from its online gamers, has been its lack of Nintendo Wi-Fi Connection.

Little League World Series Baseball 2010 was met with mixed results following its release. GameSpot's Brett Todd gave the game a 5.5 (mediocre) score, claiming "With more finesse and depth, Little League World Series Baseball 2010 could have been a contender."
