= Pitfall: The Lost Expedition =

2004 video game

- North American PlayStation 2 cover art
- Developers: Edge of Reality; Torus Games (GBA); Beenox (PC)
- Publishers: Activision (Note: Wii version released under the Fun4All brand in Europe); Aspyr (PC)
- Directors: Richard Ham; Dee Brown, Kelly Bates (PC)
- Producers: Mike Bespeck; Scott Barnes
- Designers: Richard Ham; Tyler Schmitt (PC)
- Programmers: Mike Panoff; Sylvain Morel & Gérard Bélair (PC)
- Artists: Alan D. Johnson; Jason Moulton
- Writer: David Freeman
- Composers: Kevin Manthei; Kevin Riepl
- Series: Pitfall!
- Engine: Havok
- Platforms: GameCube; PlayStation 2 Xbox; Game Boy Advance; Microsoft Windows; Wii
- Release: GCN, Xbox, GBA, PS2: NA: February 17, 2004; EU: February 20, 2004; AU: February 23, 2004; Windows: NA: October 11, 2004; PAL: 2004; Wii: NA: October 7, 2008; EU: February 13, 2009; AU: March 4, 2009
- Genres: Action, platform
- Mode: Single-player

Pitfall: The Lost Expedition is an action-adventure video game developed by Edge of Reality and published by Activision. Part of the Pitfall! series, it was released for the GameCube, PlayStation 2 and Xbox in 2004. An abridged version for the Game Boy Advance by Torus Games was released alongside the console versions. A Windows version developed by Beenox was released later that year. The game was also released on October 7, 2008 on the Wii as Pitfall: The Big Adventure, with it being released under the brand Fun4All in Europe. It was followed in 2012 by Pitfall! for mobile devices.

== Plot ==
In 1935, Pitfall Harry, the fearless, rough-and-ready treasure hunter from the Pitfall! series, returns to help a beautiful archaeologist rescue her father and thwart the evil Jonathan St. Claire from claiming the lost city of El Dorado. As Harry, players encounter various animal enemies, including scorpions, bats, piranhas, crocodiles and penguins, as well as human adversaries under the leadership of the sinister St. Claire. Numerous abilities are at the player's disposal as Harry recovers pages of the Heroic Handbook. With his various items, Harry is equipped for almost anything. Harry will also find lost explorers and be rewarded with golden idols for his trouble, which he can then use as currency with the Shaman.

== Mobile versions ==
Also released at this time were three mobile versions of the game: Pitfall: The Lost Expedition Caves, Pitfall: The Lost Expedition Glacier, and Pitfall: The Lost Expedition Jungle.

== Reception ==
Reception

Aggregate score
Aggregator	Score
Metacritic	(Xbox) 73/100 (GC) 73/100 (PS2) 70/100 (GBA) 66/100 (PC) 66/100

Review scores
Publication	Score
Edge	6/10
Electronic Gaming Monthly	5.67/10
Game Informer	6/10
GamePro	4.5/5
GameRevolution	C+
GameSpot	(Xbox) 7.3/10; 7.1/10 (PC) 7/10
GameSpy	4/5 (GBA) 2/5
GameZone	8/10 (Xbox) 7.1/10 (GBA) 6.5/10
IGN	7.8/10 (GBA) 7/10
Nintendo Power	(GC) 4/5 (GBA) 3.7/5
Official U.S. PlayStation Magazine	2/5
Official Xbox Magazine (US)	7.8/10
PC Gamer (US)	76%
Playboy	83%

Pitfall: The Lost Expedition received "mixed or average" reviews from critics, according to the review aggregation website Metacritic.

GameSpot gave the GameCube and PlayStation 2 versions a 7.3 out of 10 and wrote, "If you're on the lookout for a solid platformer for a weekend rental, then Pitfall: The Lost Expedition is right up your alley." IGN gave the game a 7.8 out of 10, writing, "Activision delivers a worthy sequel to its classic adventure-platformer franchise."

GamePro gave the game a 4.5 out of 5 stars and said, "You don't have to be old school to enjoy Pitfall: The Lost Expedition, but you do have to be prepared to exercise your mind as well as your thumbs. Take a hike with Pitfall Harry, and you'll discover a treasure of a game." Game Informer however, gave the game a 6 out of 10 and wrote, "finely tuned gameplay and well-designed levels. Unfortunately, Pitfall Harry fails on both those counts."
