= D-Pad Hero =

2009 video game

- Title screen for the original D-Pad Hero
- Developers: Kent Hansen, Andreas Pedersen
- Platform: Nintendo Entertainment System
- Release: WW: 2009
- Modes: single player, multiplayer

D-Pad Hero is a 2009 video game demake of the Guitar Hero series developed for the Nintendo Entertainment System. An unofficial release, the game is a ROM which must be dumped onto a cartridge or played via emulator. A sequel, D-Pad Hero 2, was released in 2010.

== Gameplay ==
In D-Pad Hero player use buttons on the controller to hit falling notes in sync with music.

D-Pad Hero is played as a rhythm game. Notes fall from the top to the bottom of the screen in sync with music. As they reach a threshold players hit buttons on the controller which correspond with the note. If the player hits the correct button sequence at the right moment the guitar track in the song will continue to play. If the note is missed the guitar track will silence until the player successfully hits a note. This is similar to the Guitar Hero and Rock Band video game series, in which notes appear on a virtual highway which progressively moves lower onto the screen.

The games feature chiptune versions of popular rock songs such as Guns N' Roses' "Sweet Child o' Mine", Michael Jackson's "The Way You Make Me Feel", Megadeth's "Countdown to Extinction", and Elvis Presley's "Burning Love". Wired.com's Chris Kohler noted that the game's learning curve is quite steep, and that upon its release it better served as "more of a curiosity." The game also features a listen mode which allows players to listen to the song and watch the notes progress without playing.

== Reception ==
The game received coverage from media outlets. 1UP.com listed it in their 31 Homebrew Games You Must Play feature, and called the game "punishingly hard." In 2009 it was featured in the German magazine Games, Entertainment, Education. Both games were featured again on 1UP.com, who called the sequel "twice as hard".
