= Fun4All =

2009 Activision brand of video games

The Fun4All-brand by Activision is usually displayed on the upper-left corner of the Wii box.

Fun4All is a brand made by Activision for their line of family-friendly video games for the Wii. The brand launched in Europe on February 13, 2009, and is exclusive to PAL territories. Activision planned to launch a similar brand in North America called "Wee 1st", but decided later to name it "Designed Exclusively for Wii". There are currently six titles that are a part of the Fun4All-brand.

== Games ==
Fun4All games consist of Monkey Mischief! Party Time, Little League World Series Baseball 2008, Pitfall: The Big Adventure, Block Party, Pirates: Hunt for Blackbeard's Booty and World Championship Sports (Big League Sports). Games branded "Designed Exclusively for Wii" are Monkey Mischief, Block Party, and Pirates: Hunt for Blackbeard's Booty.

=== Big League Sports ===
Big League Sports, known in PAL territories as World Championship Sports, is a sports video game published by Activision. It was developed by Koolhaus Games, who also developed the iPad version of Madden NFL 11. It was released on November 11, 2008, in North America and on February 13, 2009, in Europe.

Big League Sports features the sports of tennis, basketball, football, soccer, lacrosse and hockey. The focus is not on the team, but on performance in specific, intense play moments. Big League Sports includes a total of 22 events. The game supports up to 4-player local multi-player. A character creation feature allows players to craft a character using dozens of customization options. Players can view their statistics and overall progress, as well as the trophies they have won.

=== Block Party ===
Block Party is a party video game developed by Ivolgamus and published by Activision. It was released on November 11, 2008, in North America and on February 13, 2009, in Europe. Block Party contains 20 different mini-games. The goal of the game is to wreak havoc throughout the neighborhood and be named the Best on the Block. The game features a number of different sorts of neighborhood games, such as Super-Sack Race, Backyard Juggling, Trampoline Tricks and Lawn Bowlin'. Block Party features three different modes: Story Mode for single-player, Quick Play mode for multiplayer and Tournament mode for "the ultimate multiplayer experience".

=== Little League World Series Baseball 2008 ===
Little League World Series Baseball 2008 is a video game released on August 5, 2008, for the Wii and the Nintendo DS by Activision. It is the first video game to be officially licensed by Little League baseball. Its design mirrors MLB Power Pros and its sequel MLB Power Pros 2008. The gameplay is also similar to the baseball game in Wii Sports.

The game has modes including World Series mode, exhibition mode and mini-games. In World Series mode, a player chooses one of the 16 different regions and tries to reach the Little League World Series by making it through pool play, then winning in the playoffs. In the Exhibition mode, a player can pit any two teams in the game against each other for a faster, less-complicated experience.

The game has an extensive array of minigames called "Skill Challenges", which range from the power-hitting home run tourney to tic-tac-toe.

=== Monkey Mischief! Party Time ===
Monkey Mischief! Party Time, known in PAL territories as Monkey Mischief!, is a party video game developed by the Lithuanian video game developer, Ivolgamus, and published by Activision. It was released on November 11, 2008, in North America and on February 13, 2009, in Europe. Set at a local zoo that has been shut down for the night, Monkey Mischief revolves around a group of troublesome monkeys, who have escaped and are determined to cause havoc on the other animals in the zoo.

In Monkey Mischief! Party Time, the goal of the game is to cause as much mischief as possible by playing comical mini-games. The game contains 20 different mini-games. Players can choose between four different monkeys who have their own individual humor and physical characteristics, such as haircut, color, height and more.

The game feature both single-player and multiplayer modes of play. In single-player mode, the player chooses one of the four different monkeys to play as through 20 mini-games. Playing these mini-games unlocks them for multi-player use supporting up to four players. In multi-player, each player is one of the four different monkeys.

== Reception ==
Aggregate review scores
Game	GameRankings	Metacritic
Little League World Series Baseball 2008	71.37%	70/100
Pitfall: The Big Adventure	56.00%	—
Pirates: Hunt for Blackbeard's Booty	40.00%	—
Big League Sports	28.00%	—
Block Party	33.00%	—
Monkey Mischief! Party Time	40.00%	—

Most of the Fun4All-titles received generally unfavorable reviews. Only two of the games received mixed to generally favorable reviews. According to GameRankings, the best game under the brand is Little League World Series Baseball 2008 with an average score of 71,37%. Kotaku was very negative towards the brand after the initial announcement.

Monkey Mischief! Party Time received mostly unfavorable reviews. The game was criticized for its lack of creativity, polish and lack of fun. Most reviewers also noted that the game had unbearable long and irritating loading screens. Adam Ballard from IGN said in his review that the game was "just another member of the long line of mini-game garbage titles put out for the Wii" and that the load screens in Monkey Mischief! Party Time are more annoying than the dog in Duck Hunt. Derek from Classic Game Room said that the game was "a low-budget, half-baked slice of unoriginal Wii development at its worst". He also claimed it to be identical to Block Party, a game developed and published by the same company.

Big League Sports received generally unfavorable reviews after its launch. Many reviewers criticised the game for its lack of variety and overall lack of polish, good ideas and controls. IGN's Aaron Thornton said in his review that most games revolve around players flailing their arms around constantly. He also noted that most of the games felt similar and criticized the lack of variety. GameChronicles.com said in their review that Big League Sports is "a miserable game that should rather be released as a $10 WiiWare game" and that the game should be avoided at all costs.
