= Pitfall: The Mayan Adventure =

1994 video game

- North American Genesis box art by Nadia Staroselska
- Developer: Activision (Note: Animation work by Kroyer Films) (Note: Ported to Super NES by Redline Games, to Windows by Kinesoft, to 32X by Big Bang Software in partnership with Zombie Virtual Reality Entertainment, to Atari Jaguar by Imagitec Design, and to Game Boy Advance by Pipe Dream Interactive)
- Publishers: Activision; NA: Majesco (GBA); EU: THQ (GBA)
- Director: Bill Kroyer
- Producers: Denise Roberts McKee; John Spinale; Nathalie Deschartes
- Designer: John Spinale
- Programmer: George Allan
- Artist: Karen Johnson
- Writer: Veronica Milito
- Composer: Soundelux Media Labs
- Series: Pitfall
- Platforms: Genesis, Super NES, Microsoft Windows, Sega CD, 32X, Atari Jaguar, Game Boy Advance
- Release: November 1994: Genesis, SNES; NA: November 1994; UK: December 1994 Sega CD; EU: December 1994; NA: January 1995 Windows; WW: August 24, 1995 Jaguar; NA: October 17, 1995 32X; NA: October 1995 Game Boy Advance; NA: June 11, 2001; EU: September 21, 2001
- Genres: Action, platform
- Mode: Single-player

Pitfall: The Mayan Adventure (Note: Also known as Pitfall: The Great Mayan Adventure (Japanese: ピットフォール: マヤの大冒険, Hepburn: Pitfall: Maya no Daibōken) in Japan on the Super Famicom) is a 1994 action-platform video game developed by Activision in conjunction with Kroyer Films. The fourth installment in the Pitfall! franchise, players assume the role of Pitfall Harry Jr. as he embarks on a journey through the Mayan jungles of Central America in an attempt to rescue Pitfall Harry, his father and the protagonist of previous entries in the series, from the evil Mayan warrior spirit Zakelua. Its gameplay mainly consists of action and platforming mixed with stage-based exploration using a main six-button configuration.

Pitfall: The Mayan Adventure began its development on the Super Nintendo Entertainment System and formed part in a string of planned franchise revivals by Activision along with other games from the Atari 2600 such as Kaboom! and River Raid. It featured sprite-based visuals before Kroyer Films was brought to assist in its creation by providing hand-drawn animations and graphics instead, while the lead platform transitioned from the Super NES to Sega Genesis. The Genesis and Super NES versions were both released during the 1994 holiday shopping season, and ports for the 32X, Atari Jaguar, PC, and Sega CD followed in 1995, with each one being developed by third-party developers and featuring several changes and additions compared to the original version. Years later it was re-released through download services such as Virtual Console and given a portable release on the Game Boy Advance.

Pitfall: The Mayan Adventure was met with mostly positive responses from critics who praised the presentation, visuals, and sound design, but criticized the inability to control the character during certain animations.

== Gameplay ==
Genesis version screenshot

Pitfall: The Mayan Adventure is a side-scrolling action-platform game similar to Disney's Aladdin and The Lion King where the player takes control of Pitfall Harry Junior across the Mayan jungles of Central America to defeat the evil Mayan warrior spirit Zakelua and rescue his father from captivity. Prior to starting a new playthrough, players have the choice to change various settings at the options screen such as controls and difficulty.

Most of the early stages featured in the game are large, linear in nature, and populated with obstacles, enemies and environmental hazards, requiring the player to traverse the stage by running, jumping, climbing, swinging, shooting, or dodging enemies. Other areas that are featured later are more maze-like and exploratory, making the player take different routes to reach the end. On certain stages, a boss must be fought in order to progress further. All stages contain beneficial items, weapon ammunition to be collected, hidden letters that spell the word "Pitfall", and other secrets. If Harry Jr. is killed, he respawns on the nearest checkpoint reached, but once all lives are lost, the game is over, though players have the option of resuming progress by either using continues or loading their saved game into the last stage reached (depending on the version that is being played), which also keeps the number of lives and items collected through.

The player character can move in four directions. Harry Jr. can fight enemies with his whip or shoot sling stones, boomerangs, and explosives. Charging a sling stone for a determined time period allows Harry Jr. to perform a powerful shot against enemies. Harry Jr. can also crouch by pressing both down and the jump button, allowing him to traverse enclosed areas.

== Synopsis ==
Pitfall: The Mayan Adventure takes place after the events of Pitfall II: Lost Caverns, where Pitfall Harry had settled down following his days as an adventurer in order to raise his son, Harry Junior, but became a legend among people due to his feats. Inheriting his father's love for exploration, Harry Jr. grew up to become an adventurer and took on many quests on his own, prompting Pitfall Harry to miss his old adventure days. Both Harry and Harry Jr. embarked on a journey towards the jungles of Central America to find lost Mayan treasures. After several days, both Harry and Harry Jr. have reached the center of the Mayan empire, hoping to uncover the treasure of Uaxactun. However, as soon as Harry Jr. uncovers the relic, his father is captured by an evil Mayan warrior spirit named Zakelua, leading Harry Jr. to rescue his father from captivity.

== Production ==
=== Background ===
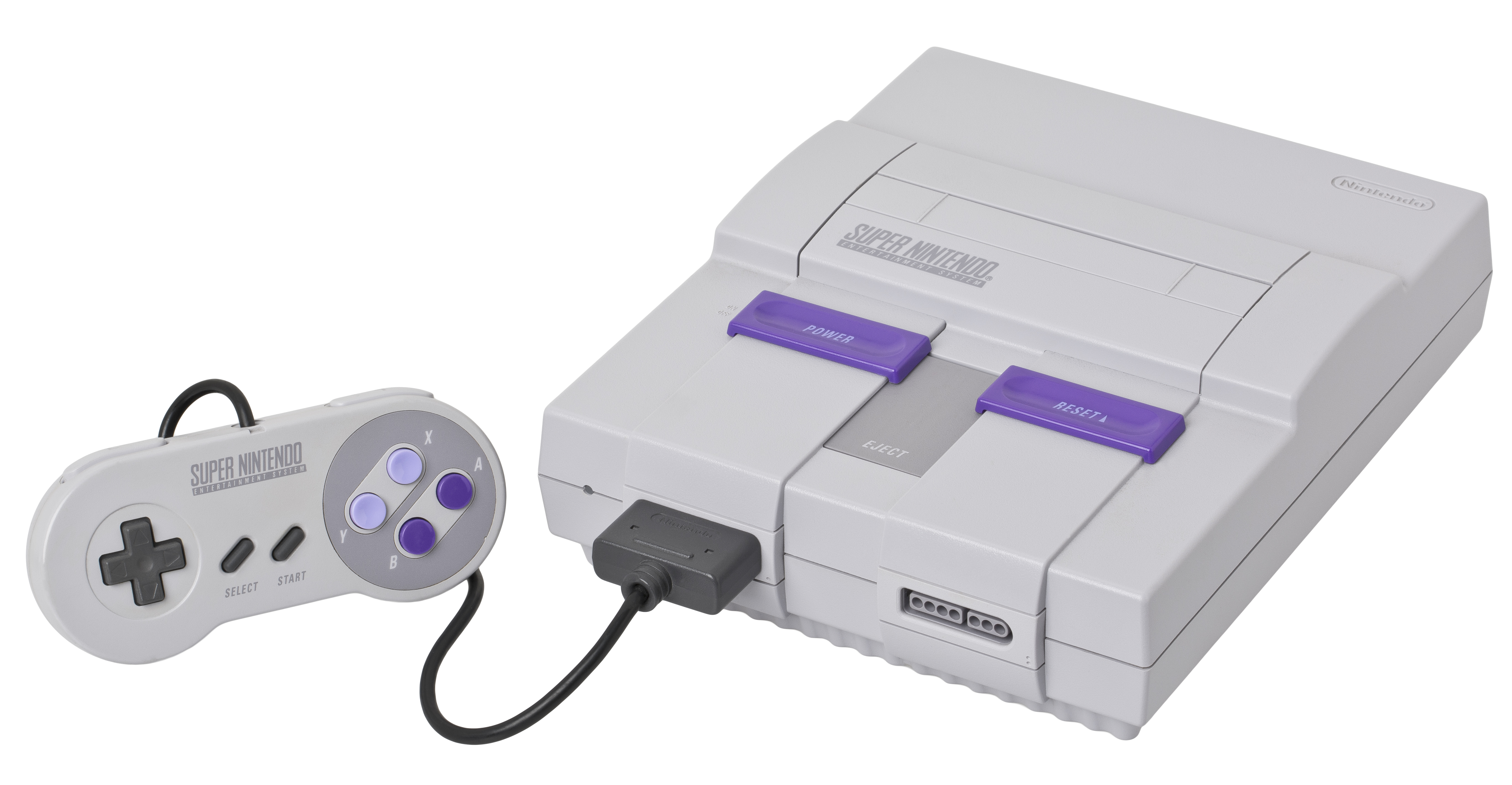
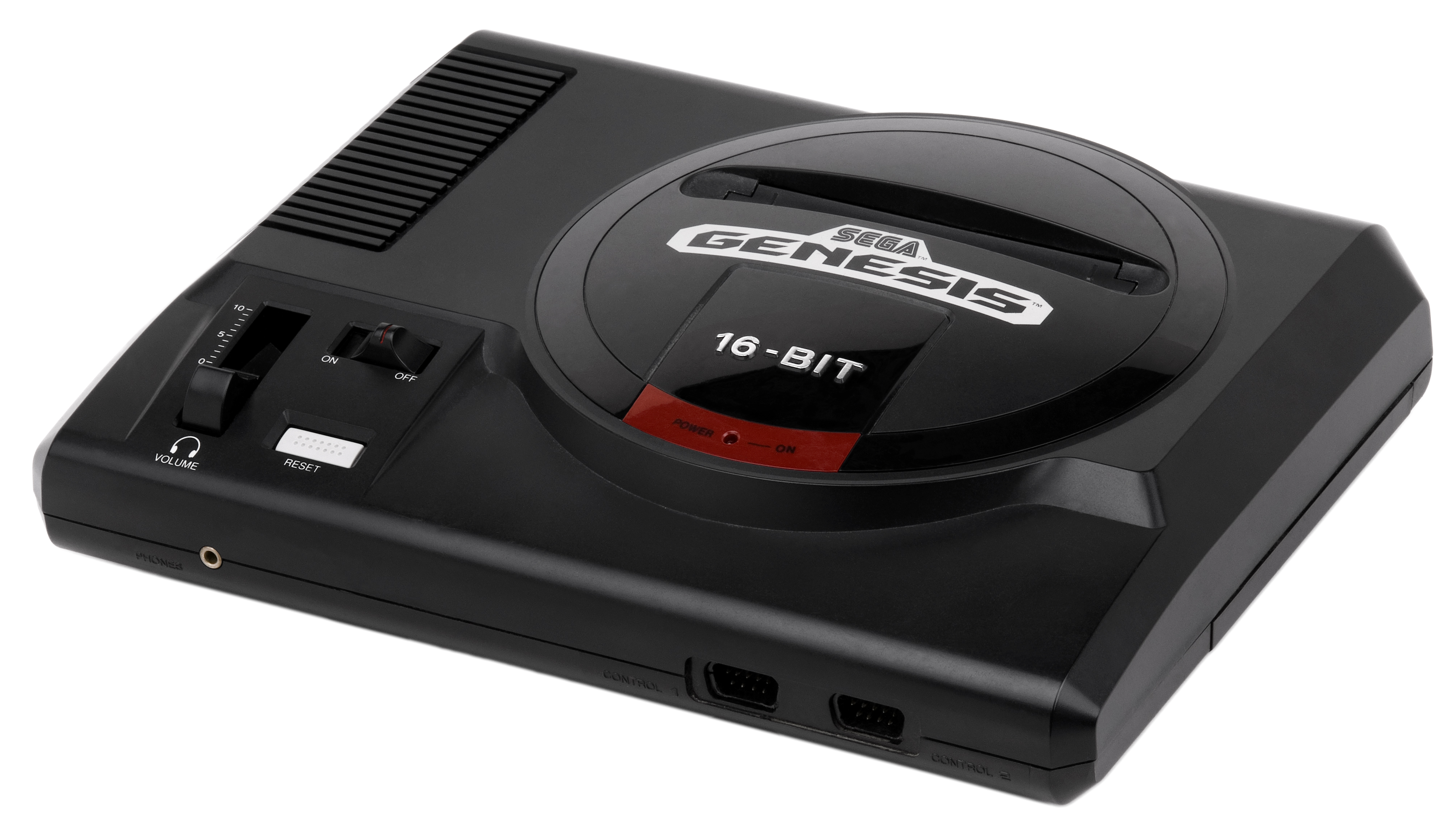
Pitfall: The Mayan Adventure initially featured a different visual style and was being developed for the Super NES before transitioning to the Genesis with a new visual approach.

Pitfall: The Mayan Adventure was initially in development for the Super NES under the title Pitfall Harry: The Mayan Adventure and formed part of a string of franchise revivals by Activision along with other games from the Atari 2600 such as Kaboom! and River Raid. The three titles were showcased at Summer Consumer Electronics Show in 1993 featuring sprite-based visuals, with early promotional materials and previews for Pitfall Harry touting several features not found in the final release such as underwater and flying sections, as well as 32 stages.

Despite Pitfall being slated for a Winter 1993 launch, the three titles were delayed to 1994; Kaboom! and River Raid were eventually cancelled for unknown reasons, while the former remained in full development. Kroyer Films, an animation studio which worked on several projects like FernGully: The Last Rainforest (1992), was later brought to assist in the creation of Pitfall: The Mayan Adventure by providing hand-drawn animations and graphics. The game was showcased at Summer CES 1994, now under its final name and sporting hand-drawn visuals by Kroyer Films, while the lead platform transitioned from the Super NES to the Sega Genesis.

=== Development ===
==== Animation ====
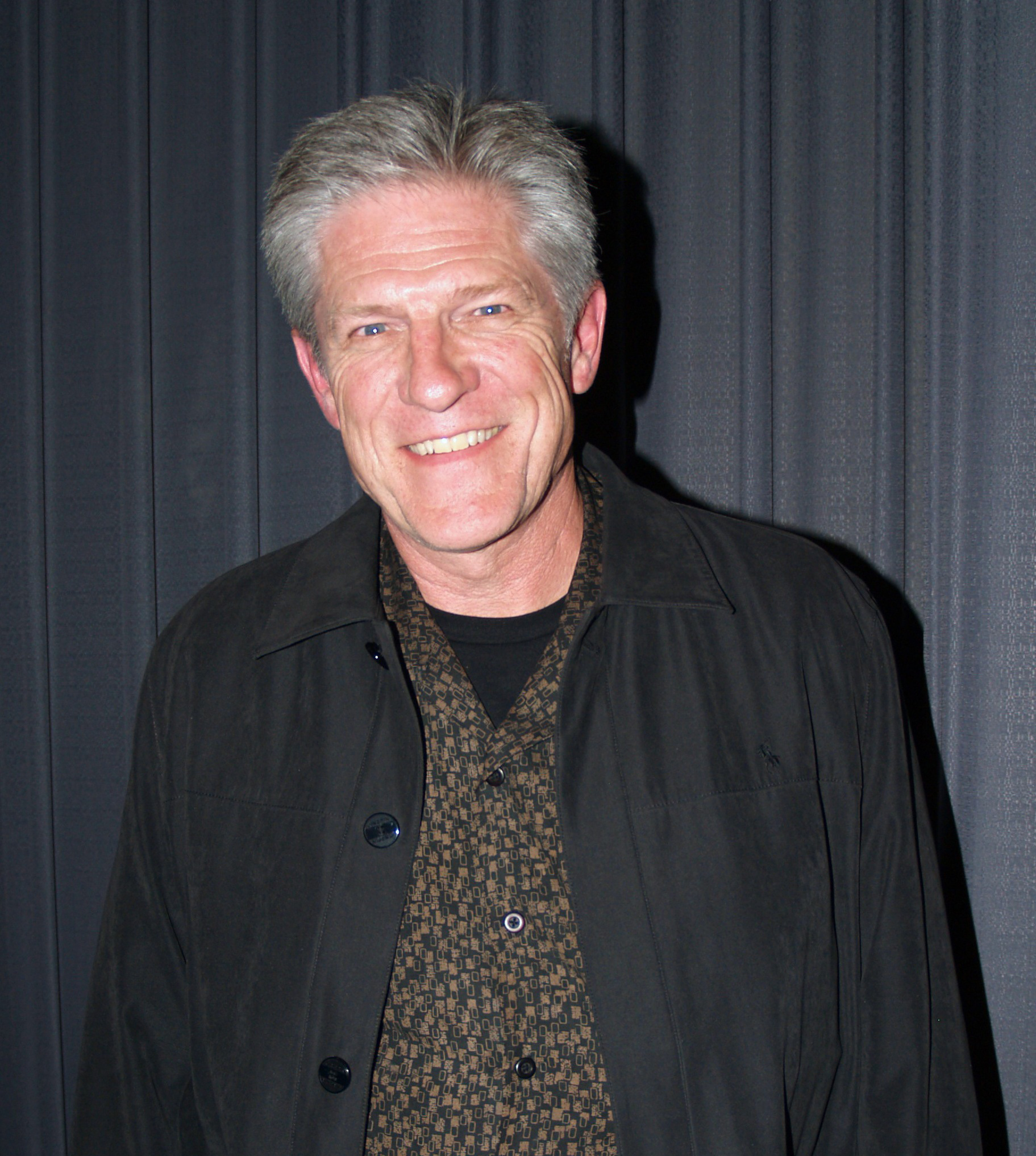
Bill Kroyer and his studio were brought to assist in the development of Pitfall: The Mayan Adventure alongside Activision.

Bill Kroyer and his studio were approached by Activision CEO Bobby Kotick and his partner Howard Marks to produce animation work for Pitfall: The Mayan Adventure after seeing their previous endeavors, as Kotick wanted high-quality animation for the Pitfall project. Although they were seeking multiple studios to be on board, the company settled with Kroyer Films due to its being the only company which hosted ex-Disney animators and was capable of matching Disney's level of quality.

Activision provided several production materials such as concept art, layouts and storyboards to Kroyer Films in order to define how the main character should traverse the constrained levels, while animation required to be consistent in terms of size. Kroyer and his company interacted several times with the programming team at Activision, who explained to them how the process would work and later transposed the hand-drawn sketches lent by the studio into pixel art graphics. Kroyer stated that the project proved to be both different and challenging for his team, as the studio needed to draw a high number of actions and poses for the characters to perform in-game seamlessly with multiple frames of animation in order for players to not feel taken out from the experience, instead of scripted sequences as seen with their animated feature films.

During a meeting with Activision's creative team to showcase test animation and how the process went, a female worker told Kroyer that his team should make the main character younger. Once their task was completed, Kroyer Films was no longer involved with the project, which served as their only involvement with video games. Though Disney's Aladdin was released a year earlier for the Genesis in 1993, Kroyer claimed that neither he and his team were aware of its existence.

==== Audio ====
Both the music and sound effects were created by Soundelux Media Labs, who would later collaborate with Activision on MechWarrior 2: 31st Century Combat (1995).

== Release ==
Pitfall: The Mayan Adventure was first released for the Genesis by Activision in North America in November 1994, and in Europe in December 1994. It was also released in Japan exclusively via the Sega Channel service in June 1995. The Genesis version has a critical bug if the player goes to the options menu and changes the control scheme, when the player reaches the "Runaway Minecar" stage while using the altered control scheme, the player would get stuck standing beside the mine cart and would not be able to progress any further in the game, using the default controls is mandatory if a player wishes to complete the game. The Genesis version has since been re-released through the Wii's Virtual Console on 13 April 2009 in North America, then in PAL regions on 15 May 2009 and in Japan on 25 August 2009. The Virtual Console re-release was delisted on 26 December 2013 in Japan and at the end of 2013 in North America and PAL regions. The game has been ported to various platforms, with each port featuring several changes and additions. An extra feature in all versions is the ability to play the original Atari 2600 version of Pitfall!, which is done by finding a secret doorway within the fourth stage.

The game had a marketing budget of at least $6 million.

=== Ports ===
The Sega CD version was released in Europe around the same time period as the Genesis original, followed by North America in January 1995. It shares the same visual design as the Genesis release but contains extra (and expanded) levels, Redbook CD Audio for an arranged soundtrack, an introductory full motion video sequence, and other enhancements. The Super NES port was handled by Redline Games with additional assistance from Cygnus Software and, like the previous two versions, it was published in North America by Activision in November 1994, then in Europe on December of the same year and in Japan by Pony Canyon on 14 July 1995. The Super NES port runs at a lower resolution than both the Genesis and Sega CD versions, and has changes to the foreground and backgrounds in some stages, but features a higher color palette and special effects not found in the Sega versions, besides other alterations.

Windows 95 version screenshot

The Windows 95 port was made by Kinesoft using their Exodus game technology, which was later reused to make the Windows port of Earthworm Jim: Special Edition. It was published by Activision in August 1995, becoming the first commercial release for the then-recently debuted Windows 95 operating system. Developed over the course of eight months and based on the Sega 32X port, this version of the game features redrawn visuals displayed at an 8-bit color art, in-game CD audio and sound effects by Soundelux Media, as well as the extra levels from the Sega CD version. The SoftKey version included both America Online's free trial software for Windows 3.1/95, Internet Explorer 3.02 and a Cyber Patrol demo for Windows 3.1/95. This version was also published in Japan by GameBank. The Windows 95 port was showcased by Bill Gates at E3 1995 to promote the then-upcoming DirectX for his platform, despite the conversion being launched three months before the first incarnation of DirectX and Kinesoft not using any tools from said technology.

The 32X conversion was co-developed by Big Bang Software alongside Zombie Virtual Reality Entertainment and published by Activision exclusively in North America in October 1995. Based on the original Genesis release, the 32X version shares the same visual design as the Windows 95 release and features the additional levels from the Sega CD version, but runs at 30 frames per second instead of 60 frames, suffering a great amount of slowdown. The Atari Jaguar port was created by Imagitec Design and published by Atari Corporation in North America and Europe on 18 October 1995. It shares the same visuals as both the Windows 95 and 32X versions, though it contains changes in certain stages and a rearranged soundtrack and runs at 30 frames per second.

Pitfall: The Mayan Adventure received a handheld conversion by Pipedream Interactive for the Game Boy Advance. It was first published by Majesco in North America on 11 June 2001 and later in Europe by THQ on 21 September of the same year, becoming the last version of the game to be officially released. Based on the Super NES version, the Game Boy Advance port alters the visuals and contains audio issues. Versions for the 3DO Interactive Multiplayer, Amiga CD32, PlayStation, Sega Saturn and Nuon were announced but never released.

== Reception ==
Reception

Aggregate score
Aggregator	Score
GameRankings	53% (GBA)

Review scores
Publication	Score
Aktueller Software Markt	11/12 (GEN, SNES)
Computer Game Review	249/300 (WIN)
Computer Gaming World	4/5 (WIN)
Computer and Video Games	91/100 (GEN); 92/100 (SNES); 66/100 (JAG)
Electronic Gaming Monthly	7/10 (GEN); 8/10, 8/10, 7/10, 7/10, 8/10 (SCD); 7.8/10 (SNES); 6.625/10
EP Daily	8.5/10 (JAG); 5.5/10 (GBA)
Eurogamer	5/10 (GBA)
Famitsu	8/10, 8/10, 6/10, 8/10 (SNES)
GameFan	267/300 (GEN); 212/300 (32X)
GameSpot	4.3/10 (GBA)
IGN	5.0/10 (GEN, 32X, GBA)
Mean Machines Sega	89/100 (GEN)
Next Generation	2/5 (SNES); 3/5 (SCD, WIN, 32X); 4/5 (JAG); 2/5 (GBA)
PC Games (DE)	90% (WIN)
ST Format	80% (JAG)
VideoGames & Computer Entertainment	9/10 (GEN, SNES)
Entertainment Weekly	B+ (SNES)

Awards
Publication	Award
VideoGames (1994)	Best Music (CD)
Power Play (1995)	Best Dexterity Game in 1995

Pitfall: The Mayan Adventure sold in excess of one million copies by June 1996.

Reviewing the Genesis version, GamePro criticized the lag in the controls, elaborating that "the split-second lag time between his jump and your ability to control his movements again is the difference between a narrow escape and losing a life. The same problem occurs whenever he changes direction - he pauses, you can't control him, and Harry Jr. takes a hit." However, they praised the graphics, the intense action, the music, and the inclusion of the original Pitfall!, and gave the game an overall recommendation, particularly for hardcore platforming gamers.

GamePro applauded the Super NES version as having "some of the best character animations ever seen in an SNES game." They also praised the distinctive enemies, realistic sound effects, and entertaining challenge. Next Generation reviewed the Super NES version of the game, and stated that "Run of the mill graphics and sound combined with gameplay that is, at best, tedious and uninspired, leave Pitfall interesting as a novelty, but not much else." Entertainment Weekly wrote that Pitfall: The Mayan Adventure was successful "mainly because the original Pitfall — a straightforward action game in which a stick-figure hero runs, jumps, and climbs up and down ladders — is far more adaptable to today's 16-bit technology. In fact, this version plays like Indiana Jones in fast-forward, as Pitfall Harry Jr. executes his derring-do amid lush jungle backgrounds, stirring music, and pumped-up sound effects."

GamePro gave the Sega CD version a positive review as well. They remarked that the new levels, full motion video sequences, and improved graphics all add to the game, which they noted has the same high challenge, realistic sound effects, and difficult controls as in previous versions. Mike Weigand of Electronic Gaming Monthly commented of the Sega CD version that "Huge levels, excellent animations and nice sound effects make this one an action/adventure winner." In contrast, Next Generation ridiculed the additions to the Sega CD version as unimportant. They concluded that "The game is not bad, just not great."

Next Generation, while noting that the game is "a somewhat hit-and-miss side-scroller that has some cool features", judged the Windows port to be an "excellent" conversion which would satisfy gamers who wanted to play Pitfall: The Mayan Adventure but did not own a console system.

Nintendo Power complimented the good balance between action and puzzle-oriented gameplay and excellent graphics and sound. Their review said the game has poor hit detection which made fighting and collecting items difficult in some areas.

Reviewing the 32X version, the four reviewers of Electronic Gaming Monthly praised the large number of secrets but criticized the difficult controls and the lack of significant improvement from the Genesis version. GamePro dismissed the 32X version for this same reason, summarizing that "nothing has changed in this latest version of Pitfall." Next Generation concurred that the 32X version's improvements are too minor for the average player to even notice, and again opined that the game is "solid" but "average".

GamePro called the Jaguar version "a fun, colorful action adventure". However, they commented that it is identical to the Genesis and Super NES versions and inferior to the Sega CD version (due to the lack of the "densely layered" sound effects and orchestrated music), which they found disappointing given that the Jaguar is a more powerful system and at this point most people interested in the game would have already played it on another platform. Next Generation agreed the Jaguar version is essentially the same as previous releases of the game but gave it a more positive assessment than previous reviews in the magazine, concluding that it "maintains a feeling of quality game design from the very beginning, and is well worth checking out, especially if you're an old-school Pitfall fan."

In 1995, Total! ranked the game 48th on its Top 100 SNES Games summarizing: "It's a sort of Indiana Jones type of thing and plays like a dream. And for nostalgia freaks it contains a complete and accurate version of the old Atari classic."

Next Generation reviewed the Game Boy Advance version of the game, rating it two stars out of five, and stated that "This isn't terrible, but there are plenty of better-playing alternatives."
