= Super Pitfall =

1986 video game

- NES box art
- Developer: Micronics (NES)
- Publishers: JP: Pony Inc.; NA: Activision
- Programmers: Color Computer 3 Steve Bjork; PC-88; Makoto Ichinoseki
- Platforms: Nintendo Entertainment System, PC-88, Color Computer 3
- Release: NES: JP: September 5, 1986; NA: November 1987
- Genre: Platform
- Modes: Single-player, multiplayer

Super Pitfall (Note: Japanese: スーパーピットフォール, Hepburn: Sūpā Pittofōru) is a 1986 side-scrolling non-linear platform game for the Nintendo Entertainment System (NES). Despite the title screen stating that it was reprogrammed by Pony Inc., the development of the NES version was handled by Micronics, a Japanese developer who mostly ported arcade games to the NES.

Super Pitfall was the first game that Activision published as a third-party developer for the NES. Following the original release of the game, ports were made in Japan by Makoto Ichinoseki for the PC-8800 series line of computers and by Steve Bjork for the Color Computer 3. The game initially received positive reviews from VideoGames & Computer Entertainment and Computer Entertainer while Bill Kunkel wrote in Computer Gaming World that the game did not control well and did not stand out well in a market of Super Mario Bros. clones. Retrospective reviews of the NES game from game critic Brett Weiss and Stuart Hunt of Retro Gamer found the game a step down from the previous Pitfall games on the Atari 2600, with both faulting low quality graphics and game design.

Activision initially was going to distribute Sunsoft's Atlantis no Nazo in the United States in a rebranded form as a sequel to Super Pitfall, however, this release did not happen.

== Gameplay ==
Pitfall Harry in an early scene in the game with an enemy frog

The game features Pitfall Harry as the player character. Equipped with a gun, he seeks to recover the Raj diamond from a vast subterranean dwelling in the Andes Mountains and rescue his niece Rhonda and cat friend Quickclaw the Lion who are trapped deep in the caverns. The goal is to move Harry through a nonlinear cave maze finding the two trapped friends and collect the Raj diamond and return to the starting point. While playing, Harry will find that Rhonda has turned to stone and Quickclaw is trapped and both require items to be freed. To return home, Harry must collect a photograph of the Underground Kingdom for a clue on how to return entrance. Harry begins with three lives and on touching an enemy or a hazard he loses one. Lives can be earned from collecting 50,000 points, and then 80,000 the next. Points are collecting by shooting and defeating enemies and collecting gold bars and other items.

Harry is maneuvered with the directional pad to move left and right and can climb and swim upwards with the up arrow. He can jump and fire his gun with the A and B buttons respectively. Harry can collect items shaped like playing card suits to open rock doors as well as spare pistols and items that make him invulnerable to enemies. Items in the game are invisible and can only be grabbed at certain moments while jumping.

== Development ==
Super Pitfall was developed by the Japanese company Micronics. Micronics predominantly did work in outsourcing tasks and generally made Nintendo Entertainment System (NES) versions of popular arcade titles such as Ikari Warriors (1986) and 1942 (1984). Stuart Hunt of Retro Gamer described the game as a loose port of the Atari 2600 game Pitfall II: Lost Caverns (1984).

In Japan, the game was released for the PC-8801MKIISR model in the PC-8800 series of home computers. It was designed by Makoto Ichinoseki. Steve and Monique Bjork contributed to the Color Computer 3 (CoCo 3) port of Super Pitfall. Steven had written the code for it and over 20 Tandy and Color Computer programs, while Monique contributed to the graphics in the game. The CoCo 3 version, three difficulty options are made available, in expert mode: the items Harry seeks are invisible while in explorer mode Harry has unlimited lives and treasures remain visible.

== Release ==
Super Pitfall was released in Japan for the Family Computer on September 5, 1986. Super Pitfall was the first game published by Activision that was released on the NES. It was released in the United States for the NES in November 1987. It was later released for the Color Computer 3 and required 512K of memory to operate.

Activision was going to release Sunsoft's Atlantis no Nazo (1986) rebranded as a sequel to Super Pitfall, but never received a release in the United States. A fan remake of Super Pitfall by Nesrocks was released in 2016. The new version of the game changing the visuals, redesigning levels and a new score.

== Reception ==
Reception

Review scores
Publication	Score
Beep	3/5
Famicom Hisshoubon	2.5/5, 3/5, 3/5 (Note: Each of the three reviewers in Famicom Hisshoubon ranked the game on a 5 point scale)

A reviewer in the Japanese video game magazine Beep described the game as average with some obvious flaws such as slower screen transitions.

Reviews in Famicom Hisshoubon and Computer Entertainer complimented on the large scale of the game. All three reviewers in Famicom Hisshoubon complimented on the large scale of the maze, with one suggesting it would have been better with a focus on the maze exploration. A review in Computer Entertainer found the game gave players plenty to explore, specifically noting large amount of secret areas and hidden objects and recommended it to fans of the two previous Pitfall games on the Atari 2600. VideoGames & Computer Entertainment the game to be a "higher quality" form than previous entries in the Pitfall series.

Both Bill Kunkel of Computer Gaming World and one reviewer in Famicom Hisshoubon found the playing character's movement to be slow, with Kunkel describing it as "floaty". Kunkel continued that the gameplay and visuals were too similar to that Super Mario Bros. (1985) and concluded that "there is nothing in the game itself to keep [NES users] awake." Both VideoGames & Computer Entertainment and a Famicom Hisshoubon reviewer gave negative remarks about the music, with the later publication calling it boring. Tony Olive in The Rainbow reviewed the CoCo port, praising the graphics as arcade-quality, with smooth movement, and finding the game to be fun and challenging.

From retrospective reviews, Stuart Hunt wrote in Retro Gamer that the game was derided by most fans of the Pitfall series, with Brett Weiss, author of Classic Home Video Games, 1985-1988 (2009), stating it was far inferior to the previous Atari 2600 games in the franchise. Hunt and anonymous reviewer in Eurogamer highlighted poor collision detection and game play that involved, with Hunt finding the weapon in the game to be useless as it passed over most enemies heads. The Eurogamer reviewer derided it for poor hit detection and esoteric puzzles that were deemed "too weird". The reviewer highlighted one having Pitfall Harry jump into a unique enemy in the game to warp to a separate part of a cave. Both Hunt and Eurogamer wrote that there was an overt amount of trial and error gameplay. Weiss described the graphics as awful while Hunt disparaged the flickering sprites and stiff animation. Hunt said Pitfall Harry looked too much like Mario in a safari hat. Weiss went further to say the game had "awful music".
