= Pitfall II: The Lost Caverns =

- European arcade flyer
- Developer: Sega
- Publisher: Sega
- Series: Pitfall
- Platforms: Arcade, SG-1000
- Release: Arcade: JP: February 1985; NA: May 1985; SG-1000: JP: July 1985

Pitfall II: The Lost Caverns is a 1985 arcade video game developed and published by Sega. It is based upon Activision's two home console games Pitfall! (1982) and Pitfall II: Lost Caverns (1984) for the Atari 2600. It has been described by historian Brett Weiss as a "rare occurrence" of an arcade game being influenced by a console game. The game was later ported to the SG-1000 console in Japan.

== Gameplay ==
Pitfall II: The Lost Caverns focuses on Pitfall Harry locating three treasures hidden in large caverns. The player must maneuver the character within a time limit to earn extra points and additional playtime. When Pitfall Harry interacts with a key, a hole opens which allows the player to continue into a new cavern allowing for bonus points and more time allotted on the timer.

== Development and release ==
Sega licensed the Pitfall name from Activision to develop Pitfall II: The Lost Caverns. The arcade combines elements of both Pitfall! and Pitfall II: Lost Caverns as well as introducing unique obstacles such as lightning and volcanic rocks.

Pitfall II: The Lost Caverns was released to Japanese arcades in February 1985. It was released in the United States by Sega USA in May 1985. The game was among Sega USA's earliest releases, which were games that were no longer turning a profit in Japan. It was not a significant hit in Sega USA's market. The game saw a home release on Sega's SG-1000 console in July of that same year in Japan.

== Reception ==
In Japan, Game Machine listed the arcade version of Pitfall II: Lost Caverns as the most successful table arcade unit of February 1985.

From contemporary reviews, Computer and Video Games declared the game to be "as good as, if not better than" the original Atari 2600 games.

From retrospective reviews, Earl Green of AllGame stated that the game boasted more detailed and colorful graphics than either of the Atari 2600 Pitfall games, with enough twists to challenge console veterans.
