= Pitfall II: Lost Caverns =

1984 video game

- Atari 2600 cover art
- Developer: Activision
- Publisher: Activision
- Designer: David Crane
- Series: Pitfall
- Platforms: Atari 2600, Atari 5200, Atari 8-bit, ColecoVision, Commodore 64, IBM PCjr, Apple II, MSX, ZX Spectrum
- Release: February 17, 1984: Atari 2600; February 17, 1984; ColecoVision; October 1984; Atari 5200; November 1984; IBM PCjr; 1984; Apple II; December 1984
- Genre: Platform
- Mode: Single-player

Pitfall II: Lost Caverns is a 1984 platform video game developed by David Crane and published by Activision for the Atari 2600. The player controls Pitfall Harry, who must explore the wilds of Peru to find the Raj diamond and rescue his niece Rhonda and their animal friend Quickclaw. The game world is populated by various enemies and hazards that variously cause the player to lose points and return to a checkpoint.

The game is a sequel to Pitfall! (1982), one of the best-selling Atari 2600 video games. Crane found that the Atari 2600 hardware was out of date when developing the sequel, which led to him creating a custom computer chip called the Display Processor Chip for Pitfall II: Lost Caverns. This allowed for more complex graphics and background music than its predecessor.

Pitfall II received positive reviews for its expanded gameplay, with reviewers finding it superior to Pitfall!. It became the top selling console game of the year and was ported to other consoles and home computers. Retrospective reviews have continued to be positive, with Retro Gamer listing it as the best game on the Atari 2600 and other critics noting its gameplay innovations, such as being among the first games to include a checkpoint system.

== Gameplay ==
Gameplay of Pitfall II. A red cross checkpoint can be seen, as well as Quickclaw, who must be interacted with to win the game.

Pitfall II: Lost Caverns is a platform video game set in Machu Pichu, Peru. The player controls Pitfall Harry, whose goal is to find and rescue Quickclaw the cat as well as Harry's niece Rhonda, and to recover the Raj diamond.

Pitfall Harry moves left and right and can jump over and onto objects, climb up and down ladders, ascend via balloons and swim to seek treasure and achieve the game objectives. The player can additionally collect gold bars scattered throughout the playfield for more points.

Unlike the original Pitfall! video game, there is no swinging on vines and there are no timed levels. There is also no "classical" approach to the number of player lives Pitfall Harry has; accidentally falling or interacting with traps and enemies merely causes the player's score to diminish. The player can find red crosses across the ground that act as checkpoints; when the player is hit by an enemy, Pitfall Harry returns to the last checkpoint he located.

== Development ==
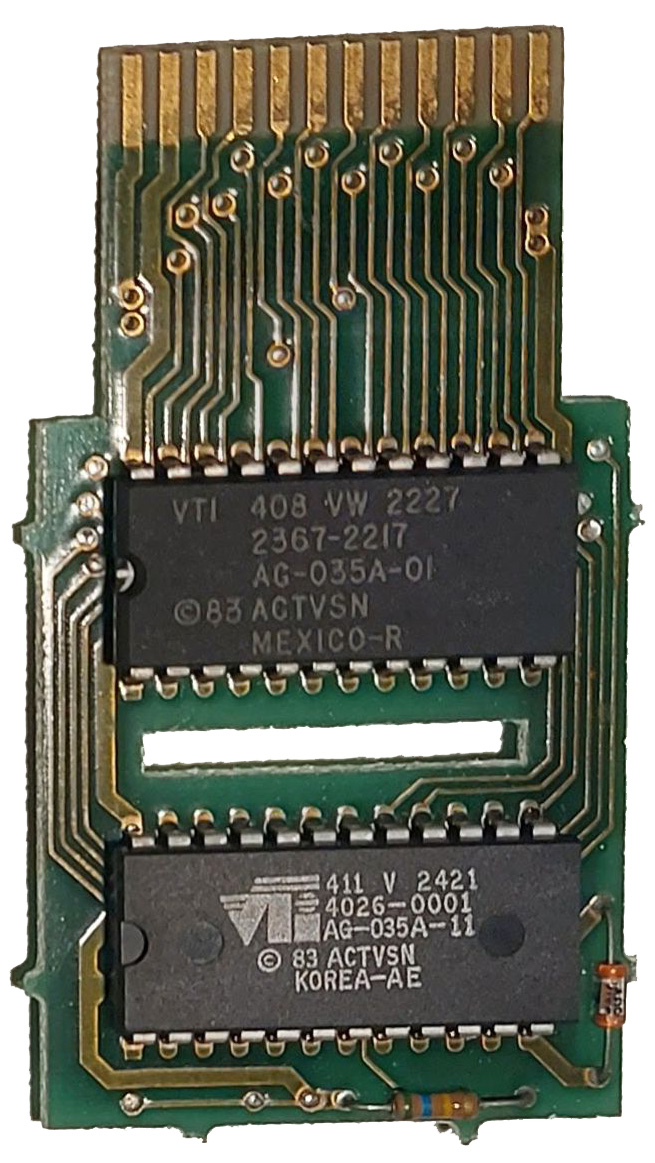
Pitfall II: Lost Caverns printed circuit board with Crane's custom Display Processor Chip at the bottom

David Crane's previous game Pitfall! (1982) was a major success for Activision and became the company's best selling release at the time. It led to large amounts of merchandising including board games, jigsaw puzzles, and the cartoon show Saturday Supercade, episodes of which featured Pitfall Harry and new characters such as Harry's niece Rhonda and the cowardly mountain lion Quickclaw. These characters introduced on the television series would later appear in the sequel Pitfall II: Lost Caverns.

Crane stated he made the sequel to Pitfall! "at a time when the Atari 2600 should have been replaced by a new gaming system." He had training as an electronics engineer and felt that the Atari 2600 "needed a boost" and designed a custom computer chip called the Display Processor Chip that was unique to Pitfall II: Lost Caverns. The chip allowed for additional graphic capabilities for the Atari 2600 and a music circuit. The chip contained special indexing registers that reduced the processing time for graphics operation by over 40%. Crane spoke about the developing the game and its graphics for the Atari 2600 at the 1984 Winter Consumer Electronics Show, stating that he would "stack Pitfall II against software in any other computer under $10,000. I might be able to make the boulders look more like boulders [on any other machine], but I could not make the game any better."

The chip enabled the playback of music that included a melody track, a harmony track, a bass track and percussion. This made Pitfall II the first Atari 2600 game with a full scored polyphonic musical track. The score consists of a four-part musical score composed by Crane, featuring a central "heroic" theme that plays before becoming a loop of more atmospheric music. The main theme in the game plays the bass through one channel, two channels play the melody and harmony while the last channel plays percussion sounds. The song "Sobre las olas" plays when Harry ascends using a balloon.

Crane explained that when Activision ported the game to other systems, another game programmer was assigned to convert assets and rewrite the code, as it was not a good use of his time to re-do a game he had already designed. The ports of the game for the Atari 800 and Atari 5200 were written by Mike Lorenzen, using Crane's original code with new graphics routines for the Atari hardware. The ColecoVision port was written from scratch by Robert Rutowski, and the Commodore 64 version was written from scratch by Tim Shotter.

Both the Atari 800 and Atari 5200 versions of the game included more areas to explore than the original Atari 2600 version. Lorenzen found time during production to create new levels that appear after the first game was completed. He explained he made the extra levels as he did not just want to recreate Crane's work, he wanted to "do something and make it better." This version is subtitled "The Adventurer’s Edition" on the title screen.

== Release ==
Pitfall II: Lost Caverns was released in February 1984. The game debuted at 9th place on Billboard's list of top 20 selling video games. Activision's national sales manager stated that the sales of the game exceeded the company's expectations by 25% to 30%. The game had a higher retail price ($34.95) than the usual game for the system due to Display Processor Chip.

Activision had reported slumping sales with operating loss of $4.1 million on $13.2 million in sales in the second quarter of 1984 and sought to remedy this with the release of Pitfall II: Lost Caverns. By the end of 1984, the game became the highest selling console game of the year.

At the June 1984 Consumer Electronics Show, Activision showed ports of Pitfall II: Lost Caverns for Commodore 64, Atari 8-bit computers, ColecoVision, IBM PCjr, and the Coleco Adam. The game was released for Atari 5200 in November 1984. The IBM PCjr version was released in the fourth quarter of 1984.

Pitfall II: Lost Caverns has been included in various video game collections, including Activision Anthology (2002) for PlayStation 2 and Activision Hits Remixed (2006) for the PlayStation Portable. The game is available as a hidden feature in both Pitfall: The Lost Expedition (2004) and Call of Duty: WWII (2017). It was released digitally as a downloadable title on the Xbox Game Room in 2010.

== Reception ==
=== Contemporary ===
Pitfall II: Lost Caverns received positive reviews upon its original release. Lou Hudson of the Fort Worth Star-Telegram, Bill Kunkel of Electronic Games, and the publication The Video Game Update all felt it was superior to Pitfall!, which Hudson and Kunkel felt grew repetitive with repeat play sessions. The graphics received praise, with Kunkel stating that it was "the kind of videogame that would be impressive if presented on a 48K computer. On the [Atari 2600], it's simply beyond belief." The reviewers also wrote about the gameplay, with Hudson describing it as "immensely improved action formula", while The Video Game Update enjoyed that the player could not die in the game, giving them more opportunity to explore the world. Kunkel concluded that the game "offers the most remarkable breadth of any 2600 video game yet produced." while The Video Game Update stated that "We have the opportunity to play and review hundreds of games every year, and there are very few that we feel must become part of your personal collection. Pitfall II is one of those."

Michael Blanchet, author of How to Beat the Video Games (1982), found that the game improved on the original with more enemies and obstacles to avoid and that it had a grander playing field than the original game, but concluded that the storyline for the game was sappy and the lack of having the character die made you lose incentive to play the game. Blanchet also opined that the constant presence of music was annoying.

In January 1985, Pitfall II won the award for Program of the Year for the Atari 2600 from Computer Entertainer magazine in their 1984 Awards of Excellence.

=== Retrospective ===
Modern critics have continued to praise Pitfall II: Lost Caverns. Skyler Miller of AllGame awarded it 4 1/2 stars out of 5, stating that the game was not as innovative as the original game, but that it expanded upon the original to create one of the system's most accomplished games. Miller specifically praised the graphics and music. Brett Weiss included the game in his book The 100 Greatest Console Video Games, 1977-1987 (2014), writing that the game was better than Pitfall! and that it offered a variety of fresh features.

John Harris of Game Developer said that Pitfall II was not quite as fun to play in 2007 as it was when it was first developed, but declared it to be one of the most advanced games for the Atari 2600, comparing its gameplay to the later Nintendo game Metroid (1986). Harris noted innovative elements such as being among the first games to include a checkpoint system. Writing for USgamer, Jeremy Parish echoed the Metroid comparison, stating that Pitfall II was a turning point in platform games. Parish said it led to games within the genre to have exploration, stating that "In the style of non-linear platformers to come, such as Metroid, there was no such thing as death by falling; dropping into a pit simply led Harry to another screen, and a vast underground lake lined the bottom of the game world. In many ways, it was a game years ahead of its time."

In their list of the top 25 Atari 2600 games, Stuart Hunt and Darran Jones of Retro Gamer magazine listed Pitfall II: Lost Caverns in the number one spot. The two wrote that the game was far more ambitious than the original and that it was "as playable today as it ever was." In the same publication, Mat Allen included the game along with Kaboom! (1981), River Raid (1982), Ghostbusters (1984), Little Computer People (1985) and Alter Ego (1986), as one of the best games from Activision's classic period.

== Legacy ==
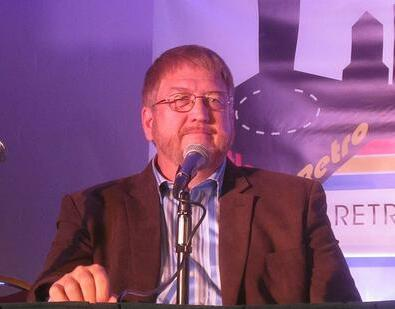
David Crane at the Retro Gaming Expo in 2011. Crane said that the Pitfall! games following Pitfall II: Lost Caverns were not "Pitfall! sequels as much as other games with the name Pitfall placed on them."

Following the release of Pitfall II: Lost Caverns, the Atari 2600 reached the end of its lifecycle as a system, and no other games for it were developed using Crane's Display Processor Chip. Crane was often asked if he would develop a third Pitfall game, he responded that "after one sequel, I was happy to move on to other ideas." Following work on Pitfall II, Crane began work developing games for the Commodore 64, starting with Ghostbusters (1984). Crane stayed with Activision until 1987.

Sega developed an arcade game titled Pitfall II: The Lost Caverns (1985) which featured gameplay elements from both of Crane's Pitfall games. The Japanese company Micronics developed Super Pitfall for the Nintendo Entertainment System, which was described by Stuart Hunt of Retro Gamer as a "loose port" of Crane's Pitfall II. Super Pitfall featured a similar storyline to Pitfall II involving Pitfall Harry exploring caves to seek the Raj diamond and rescue his niece Rhonda and Quickclaw the lion who have become trapped in the cave depths. In 2012, Crane stated he had seen all of the later Pitfall! games and had played a few of them, but he felt they were not "Pitfall sequels as much as other games with the name Pitfall placed on them."

== See also ==
- List of Activision games: 1980–1999
- List of Atari 2600 games
