= Pitfall! =

1982 video game

- Developer: Activision
- Publisher: Activision
- Designer: David Crane
- Series: Pitfall
- Platforms: Atari 2600, Intellivision, Atari 5200, ColecoVision, Atari 8-bit, Commodore 64, MSX
- Release: September 1982: 2600; September 1982; Intellivision; November 1982; ColecoVision; February 1984; Atari 8-bit, 5200; March 1984; C64; June 1984; MSX; September 1984
- Genre: Platform
- Mode: Single-player

Pitfall! is a 1982 platform video game developed by David Crane and published by Activision for the Atari 2600. The player controls Pitfall Harry, who has a time limit of 20 minutes to seek treasure in a jungle. The game world is populated by enemies and hazards that variously cause the player to lose lives or points. Pitfall! was ported to the Atari 5200, Atari 8-bit computers, ColecoVision, Commodore 64, and MSX.

Crane had made several games for both Atari, Inc. and Activision before working on Pitfall! in 1982. He started with creating a realistic-style walking animation for a person on the Atari 2600 hardware, then fashioned a game around it. He used a jungle setting with items to collect and enemies to avoid, and the result became Pitfall!

Pitfall! received positive reviews at the time of its release praising both its gameplay and graphics. It was influential in the platform game genre, and various publications have considered it as being amongst the greatest video games of all time. It is also one of the best-selling Atari 2600 video games, as well as the best-selling Atari 2600 game that’s not an arcade port. It has been included in various Activision compilation games and was included as a secret extra in later Activision-published titles. A more advanced sequel, Pitfall II: Lost Caverns, was released in 1984.

== Gameplay ==
Pitfall Harry swinging over a pit and two rolling logs. The score and timer are at the top. A scorpion is in the cave.

Pitfall! is a platform game set in a jungle where the player controls Pitfall Harry, a fortune hunter and explorer. Pitfall! has been characterized as a platformer by Nick Montfort and Ian Bogost, the authors of Racing the Beam. Similar to Superman (1979) and Adventure (1980), the game does not feature side-scrolling and instead loads one screen at a time, with a new screen appearing when the player character, Pitfall Harry, moves to the edge of the screen. The goal is to get Harry as many points as possible within a twenty-minute time limit. The player starts the game with 2,000 points and can collect a total of 32 treasures hidden among 255 scenes to increase their total, ranging from a money bag worth 2,000 points to a diamond ring worth 5,000 points.

Pitfall Harry moves left and right and can jump over and onto objects, swing from vines, and climb up and down ladders to seek treasure and avoid danger. The player can lose points from hazards, such as falling down a hole or colliding with rolling logs. The player starts with three lives and loses one if they sink into quicksand, swamps or tar pits, running into fire, or are hit by a scorpion, cobra rattler, or crocodile.

== Development ==
Pitfall! was developed by David Crane for Activision. Crane had worked at Atari, Inc. in the late 1970s, developing games for the Atari Video Computer System (the system became known as the Atari 2600 after the release of the Atari 5200 in 1982). After discovering the high profits Atari had made from games he developed, including Outlaw, Canyon Bomber and Slot Machine, he asked the president of Atari, Ray Kassar, for recognition on these titles and better pay. When he was turned down, Crane and other Atari programmers left the company to form Activision in 1979. Crane was the senior designer at Activision and created Dragster, Fishing Derby, Laser Blast, Freeway, and Grand Prix for the company prior to the release of Pitfall!

Crane stated his game design philosophy involved making the Atari 2600 do new and unexpected things. Crane said he "used this technique to lead me in a new direction of game design, and some of the tricks were to me as much as an accomplishment as solving the Rubik's Cube the first time". Early development of Pitfall! started with Crane trying to create realistically animated graphics on the Atari 2600. This led to developing a moving man (which became the basis of Pitfall Harry) and, later, the scorpions and snake obstacles. For three years, Crane experimented using the running-man character in different scenarios, such as a cops and robbers game, but could not find a proper situation for it. Crane began implementing it into a game in 1982. Crane stated having the running man animation led to putting him on a path, which led to placing the path in a jungle and giving the man a reason to run in order to hunt treasures and avoid enemies. The jungle setting of the game was influenced by the 1981 film Raiders of the Lost Ark.

Other influences came from Heckle and Jeckle cartoons, where two magpies outwit their enemies, including having the magpies run across the heads of crocodiles and just escaping their snapping jaws. This led to the ability of Pitfall Harry being able to cross ponds infested with crocodiles if their jaws were closed. Initially, to jump from one alligator head to another, the player had to move the joystick and jump at exactly the same time which Crane described as being "almost impossible to play. So I changed the code to allow you to direct Harry’s jump to the side, if you moved the joystick within a small instant from the time you pressed the button to jump. From a programming standpoint this was a tiny change, but it changed the gameplay from nearly impossible to an easily learned skill." Crane tried to make the sprite artwork for obstacles and the environment recognizable to players, despite the limitations of the Atari 2600. The process involved what Crane said was "a lot of trial-and-error". When asked if the arcade game Donkey Kong (1981) had inspired his game, Crane responded he did not draw any parallels to Pitfall! at the time and had already developed elements in his game that were present in both games, such as a human character, paths, and ladders.

Crane commented that "The entire [game design] process took about 10 minutes. About 1000 hours of programming later the game was complete." Much of Crane's time was spent optimizing and compressing the code so that it would fit into a four-kilobyte ROM cartridge. Unlike Haunted House (1982) or Raiders of the Lost Ark (1982), where the environments are hard-coded into the game, Pitfall! was generated constantly by code. The game generates each screen based on a counter that can run either backwards or forwards depending which direction the player moves from screen to screen. The 8 bits in the counter are used to determine details such as the background, trees, ground and object patterns, allowing 255 screens to occupy fewer than 50 bytes of ROM. Activision had created design centers for their games, which were small, close-knit teams of four to five people. These teams encouraged peer reviews and shared prototypes of games. In Pitfall!, Crane's team changed the initial number of lives in the game from one to three during the final week of development. Crane said that "my buddies practically tied me to my chair until I put in extra lives and I'm glad they did".

== Release ==
Pitfall! was released for the Atari 2600 in September 1982. The game was later released for the Intellivision in November 1982. To promote the game, Activision held a promotion between November 15 and December 13, 1982, in various markets across the United States for a chance to win $5,000 (equivalent to $17,000 in 2025) in gold. A TV commercial for Pitfall! featured actor Jack Black in his first acting role, at age 13. In January 1984, it was announced that Pitfall! would be released along with other Activision games such as River Raid, Megamania, and Beamrider for the Atari 5200, ColecoVision, Commodore 64, and MSX. Pitfall! was subsequently released for the ColecoVision in February, the Atari 8-bit computers and Atari 5200 in March, and the Commodore 64 in June. It was released in Japan for the MSX in September 1984.

Pitfall! was included in various video games collections, including Activision Classics (1998) for the PlayStation, Activision Anthology (2002) for PlayStation 2, and Activision Hits Remixed in 2006 for the PlayStation Portable. The game was also a secret extra in Activision-published titles like Pitfall: The Mayan Adventure (1994), Call of Duty: Infinite Warfare (2016), and Call of Duty: Black Ops Cold War (2020). Atari teased a large announcement on August 20, 2026 which ultimately turned into a re-release of several Activision games for the Atari 2600. This included Pitfall! set for a November 2026 release.

== Reception ==
Reception

Review scores
Publication	Score	
Publication	Atari 2600	Intellivision
Arcade Express	8/10	
Electronic Games		7/10
JoyStik How to Win at Video Games	5/5	
Micro & Video	5/5	4/5
Video Games Player	A	

In contemporary reviews, critics praised the gameplay and graphics in publications like Arcade Express and Electronic Fun with Computers & Games, with the former stating that it "may well be the best adventure game yet produced for the VCS". The reviewer for Blip stated that the game was similar to Donkey Kong (1981), but that "this is one case where inspiration didn't lead to imitation. Pitfall is its own game. It's also a heck of a lot of fun." In JoyStik: How to Win at Video Games, the game was named as one of the ten best games of 1982. The Atari 2600 version of Pitfall! was awarded "Best Adventure Video Game" at the 4th annual Arkie Awards in 1983.

Reviewing the Intellivision version in 1983, both Phil Wiswell in Video Games and Ignácio Machado of Micro & Video wrote that the game was too similar to the Atari 2600 version, with Wiswell saying the release did not take advantage enough of Intellivision's graphical capabilities. Electronic Games, in their "1983 Software Encyclopedia" issue, noted that the game required "more arcade-type skills than intuition or logic".

Pitfall! was the highest-selling video game from late 1982 to the first quarter of 1983. The game sold 1 million units in 1982. It held the top spot on the Top Video Games Billboard charts for 64 consecutive weeks and went on to sell over 3.5 million units by 1984. It is one of the best-selling games on the Atari 2600, with over four million copies sold as of 2008. All versions of the game sold over 5 million copies worldwide by 1998.

=== Retrospective reviews ===
Retrospective reception

Review scores
Publication	Score		
Publication	Atari 2600	ColecoVision	Intellivision
AllGame	5/5		4.5/5
Computer and Video Games	78%	79%	
Computer Games	A	A	
Electronic Games	9/10		

Later 1980s reviews continued to praise the game, such as the reviewer for Computer Games, who gave the game an A-rating in their 1985 game guide, praising the graphics as "gorgeous and cartoony" and declaring it a "terrific game for action fans". Computer and Video Games (1989) stated that Pitfall! was a "bright and cheery game" that offered plenty of long-term gameplay, continuing that the "game style might look a bit crumbly, but the action is a heap of fun".

Scott Alan Marriott of the online game database AllGame wrote that the variety of threats you encounter on each screen made Pitfall! one of the most exciting and best-looking games on the Atari 2600. Brett Alan Weiss included the game in his book The 100 Greatest Console Video Games 1977–1987 (2014) and criticized that the Atari 5200 version of the game had poor controls and the Intellivision version for requiring a second button for letting go of vines. Weiss found the ColecoVision version designed by Action Graphics to be the best of the three versions with improved visuals over the Atari 2600 game, although it failed to take true advantage of the systems graphic capabilities.

Pitfall! has been included in several best-of video games lists from various publications, such as Electronic Fun with Computers & Games in 1984, Flux (1995) where it placed 33rd, Game Informer (2001) where it placed 41st, and Time (2012).

== Legacy ==
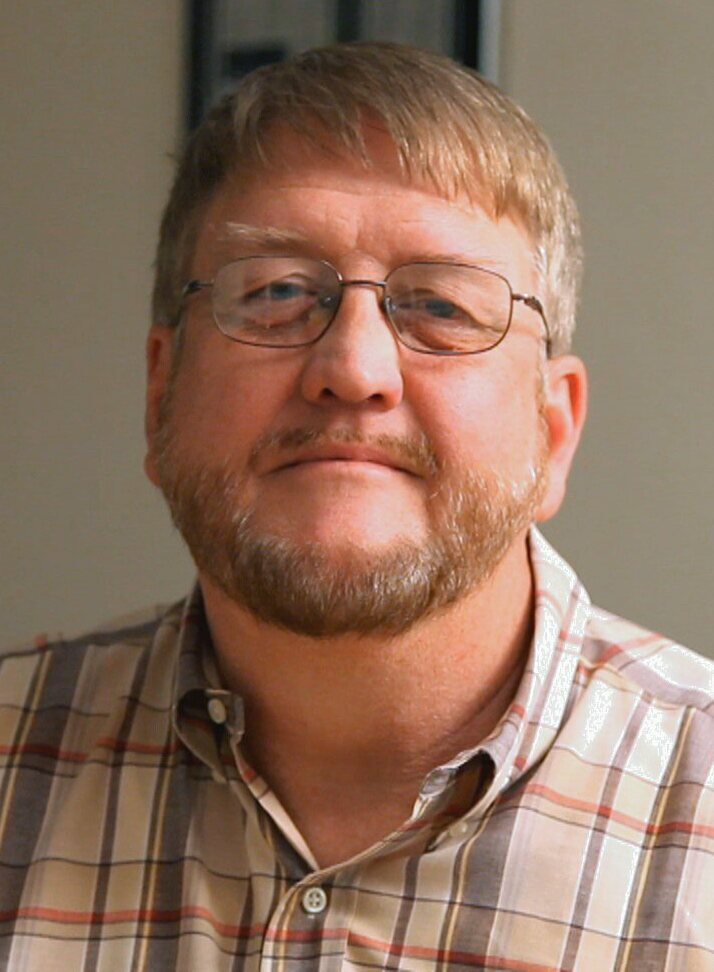
David Crane in 2013

Pitfall! was described by authors Montfort and Bogost in Racing the Beam as an important early platformer, a game genre made famous by Super Mario Bros. (1985). They wrote that Pitfall! was a much longer game than previous Atari VCS games. These other games were often ports of arcade games which were designed to be a short experience to keep the player pay to play, but even native games could be rather short—the easiest difficulty of Adventure can be completed in just two minutes. The authors said that Pitfall! built upon the graphic adventure game genre of Adventure to create an experience similar to later open-world games. According to them, the world was too large to be contemplated all at once, and a few core gameplay mechanics allowed a variety of more complex actions and possibilities. Jeff Gerstmann of GameSpot spoke similarly in 2004 when including Pitfall! in the site's "Greatest Games of All Time" list, stating that the game was "responsible for launching the platformer genre as we know it" and that "Despite the fact that platformers have become a lot more sophisticated, especially since video games in general made the shift to 3D, it's surprising how little the fundamentals—like jumping around, avoiding enemies and obstacles, and collecting stuff—have changed since Pitfall!"

Unlike Mario or Pac-Man, who originated in arcade games, Pitfall Harry was the first popular video game character originating in home consoles. The character was featured on licensed merchandise and appeared on the cartoon show Saturday Supercade, which aired from 1983 to 1985 on CBS. Crane said that Activision had to hire seven full-time staff to open and respond to the large amount of Pitfall! fan letters that Activision was receiving each week. Pitfall Harry was dropped for its second season.

=== Follow-ups ===
Release timeline
1982	Pitfall!
1983
1984	Pitfall II: Lost Caverns
1985	Pitfall II: The Lost Caverns
1986	Super Pitfall
1987–1993
1994	Pitfall: The Mayan Adventure
1995–1997
1998	Pitfall 3D: Beyond the Jungle
1998	Pitfall: Beyond the Jungle
1999–2003
2004	Pitfall: The Lost Expedition
2005–2011
2012	Pitfall!

Pitfall! spawned numerous sequels for consoles. These include Pitfall II: Lost Caverns (1984), Super Pitfall (1986) for the Nintendo Entertainment System, Pitfall: The Mayan Adventure (1994) for the Super Nintendo Entertainment System, Sega Genesis and Atari Jaguar (1995), Pitfall 3D: Beyond the Jungle (1998) for the PlayStation, Pitfall: Beyond the Jungle (1998) for the Game Boy Color, and Pitfall: The Lost Expedition for various systems in 2004.

Sega released Pitfall II: The Lost Caverns (1985) to arcades, which incorporated elements of Pitfall! and Pitfall II: Lost Caverns from the Atari 2600. Activision's UK-based studio The Blast Furnace released a follow-up titled Pitfall! (2012) for iOS on August 9, 2012. It features gameplay similar to that of Temple Run (2011).

Pitfall! remained the game that Crane has been most associated with. In 2012, he stated that "I suppose that's not a bad problem to have, It's not a dark shadow. But I'm not just a classic gaming guy. This is what I do for a living!" In the same year, he started a crowdfunding campaign Kickstarter to fund a spiritual successor to the Pitfall! series, but it fell far short of his funding goal.

== See also ==
- List of Activision games: 1980–1999
