= Pitfall! (2012 video game) =

2012 video game

- Developer: The Blast Furnace
- Publisher: Activision
- Series: Pitfall!
- Platforms: iOS, Android
- Release: iOS; August 9, 2012; Android; December 21, 2012
- Mode: Single-player

Pitfall! is an endless runner video game in the Pitfall! series, developed by British developer The Blast Furnace and published by Activision for iOS and Android in 2012. The latter version was released to coincide with the 2012 phenomenon's supposed Mayan apocalypse. The game has since been taken off the app store.

== Gameplay ==
Protagonist Pitfall Harry attempts to evade an active volcano through an endless environment on foot and sometimes on a motorcycle or in a mine cart.

== Reception ==
Reception

Aggregate score
Aggregator	Score
Metacritic	69/100

Review scores
Publication	Score
4Players	71%
Gamezebo	4/5
IGN	7/10
MacLife	3.5/5
Pocket Gamer	3/5
Polygon	6/10
Digital Spy	4/5

The iOS version received "average" reviews according to the review aggregation website Metacritic.
