= List of arcade video games: H =

This is a list of arcade video games organized alphabetically by name. It does not include PC or console games unless they were also released in video arcades. See Lists of video games for related lists.

Title	Alternate Title(s)	Year	Manufacturer	Genre(s)	Max. Players	PCB Model
Hacha Mecha Fighter	—	1991	NMK	Scrolling shooter		
Hachoo!	—	1989	Jaleco	Beat em Up		
HAL 21	—	1985	SNK		2	
Half-Life 2: Survivor	—	2006	Valve, Taito	First-person shooter	Multiplayer	
Halley's Comet	—	1986	Taito	Scrolling shooter	2	
Halley's Comet'87	—	1987	Taito	Scrolling shooter	2	
Hammerin' Harry	—	1990	Irem	Action	2	
Hana Arashi	—	1993	Asahi Bussan	Hanafuda video game	1	
Hana Awase	—	1982	Seta Kikaku	Hanafuda video game	1	
Hana Night Rose	—	2000	Techno-Top	Hanafuda video game	1	
Hana no Mai	—	1988	Dynax	Hanafuda video game	1	
Hana no Ren-Chan II	—	1995	K&K Electron	Hanafuda video game	1	
Hana Oriduru	—	1989	Dynax	Hanafuda video game	1	
Hana wo Yaraneba!	—	1991	Dynax	Hanafuda video game	1	
Hanafubuki	—	1987	Dynax	Hanafuda video game	1	
Hanagumi Taisen Columns: Sakura Taisen	—	1997	Atlus			Sega ST-V
The Hand	Got-Ya	1981	Game-A-Tron			
Hang Pilot	—	1997	Konami			
Hang-On	Dodgem	1985	Sega AM2	Racing	1	
Hang-On Jr.	Dodgem	1985	Sega AM2	Racing	1	
Hangman	—	1998	JPM		2	
Hangman - The Video Game	—	1984	Status Games			
Happy 6-in-1	—	2004	International Games System			
Happy Tour	—	2005	GAV			
Hard Drivin'	—	1989	Atari Games	Driving	1	
Hard Dunk	—	1994	Sega	Sports	6	
Hard Hat	—	1982	Exidy	Maze	2	
Hard Head	—	1988	SunA	Platform game	2	
Hard Head 2	—	1991	SunA	Platform game	2	
Hard Puncher Hajime no Ippo: The Fighting	—	2001	Taito		2	
Hard Puncher Hajime no Ippo 2 Ouja e no Chousen	—	2002	Taito		2	
Hard Times	—	1994	Playmark		2	
Harem	—	1983	I.G.R.		2	
Harem Challenge	—	1995	CD Express		2	Cubo CD32
Harley-Davidson & L.A. Riders	—	1997	Sega	Racing	1	
Hasamu	—	1991	Irem		2	
Hat Trick	—	1984	Bally Sente	Sports	2	
Hat Trick Hero	Football Champ ^{NA} Euro Champ '92 ^{EU}	1991	Taito	Sports	4	
Hat Trick Hero '93	Taito Cup Finals	1993	Taito	Sports	4	
Hat Trick Hero '94	International Cup '94	1994	Taito	Sports	4	
Hat Trick Hero '95	Taito Power Goal	1995	Taito	Sports	4	
Hatena? no Daibouken - Adventure Quiz 2	—	1990	Capcom			
Hatris	—	1990	Video System	Puzzle	2	
Haunted Castle	Akumajō Dracula	1988	Konami	Scrolling fighter	2	
Hayaoshi Quiz Grand Champion Taikai	—	1994	Jaleco			
Hayaoshi Quiz Nettou Namahousou	—	1994	Jaleco			
Hayaoshi Quiz Ouza Ketteisen	—	1993	Jaleco			
Hayaoshi Taisen Quiz HYHOO	—	1987	Nichibutsu			
Hayaoshi Taisen Quiz HYHOO 2	—	1987	Nichibutsu			
Hayazashi Shougi Gogatsu Mayjinsen	—	1994	Seta			
Hayazashi Shougi Gogatsu Mayjinsen 2	—	1994	Seta			
Head On	—	1979	Irem		2	
Head On (2 Player)	—	1979	Irem		2	
Head On 2	—	1979	Sega		2	
Head Panic - Polly & Sally Adventure	—					
Heart Attack - The A Maze Zing	—					
Heated Barrel	—					
Heaven's Gate	—	1996	Atlus	Fighting Game		ZN-1
Heavy Barrel	—	1987	Data East	Run and Gun	2	
Heavy Gear II	—	1999				
Heavy Metal	—	1985	Sega			
Heavy Metal: Geomatrix	—	2001	Sega/Capcom			
Heavy Smash	—	1993	Data East			
Heavy Unit	—	1988	Taito			
Heavyweight Champ	—	1986	Sega			
Hebereke's Popoon	Hebereke no PopoonJP	1993	Sunsoft	Puzzle	2	
Heiankyo Alien	—	1980	Denki Onkyo	Maze	2	
Helifire	—	1980	Nintendo			
Hellfire	—	1989	Toaplan	Scrolling shooter	2	
The Hermit	—	1995	Dugamex			
Hero in the Castle of Doom	Hero	1983	Crown Vending USA			
Heuk sun baek sa	—	1997	F2 System			
Hex Pool	Rack + Roll	1997	Status Games			
Hexa	—	199?	D.R. Korea	Puzzle		
Hexion	—	1991	Konami	Puzzle	2	
Hi Pai Paradise	—	2003	Aruze	Action	2	
Hi Pai Paradise 2: Onsen ni Ikou Yo!	—	2004	Aruze	Action	2	
Hi-way	Highway	1975	Atari	Racing	1	
Hidden Catch	—	1998	Eolith		2	
Hidden Catch 2	—	1999	Eolith		2	
Hidden Catch 2000	—	1999	Eolith		2	
Hidden Catch 3	—	1999	Eolith		2	
High Impact Football	—	1990		Sports		
High Rate DVD No.1: Mahjong Gal-pri - World Gal-con Grandprix	—	1998	Nichibutsu			Nichibutsu High Rate DVD
High Rate DVD No.2: Sengoku Mahjong Kurenai Otome-tai	—	1998	Nichibutsu			Nichibutsu High Rate DVD
High Rate DVD No.3: Junai - Manatsu no First Kiss	—	1998	Nichibutsu			Nichibutsu High Rate DVD
High Rate DVD No.4: Mahjong/Handafuda Cosplay Tengoku 5	—	1998	Nichibutsu			Nichibutsu High Rate DVD
High Rate DVD No.5: Junai 2 - White Love Story	—	1998	Nichibutsu			Nichibutsu High Rate DVD
High Rate DVD No.6: Mahjong Mogitate	—	1999	Nichibutsu			Nichibutsu High Rate DVD
High Rate DVD No.7: Mahjong Mania - Kairakukan he Youkoso	—	1999	Nichibutsu			Nichibutsu High Rate DVD
High Rate DVD No.8: Renai Mahjong Idol Gakuen	—	1999	Nichibutsu			Nichibutsu High Rate DVD
High Rate DVD No.9: BiKiNiKo - Okinawa de Ippai Shichaishimashita	—	1999	Nichibutsu			Nichibutsu High Rate DVD
High Rate DVD No.10: Mahjong/Hanafuda Cosplay Tengoku 6 - Jyunai hen	—	1999	Nichibutsu			Nichibutsu High Rate DVD
High Rate DVD No.11: The Nanpa	—	1999	Nichibutsu			Nichibutsu High Rate DVD
High Rate DVD No.12: Poka Poka Onsen de CHU - Bijin 3 Shimai ni Kiotsukete!	—	1999	Nichibutsu			Nichibutsu High Rate DVD
High Rate DVD No.13: Cosplay Tengoku 7 - Super Co-gal Grandprix	—	2000	Nichibutsu			Nichibutsu High Rate DVD
High Rate DVD No.14: Ai-Mode Pet Shiiku	—	2000	Nichibutsu			Nichibutsu High Rate DVD
High Rate DVD No.15: Fuudol	—	2000	Nichibutsu			Nichibutsu High Rate DVD
High Rate DVD No.16: Nurete Mitaino... - Net Idol Hen	—	2000	Nichibutsu			Nichibutsu High Rate DVD
High Rate DVD No.17: Tsuugakuro no Yuuwaku	—	2000	Nichibutsu			Nichibutsu High Rate DVD
High Rate DVD No.18: Torarechattano - AV Kantoku Hen	—	2001	Nichibutsu			Nichibutsu High Rate DVD
High Rate DVD No.19: Konnano Hajimete!	—	2001	Nichibutsu			Nichibutsu High Rate DVD
High School Graffitti Mikie	—	1984	Konami	Action		
High Seas Havoc	—	1993	Data East	Action		
High Voltage	—	1985	Alpha Denshi			
Highway Race	—	1983	Taito	Racing		
Higurashi no Naku Koro ni Jong	—	2009	AQ Interactive	Mahjong video game		
Himeshikibu	—	1989	Hi-Soft			
Hippodrome	Fighting Fantasy	1989	Data East			
Hit 'n Miss	—	1987	Exidy			
Hit Me	21; Super 21	1976	Mirco Games	Card game	1	
Hit the Ice	—	1990	Taito			
Hockey	—	1973	RamTek			
Hoccer	—	1983	Eastern Micro Electronics	Sports	2	
Hog Wild	—	2003	Uniania	Racing game		
Hold & Draw	—	1981	Amstar Electronics			
Hole Land	—	1984	Tecfri	Action game		
Holosseum	—	1992	Sega	Fighting	2	
Homura	—	2005	Taito			
Honey Dolls	—	1995	Barko			
Honkaku Hayasashi Shougi Meijinsen 3	—	1999	Seta			Aleck64
Hook	—	1992	Irem	Beat 'em up	4	
Hopper Robo	—	1983	Sega		2	
Hopping Mappy	—	1986	Namco	Action	2	Namco System 86
Horizon	—	1985	Irem	Scrolling shooter	2	
Host Invaders	—	1998	ICE	Rail shooter	2	
Hot Blocks: Tetrix II	—	1993	NIX		2	
Hot Body I	Same SameKOR	1995	Gameace			
Hot Body II	—	1995	Gameace	{		
Hot Chase	—	1988	Konami	Racing	1	
Hot Memory	—	1994	Tuning			
Hot Mind	—	1995	Playmark			
Hot Night	—	1994	Bulldog Amusements			
Hot Pinball	—	1995	Comad			
Hot Rod	—	1988	Sega	Racing	2	
Hot Shocker	—	1982	E.G. Felago			
Hot Shots Tennis	—	1990		Sports	2	
Hot Smash	—	1987	Taito			
Hotdog Storm - The First Supersonics	—	1996	Marble	Scrolling shooter	2	
House Mannequin: Roppongi Live hen	—	1987	Nichibutsu			
House Mannequin: Yuuwaku Nikki hen	—	1987	Nichibutsu			
House of Cards	—	1983	House of Cards, Inc.	Card Game		
House of the Dead, The	—	1996	Wow Entertainment	Rail shooter	2	
House of the Dead 2, The	—	1998	Wow Entertainment	Rail shooter	2	
House of the Dead III, The	—	2002	Wow Entertainment	Rail shooter	2	
House of the Dead 4, The	—	2005	Sega			
House of the Dead: Scarlet Dawn	—	2018	Sega			
Hummer	—	2009	Sega			
Hunchback	—	1983	Century Electronics	Platform Game	2	
Hunchback Olympic	Herbie at the Olympics	1984	Century Electronics	Sports Game	2	
Hustle	—	1977	Gremlin Industries	Maze	2	
HWY Chase	—	1980	Data East			DECO
Hydra	—	1990	Atari Games	Driving	1	Atari G1
Hydro Thunder	—	1999	Midway Games	Racing	2	
Hyper Athlete	—	1996	Konami			
Hyper Bishi Bashi Champ	—					
Hyper Bishi Bashi Champ 2 Player Version	—					
Hyper Crash	—	1987	Konami	Driving	1	
Hyper Duel	—	1993	TechnoSoft			
Hyper Dyne Side Arms	—	1986	Capcom	Scrolling shooter		
Hyper Pacman	—	1995	Semicom	Maze	2	
Hyper Sports	Hyper Olympic '84^{JP}	1984	Konami	Sports	4	
Hyper Street Fighter II	Hyper Street Fighter II - The Anniversary Edition	2003	Capcom	Fighting	2	
HyperBowl	—	1999	Sony	Sports		
Hyperdrive	—					
