= Game Room =

Video game service

- Developer: Krome Studios
- Publisher: Microsoft Studios
- Platforms: Xbox 360, Windows
- Release: March 24, 2010
- Genre: Various
- Mode: Single-player

Game Room is a discontinued video game compilation distribution system developed by Krome Studios and published by Microsoft Studios for the Xbox 360, Microsoft Windows and Windows Phone 7. It includes arcade and console video games owned by Activision, Atari, Intellivision and Konami. Launched on March 24, 2010, Game Room let players download classic video games and compete against each other for high scores. Players on both Xbox 360 and Windows PCs could access Game Room through their respective versions of Microsoft's Live online services (Xbox Live and Games for Windows – Live). The servers shut down on October 31, 2017, but Xbox 360 users are still able to redownload the software and purchased games.

At the 2011 Consumer Electronics Show, Microsoft announced a mobile version of Game Room for Windows Phone 7. Asteroids Deluxe was the only game announced, but a show floor demo revealed working prototypes of Centipede and Shao-lin's Road.

== Format ==
The Game Room front end could be downloaded at no charge from Microsoft's Marketplace online storefront and can still be re-downloaded by purchasers as of March, 2026. When launched, players are presented with a three-story virtual video arcade, each story containing four separate rooms. These rooms may be decorated however the player wishes, using the included themes and set pieces. The player can fill the rooms with virtual game cabinets that are used to play arcade and console games downloaded through the service, with each room holding a maximum of eight cabinets.

Games for Game Room were made available through downloadable game packs. While the packs were free to download, individual games needed to be purchased in order to be played fully. Players could play each game in the pack once without charge, limited to ten minutes of game time. Games were purchased on a game-by-game basis, which allows unlimited play of the game.

Previously, this was limited to Xbox 360 or Games for Windows, but a late update removed this distinction, defaulting the game purchases to the previous "Play Anywhere" model (a multiplatform spending model that would be expanded years later for Xbox One and Windows 10 as Xbox Play Anywhere).

== Gameplay ==
Games in Game Room are launched by selecting them while players browse through their arcade. Each game offers a "classic mode", where one can set a number of gameplay options, dependent on the game's format. Arcade games have DIP switches that may be changed in order to increase difficulty or offer additional lives to the player, while console games have their original gameplay variations. Both are accessible using Game Room's on-screen interfaces.

Also, some games can be played in a special "ranked mode," which allows scores to be posted to online leaderboards while limiting gameplay options to a single variation common to all players, as well as disallowing several Game Room options, seemingly to prevent falsifying rankings or other forms of cheating.

While browsing their arcades, players see avatars of themselves and their online friends wandering around and playing the games; Xbox 360 players see their console avatars, while PC players see generic avatars instead. Similarly, players may visit the arcades of their online friends as well as play the games found there. If a friend's arcade has a game that the player does not own, the player may purchase plays or may use their in-game tokens. However, the player may play copies of a game they already own for free. Players may also challenge their friends at various games in both score-based and skill-based contests.

During gameplay, players win medals based on their score or how long they have played the game (both for that individual play and all-time on that game). Medals are offered in gold, silver and bronze, with each being worth a certain number of points. As players earn medals, they can advance in levels, which will unlock new themes and set pieces to be used in their arcades. Like other LIVE titles, players also earn achievements based on their gameplay.

== Game selection ==
The initial game pack releases for Game Room were a mix of arcade, Intellivision, and Atari 2600 games. Other arcade machines were also to be covered, with Microsoft promising at least 1000 virtual arcade cabinets over the subsequent three years. Despite Microsoft's promise, there have not been any new games or other content since Game Pack 13 was released on December 22, 2010. Initially, Microsoft announced plans to release game packs weekly, starting on April 28, 2010, although the first new release did not take place until May 5, 2010.

=== Available games ===
Title	Platform	Release date	Pack	Publisher
3-D Tic-Tac-Toe	Atari 2600	August 4, 2010	Game Pack 008	Atari
A Game of Concentration	Atari 2600	September 1, 2010	Game Pack 009	Atari
The Activision Decathlon	Atari 2600	July 28, 2010	Game Pack 007	Activision
Adventure	Atari 2600	March 24, 2010	Game Pack 002	Atari
Air-Sea Battle	Atari 2600	June 16, 2010	Game Pack 005	Atari
Amidar	Arcade	December 1, 2010	Game Pack 012	Konami
Armor Battle	Intellivision	March 24, 2010	Game Pack 001	Intellivision
Asteroids	Arcade	May 19, 2010	Game Pack 004	Atari
Asteroids	Atari 2600	July 28, 2010	Game Pack 007	Atari
Asteroids Deluxe	Arcade	March 24, 2010	Game Pack 001	Atari
Astrosmash	Intellivision	March 24, 2010	Game Pack 001	Intellivision
Auto Racing	Intellivision	July 28, 2010	Game Pack 007	Intellivision
Barnstorming	Atari 2600	July 14, 2010	Game Pack 007	Activision
Baseball	Intellivision	June 9, 2010	Game Pack 005	Intellivision
Basketball	Intellivision	May 5, 2010	Game Pack 003	Intellivision
Battlantis	Arcade	March 24, 2010	Game Pack 001	Konami
Battlezone	Arcade	May 12, 2010	Game Pack 003	Atari
Beamrider	Atari 2600	August 4, 2010	Game Pack 008	Activision
Black Widow	Arcade	June 23, 2010	Game Pack 006	Atari
Blades of Steel	Arcade	November 24, 2010	Game Pack 012	Konami
Body Slam: Super Pro Wrestling	Intellivision	October 6, 2010	Game Pack 010	Intellivision
Bowling	Atari 2600	September 22, 2010	Game Pack 010	Atari
Boxing	Atari 2600	September 1, 2010	Game Pack 009	Activision
Boxing	Intellivision	May 26, 2010	Game Pack 004	Intellivision
Breakout	Atari 2600	October 27, 2010	Game Pack 011	Atari
Bridge	Atari 2600	September 8, 2010	Game Pack 009	Activision
Buzz Bombers	Intellivision	May 26, 2010	Game Pack 004	Intellivision
Canyon Bomber	Atari 2600	May 12, 2010	Game Pack 003	Atari
Casino	Atari 2600	June 23, 2010	Game Pack 006	Atari
Centipede	Arcade	March 24, 2010	Game Pack 002	Atari
Centipede	Atari 2600	August 4, 2010	Game Pack 008	Atari
Checkers	Atari 2600	August 25, 2010	Game Pack 009	Activision
Chip Shot Golf	Intellivision	August 18, 2010	Game Pack 008	Intellivision
Chopper Command	Atari 2600	June 16, 2010	Game Pack 005	Activision
Circus Atari	Atari 2600	June 9, 2010	Game Pack 005	Atari
City Bomber	Arcade	August 25, 2010	Game Pack 009	Konami
Codebreaker	Atari 2600	December 22, 2010	Game Pack 013	Atari
Combat	Atari 2600	March 24, 2010	Game Pack 001	Atari
Cosmic Commuter	Atari 2600	August 4, 2010	Game Pack 008	Activision
Crackpots	Atari 2600	June 30, 2010	Game Pack 006	Activision
Crystal Castles	Arcade	March 24, 2010	Game Pack 001	Atari
Deep Pocket Billiards	Intellivision	September 29, 2010	Game Pack 010	Intellivision
Demons to Diamonds	Atari 2600	May 19, 2010	Game Pack 004	Atari
Desert Falcon	Atari 2600	December 22, 2010	Game Pack 013	Atari
Detana!! TwinBee	Arcade	December 8, 2010	Game Pack 012	Konami
Devastators	Arcade	December 22, 2010	Game Pack 013	Konami
Dodge 'Em	Atari 2600	August 11, 2010	Game Pack 008	Atari
Dolphin	Atari 2600	August 11, 2010	Game Pack 008	Activision
Double Dunk	Atari 2600	October 27, 2010	Game Pack 011	Atari
Dragster	Atari 2600	August 11, 2010	Game Pack 008	Activision
Enduro	Atari 2600	July 21, 2010	Game Pack 007	Activision
Finalizer: Super Transformation	Arcade	March 24, 2010	Game Pack 001	Konami
Fishing Derby	Atari 2600	July 14, 2010	Game Pack 007	Activision
Food Fight	Arcade	December 15, 2010	Game Pack 012	Atari
Football	Atari 2600	December 22, 2010	Game Pack 013	Atari
Freeway	Atari 2600	August 18, 2010	Game Pack 008	Activision
Frog Bog	Intellivision	June 2, 2010	Game Pack 005	Intellivision
Frostbite	Atari 2600	July 28, 2010	Game Pack 007	Activision
Galactic Warriors	Arcade	September 22, 2010	Game Pack 010	Konami
Golf	Atari 2600	November 10, 2010	Game Pack 011	Atari
Grand Prix	Atari 2600	May 19, 2010	Game Pack 004	Activision
Gravitar	Arcade	March 24, 2010	Game Pack 002	Atari
Gravitar	Atari 2600	July 21, 2010	Game Pack 007	Atari
Gyruss	Arcade	July 14, 2010	Game Pack 007	Konami
H.E.R.O.	Atari 2600	June 23, 2010	Game Pack 006	Activision
Hard Hat	Intellivision	September 8, 2010	Game Pack 009	Intellivision
Haunted House	Atari 2600	May 26, 2010	Game Pack 004	Atari
Hockey	Intellivision	August 11, 2010	Game Pack 008	Intellivision
Horse Racing	Intellivision	September 22, 2010	Game Pack 010	Intellivision
Hover Force	Intellivision	July 14, 2010	Game Pack 007	Intellivision
Human Cannonball	Atari 2600	November 10, 2010	Game Pack 011	Atari
Hyper Crash	Arcade	September 29, 2010	Game Pack 010	Konami
Ice Hockey	Atari 2600	July 21, 2010	Game Pack 007	Activision
Iron Horse	Arcade	December 22, 2010	Game Pack 013	Konami
Jackal	Arcade	October 27, 2010	Game Pack 011	Konami
Jail Break	Arcade	July 28, 2010	Game Pack 007	Konami
Jungler	Arcade	March 24, 2010	Game Pack 002	Konami
Juno First	Arcade	June 30, 2010	Game Pack 006	Konami
Kabobber	Atari 2600	November 3, 2010	Game Pack 011	Activision
Kaboom!	Atari 2600	June 30, 2010	Game Pack 006	Activision
Keystone Kapers	Atari 2600	May 12, 2010	Game Pack 003	Activision
Kitten Kaboodle	Arcade	September 15, 2010	Game Pack 009	Konami
Konami GT	Arcade	October 6, 2010	Game Pack 010	Konami
Konami's Ping Pong	Arcade	June 16, 2010	Game Pack 005	Konami
Laser Blast	Atari 2600	June 23, 2010	Game Pack 006	Activision
Liberator	Arcade	June 16, 2010	Game Pack 005	Atari
Lunar Lander	Arcade	March 24, 2010	Game Pack 001	Atari
M.I.A.: Missing in Action	Arcade	December 15, 2010	Game Pack 012	Konami
The Main Event	Arcade	December 22, 2010	Game Pack 013	Konami
Major Havoc	Arcade	July 7, 2010	Game Pack 006	Atari
Maze Craze	Atari 2600	August 18, 2010	Game Pack 008	Atari
Mega Zone	Arcade	May 12, 2010	Game Pack 003	Konami
Megamania	Atari 2600	May 5, 2010	Game Pack 003	Activision
Millipede	Arcade	May 26, 2010	Game Pack 004	Atari
Millipede	Atari 2600	March 24, 2010	Game Pack 002	Atari
Miniature Golf	Atari 2600	November 10, 2010	Game Pack 011	Atari
Missile Command	Arcade	June 2, 2010	Game Pack 005	Atari
Missile Command	Atari 2600	September 29, 2010	Game Pack 010	Atari
Motocross	Intellivision	June 16, 2010	Game Pack 005	Intellivision
Mountain Madness: Super Pro Skiing	Intellivision	March 24, 2010	Game Pack 002	Intellivision
Mr. Goemon	Arcade	June 2, 2010	Game Pack 005	Konami
MX5000	Arcade	September 15, 2010	Game Pack 009	Konami
NFL Football	Intellivision	March 24, 2010	Game Pack 002	Intellivision
Night Driver	Atari 2600	May 12, 2010	Game Pack 003	Atari
Night Stalker	Intellivision	May 5, 2010	Game Pack 003	Intellivision
Off the Wall	Atari 2600	December 1, 2010	Game Pack 012	Atari
Oink!	Atari 2600	May 12, 2010	Game Pack 003	Activision
Outlaw	Atari 2600	March 24, 2010	Game Pack 001	Atari
Pinball	Intellivision	August 25, 2010	Game Pack 009	Intellivision
Pitfall!	Atari 2600	May 5, 2010	Game Pack 003	Activision
Pitfall II: Lost Caverns	Atari 2600	November 24, 2010	Game Pack 012	Activision
Plaque Attack	Atari 2600	September 22, 2010	Game Pack 010	Activision
Pooyan	Arcade	December 8, 2010	Game Pack 012	Konami
Pressure Cooker	Atari 2600	September 29, 2010	Game Pack 010	Activision
Private Eye	Atari 2600	October 6, 2010	Game Pack 010	Activision
Quadrun	Atari 2600	July 14, 2010	Game Pack 007	Atari
Rack 'Em Up	Arcade	May 5, 2010	Game Pack 003	Konami
Radar Lock	Atari 2600	October 13, 2010	Game Pack 010	Atari
RealSports Baseball	Atari 2600	December 22, 2010	Game Pack 013	Atari
RealSports Tennis	Atari 2600	March 24, 2010	Game Pack 002	Atari
RealSports Volleyball	Atari 2600	May 5, 2010	Game Pack 003	Atari
Red Baron	Arcade	March 24, 2010	Game Pack 001	Atari
Reversi	Intellivision	September 8, 2010	Game Pack 009	Intellivision
River Raid	Atari 2600	May 26, 2010	Game Pack 004	Activision
River Raid II	Atari 2600	June 9, 2010	Game Pack 005	Activision
Road Fighter	Arcade	March 24, 2010	Game Pack 002	Konami
Scooter Shooter	Arcade	July 7, 2010	Game Pack 006	Konami
Scramble	Arcade	March 24, 2010	Game Pack 001	Konami
Sea Battle	Intellivision	March 24, 2010	Game Pack 001	Intellivision
Seaquest	Atari 2600	August 18, 2010	Game Pack 008	Activision
Shao-lin's Road	Arcade	March 24, 2010	Game Pack 002	Konami
Shark! Shark!	Intellivision	May 19, 2010	Game Pack 004	Intellivision
Sharp Shot	Intellivision	October 6, 2010	Game Pack 010	Intellivision
Skiing	Atari 2600	June 2, 2010	Game Pack 005	Activision
Skiing	Intellivision	November 17, 2010	Game Pack 011	Intellivision
Sky Diver	Atari 2600	July 7, 2010	Game Pack 006	Atari
Sky Jinks	Atari 2600	June 9, 2010	Game Pack 005	Activision
Slam Dunk Basketball	Intellivision	December 22, 2010	Game Pack 013	Intellivision
Slap Shot: Super Pro Hockey	Intellivision	November 17, 2010	Game Pack 011	Intellivision
Snafu	Intellivision	August 18, 2010	Game Pack 008	Intellivision
Soccer	Intellivision	May 12, 2010	Game Pack 003	Intellivision
Space Armada	Intellivision	March 24, 2010	Game Pack 001	Intellivision
Space Battle	Intellivision	November 17, 2010	Game Pack 011	Intellivision
Space Cadet	Intellivision	November 3, 2010	Game Pack 011	Intellivision
Space Duel	Arcade	May 19, 2010	Game Pack 004	Atari
Space Hawk	Intellivision	March 24, 2010	Game Pack 002	Intellivision
Space War	Atari 2600	November 3, 2010	Game Pack 011	Atari
Spider Fighter	Atari 2600	May 26, 2010	Game Pack 004	Activision
Spiker! Super Pro Volleyball	Intellivision	December 15, 2010	Game Pack 012	Intellivision
Sprint Master	Atari 2600	November 3, 2010	Game Pack 011	Atari
Stampede	Atari 2600	May 19, 2010	Game Pack 004	Activision
Star Raiders	Atari 2600	March 24, 2010	Game Pack 002	Atari
Star Ship	Atari 2600	December 22, 2010	Game Pack 013	Atari
Star Strike	Intellivision	June 30, 2010	Game Pack 006	Intellivision
Starmaster	Atari 2600	July 7, 2010	Game Pack 006	Activision
Strategy X	Arcade	May 26, 2010	Game Pack 004	Konami
Street Racer	Atari 2600	October 13, 2010	Game Pack 010	Atari
Sub Hunt	Intellivision	March 24, 2010	Game Pack 002	Intellivision
Submarine Commander	Atari 2600	October 13, 2010	Game Pack 010	Atari
Super Basketball	Arcade	September 1, 2010	Game Pack 009	Konami
Super Breakout	Arcade	May 5, 2010	Game Pack 003	Atari
Super Breakout	Atari 2600	September 1, 2010	Game Pack 009	Atari
Super Cobra	Arcade	March 24, 2010	Game Pack 002	Konami
Super Football	Atari 2600	November 10, 2010	Game Pack 011	Atari
Super Pro Decathlon	Intellivision	August 11, 2010	Game Pack 008	Intellivision
Surround	Atari 2600	December 22, 2010	Game Pack 013	Atari
Tempest	Arcade	March 24, 2010	Game Pack 002	Atari
Tennis	Atari 2600	August 25, 2010	Game Pack 009	Activision
Tennis	Intellivision	December 22, 2010	Game Pack 013	Intellivision
Thin Ice	Intellivision	August 4, 2010	Game Pack 008	Intellivision
Thunder Castle	Intellivision	September 8, 2010	Game Pack 009	Intellivision
Thwocker	Atari 2600	December 8, 2010	Game Pack 012	Activision
Time Pilot	Arcade	May 19, 2010	Game Pack 004	Konami
Tower of Doom	Intellivision	July 21, 2010	Game Pack 007	Intellivision
Trick Trap	Arcade	November 24, 2010	Game Pack 012	Konami
Triple Action	Intellivision	June 23, 2010	Game Pack 006	Intellivision
Tutankham	Arcade	March 24, 2010	Game Pack 001	Konami
TwinBee	Arcade	December 1, 2010	Game Pack 012	Konami
Utopia	Intellivision	July 7, 2010	Game Pack 006	Intellivision
Vectron	Intellivision	November 24, 2010	Game Pack 012	Intellivision
Venetian Blinds	Atari 2600	December 22, 2010	Game Pack 013	Activision
Video Chess	Atari 2600	September 8, 2010	Game Pack 009	Atari
Video Hustler	Arcade	June 9, 2010	Game Pack 005	Konami
Video Pinball	Atari 2600	June 2, 2010	Game Pack 005	Atari
Warlords	Arcade	June 30, 2010	Game Pack 006	Atari
Warlords	Atari 2600	December 15, 2010	Game Pack 012	Atari
Yars' Revenge	Atari 2600	March 24, 2010	Game Pack 001	Atari
Yie Ar Kung-Fu	Arcade	July 21, 2010	Game Pack 007	Konami

=== Additional themes ===
Along with the several pre-loaded themes available at the start in Game Room, Microsoft has added other themes in the game packs. Unlike many of the pre-loaded themes, which require the player to have attained a certain level in order to be used, these themes are available to be used immediately.

Theme name	Release date	Pack
Activision	May 5, 2010	Game Pack 003
Activision Showroom	November 24, 2010	Game Pack 012
Arctic	August 25, 2010	Game Pack 009
Atari Showroom	November 24, 2010	Game Pack 012
Caveman	September 22, 2010	Game Pack 010
Fantasy	May 19, 2010	Game Pack 004
Intellivision Showroom	November 24, 2010	Game Pack 012
Konami Showroom	November 24, 2010	Game Pack 012
Laundromat	November 24, 2010	Game Pack 012
Lost Temple	March 24, 2010	Game Pack 001
Old West	June 2, 2010	Game Pack 005
Pirate	July 14, 2010	Game Pack 007
Tiki	October 27, 2010	Game Pack 011

== See also ==
- Capcom Arcade Stadium, a similar service for arcade games developed by Capcom
