= Martial Champion =

1993 video game

- Japanese arcade flyer of Martial Champion
- Developer: Konami
- Publisher: Konami
- Composer: Junya Nakano
- Platforms: Arcade, PC Engine Super CD-ROM²
- Release: Arcade: NA/JP: 1993; PC Engine: JP: December 17, 1993
- Genre: Fighting
- Modes: Single-player, multiplayer
- Arcade system: Mystic Warriors-based hardware

Martial Champion (マーシャルチャンピオン) is a 1993 fighting game released for the arcades by Konami. It was Konami's third fighting game after the 1985 releases Yie Ar Kung-Fu and Galactic Warriors and the 1986 release Yie Ar Kung-Fu II, and their first release that came after the success of Capcom's 1991 arcade hit Street Fighter II.

== Gameplay ==
Screenshot of the arcade version

Martial Champion follows the same fighting game conventions established by Street Fighter II: the player's character fights against his or her opponent in best two-out-of-three matches in a single player tournament mode with the computer or against another human player. The player has a character roster of ten fighters to choose from, each with their own unique fighting style and special techniques.

The control layout differs from Street Fighter II and most other typical fighting games inspired by it. Martial Champion's control system is derived from the control system of Yie Ar Kung-Fu, but simplified to simply high, medium and low attacks, instead of having to press an attack button and a direction. One unique feature this arcade game has is stages that are similar to the "high-jump" stages seen in Capcom's later fighting games such as X-Men: Children of the Atom. Another unique feature is that certain characters carry weapons which can be disarmed by their opponent and used against them.

== Characters ==
There are ten playable fighters to select from. After the player defeats all ten opponents in the tournament mode (including a clone of their character), they face a final computer-controlled boss character. In the later localized worldwide versions, Chaos and Titi have their names switched (similar to the rotation of the boss characters' names in Street Fighter II, probably done to avoid associations with the word "titty"), with Chaos being a Chinese vampire and Titi being an Egyptian princess.

- Avu (アヴゥ) - a rotund Middle Eastern man armed with a scimitar. Billed as being from Saudi Arabia even though the displayed flag is Iraq's.
- Bobby (ボビー) - an eyepatched soldier from the United States similar to Guile.
- (British Hong Kong) Chaos (ケイオス) - a Chinese vampire from Hong Kong. Utilizes a pair of metal claws and his tongue in battle. Known in the international versions as "Titi".
- (France) Goldor (ゴルドー) - a French fighter utilizing a three-section staff or sansetsukon.
- Hoi (ホイ) - a Chinese martial artist from China.
- (Japan) Jin (陣) - a Japanese martial artist who was inspired by Ryu from the Street Fighter series and Lee from the Famicom and MSX versions of Yie Ar Kung-Fu.
- Mahamba (マハンバ) - a spear-wielding tribesman from Kenya.
- (United States) Racheal (レイチェル) - a blonde American female ninja.
- (Egypt) Titi (ティティ) - an Egyptian princess (the name derived from Nefertiti). Known in the US and World versions as "Chaos".
- Zen (禅) - a kabuki fighter from Japan.
- Salamander (サラマンダ) - the final boss and the tallest character in the game. He is unplayable and his move set contains techniques lifted from other characters.

== Home version ==
Martial Champion was exclusively ported to the PC Engine as a Super CD-ROM² release. Unlike the arcade version, which was released worldwide, the PC Engine version was released only in Japan. This version was later re-released for the Wii Virtual Console in Japan in May 2008.

Sprites and the background were shrunk, while the background became a still image instead of an animated one and the foreground objects and people on each stage were removed. The intro and outro are different compared to the arcade version's, but the original arcade intro that shows Jin and Goldor battling each other with instrumental music playing in the background is also included. In the PC Engine version, the other intro starts with the game's logo and a vocal song, then shows Jin putting on his headband and looks ahead of himself with birds flying by him, while Rachael and Goldor battle against each other. At the end, Goldor casts his Gol Wave toward the pitch-black darkness missing his target Rachael, while the final boss, Salamander, fades in from it.

== Reception ==
Reception

Review scores
Publication	Score
AllGame	(AC) 2.5/5
Famitsu	(PCE SCD-ROM²) 19/40
Joypad	(PCE SCD-ROM²) 73% (PCE SCD-ROM²) 72%
Super Game	(AC) 7/10

Award
Publication	Award
Gamest Mook (1998)	Annual Hit Game 29th (AC)

In Japan, Game Machine listed Martial Champion in their July 15, 1993 issue as being the second most-popular arcade game at the time. Play Meter listed Martial Champion to be the thirty-second most-popular arcade game at the time.

The PC Engine Super CD-ROM² version was met with mixed critical reception. Public reception was also mixed: readers of PC Engine Fan voted to give the PC Engine release a 19.8 out of 30 score in a poll. The Japanese book PC Engine Complete Guide 1987-1999 gave the PC Engine Super CD-ROM² release a positive analysis, stating that "it's sober, but it's surprisingly playable", but they pointed out that the sprite size were smaller than the arcade original and the background and effects were simplified but noted the addition of new elements such as hidden techniques.
