= Hardhead (disambiguation) =

Hardhead is a species of duck.

Hardhead may also refer to:

- Hardhead (Transformers), two characters in the Transformers series
- Hard Head, a 1988 arcade game
- Hard Head, South Georgia, a headland
- USS Hardhead (SS-365), a Balao-class submarine
- Mylopharodon conocephalus or hardhead, a cyprinid fish native to California
- Sciaenidae or hardheads, a family of fish
- Centaurea nigra or hardheads, a species of flowering plant in the daisy family
- Hardhead (coin), a 16th-century Scottish coin
- Hardhead catfish

== People with the surname ==
- John Hardhead, English MP

== See also ==
- Stubborn (disambiguation)
