= Skiing (disambiguation) =

Skiing is a means of transport using skis to glide on snow.

Skiing may also refer to:

- Sand skiing, a sport and form of skiing in which the skier rides down a sand dune on skis, using ski poles
- Water skiing, a surface water sport in which an individual is pulled behind a boat or a cable ski installation over a body of water, skimming the surface on two skis or one ski
- Skiing (magazine), a magazine published between 1948 and 2010
- Skiing (Atari 2600 video game), a 1980 video game
- Skiing (Intellivision video game), a 1980 video game
- Skiing (gaming), a move in video gaming
- "Skiing" (Not Going Out), a 2013 television episode
- "Ski-ing" (song), a song by George Harrison from Wonderwall Music
