= Intellivision Lives! =

1998 video game compilation

- Windows box art
- Developers: Intellivision Productions; Carl Mueller Jr; Quicksilver Software (Win/Mac); Realtime Associates (PS2, Xbox, GCN, DS)
- Publishers: WW: Intellivision Productions (Win, Mac); NA: Crave Entertainment (PS2, Xbox, GCN); EU: Play-It; NA: Virtual Play Games (DS)
- Platforms: Windows, Macintosh, GameCube, PlayStation 2, Xbox, Nintendo DS
- Release: December 18, 1998: Windows, Macintosh; NA: December 18, 1998 PlayStation 2; NA: November 20, 2003; PAL: September 24, 2004 Xbox; NA: February 2, 2004 GameCube; NA: November 4, 2004 Nintendo DS; NA: October 27, 2010
- Genre: Various
- Modes: Single-player, multiplayer

Intellivision Lives! is a video game compilation of over 60 Intellivision games, originally produced by Mattel Electronics and INTV Corporation between 1978 and 1990. Using original game code and software emulation, Intellivision Productions released the compilation on a Windows and Macintosh hybrid CD-ROM in December 1998. Additional versions were then released for the PlayStation 2, Xbox, and GameCube by Crave Entertainment. In 2010, Virtual Play Games released a Nintendo DS version.

Intellivision Productions later published Intellivision Rocks, which includes third-party games originally published by Activision and Imagic, as well as Intellivoice and ECS games.

== Overview ==
Some games, such as Advanced Dungeons & Dragons: Cloudy Mountain and Treasure of Tarmin use different titles to avoid the trademark. Licenses such as MLB, NFL, NBA, and The Electric Company were simply dropped from the titles. Also included were games never before released, such as King of the Mountain, Brickout, and Takeover.

In addition to the games, the Crave Entertainment releases have several unlockables, such as classic Intellivision commercials. The original Windows/Mac version is a resource for development history, unfinished prototypes, box art, overlays, instructions, hidden features, programmer biographies, and video interviews.

List of Available Games
Game Title	Genre	Win/Mac	PS2, Xbox, GCN	NDS	Notes
Bomb Squad	Arcade	No	Yes	Yes	
Buzz Bombers	Arcade	Yes	Yes	Yes	
Racing Cars	Arcade	Yes	Yes	No	Part of Triple Action on Win/Mac.
Night Stalker	Arcade	Yes	Yes	Yes	
Pinball	Arcade	Yes	Yes	Yes	
Shark! Shark!	Arcade	Yes	Yes	Yes	
SNAFU	Arcade	Yes	Yes	Yes	
Thin Ice	Arcade	Yes	Yes	Yes	Win/Mac version includes prototype Duncan's Thin Ice.
Vectron	Arcade	Yes	Yes	Yes	
Armor Battle	Combat & Sorcery	Yes	Yes	No	Two-player available with DS connect.
Adventure / Crown of Kings (Nintendo DS)	Combat & Sorcery	Yes	No	Yes	Prototype of originally released Advanced Dungeons & Dragons: Cloudy Mountain.
Minotaur	Combat & Sorcery	Yes	No	Yes	Prototype of originally released Advanced Dungeons & Dragons: Treasure of Tarmin.
Battle Tanks	Combat & Sorcery	Yes	Yes	No	Part of Triple Action on Win/Mac. Two-player only.
Biplanes	Combat & Sorcery	Yes	Yes	No	Part of Triple Action on Win/Mac. Two-player only.
B-17 Bomber	Combat & Sorcery	No	Yes	Yes	
Hover Force	Combat & Sorcery	Yes	Yes	Yes	
Sea Battle	Combat & Sorcery	Yes	Yes	No	Two-player available with DS connect.
Sub Hunt	Combat & Sorcery	Yes	Yes	Yes	
Thunder Castle	Combat & Sorcery	Yes	Yes	Yes	
Tower of Doom	Combat & Sorcery	Yes	Yes	Yes	
Utopia	Gaming & Strategy	Yes	Yes	No	Two-player available with DS connect.
Astrosmash	Space	Yes	Yes	Yes	
Space Armada	Space	Yes	Yes	Yes	
Space Battle	Space	Yes	Yes	Yes	
Space Hawk	Space	Yes	Yes	Yes	
Space Spartans	Space	Yes	Yes	Yes	
Star Strike	Space	Yes	Yes	Yes	
Auto Racing	Sports	Yes	Yes	No	Two-player available with DS connect.
Baseball	Sports	Yes	Yes	No	Two-player available with DS connect.
Basketball	Sports	Yes	Yes	No	Two-player available with DS connect.
Body Slam: Super Pro Wrestling	Sports	Yes	Yes	Yes	
Bowling	Sports	Yes	Yes	Yes	
Boxing	Sports	Yes	Yes	No	Two-player available with DS connect.
Chip Shot: Super Pro Golf	Sports	Yes	Yes	Yes	
Football	Sports	Yes	Yes	Yes	Two-player available with DS connect.
Golf	Sports	Yes	Yes	No	Two-player available with DS connect.
Hockey	Sports	Yes	Yes	No	Two-player available with DS connect.
Motocross	Sports	Yes	Yes	Yes	
Mountain Madness: Super Pro Skiing	Sports	Yes	Yes	Yes	
Skiing	Sports	Yes	Yes	Yes	US Ski Team Skiing
Slam Dunk: Super Pro Basketball	Sports	Yes	Yes	Yes	Requires two controllers.
Slap Shot: Super Pro Hockey	Sports	Yes	Yes	Yes	
Soccer	Sports	Yes	Yes	No	Two-player only.
Spiker: Super Pro Volleyball	Sports	Yes	Yes	Yes	
Stadium Mud Buggies	Sports	Yes	Yes	Yes	
Super Pro Decathlon	Sports	Yes	Yes	Yes	
Super Pro Football	Sports	Yes	Yes	Yes	Requires two controllers.
Tennis	Sports	Yes	Yes	Yes	Two-player only.
World Championship Baseball	Sports	Yes	Yes	Yes	Requires two controllers.
ABPA Backgammon	Gaming & Strategy	Yes	Yes	No	
Checkers	Gaming & Strategy	Yes	Yes	Yes	
Horse Racing	Gaming & Strategy	Yes	Yes	No	
Las Vegas Poker & Blackjack	Gaming & Strategy	Yes	Yes	Yes	Requires two controllers.
Las Vegas Roulette	Gaming & Strategy	Yes	Yes	Yes	Requires two controllers.
Reversi	Gaming & Strategy	Yes	Yes	Yes	
Royal Dealer	Gaming & Strategy	Yes	Yes	Yes	
USCF Chess	Strategy Network	Yes	No	No	
Crosswords	Kids	Yes	Yes	No	Part of Word Fun on Win/Mac. Requires two controllers.
Factor Fun	Kids	Yes	Yes	No	Part of Learning Fun I on Win/Mac. Requires two controllers.
Frog Bog	Kids	Yes	Yes	Yes	
Math Fun	Kids	Yes	No	No	
Math Master	Kids	Yes	Yes	Yes	Part of Learning Fun I on Win/Mac. Requires two controllers.
Memory Fun	Kids	Yes	Yes	No	Part of Learning Fun II on Win/Mac. Requires two controllers.
Sharp Shot	Kids	Yes	Yes	No	
Word Fun	Kids	Yes	No	No	
Word Hunt	Kids	Yes	Yes	No	Part of Learning Fun II on Win/Mac. Requires two controllers.
Word Rockets	Kids	Yes	Yes	No	Part of Learning Fun II on Win/Mac.
Air Strike	Unreleased	Yes	No	No	
Brickout	Unreleased	Yes	Yes	Yes	
Crazy Clones	Unreleased	Yes	No	No	
Deep Pockets: Pool & Billiards	Unreleased	Yes	Yes	Yes	
Demo Cartridge	Unreleased	Yes	Yes	No	
Go for the Gold	Unreleased	Yes	No	No	
Grid Shock	Unreleased	Yes	No	No	
Happy Holidays	Unreleased	Yes	No	No	Includes Santa's Helper, Easter Eggcitement and Trick or Treat.
Hard Hat	Unreleased	Yes	Yes	No	Two-player available with DS connect.
Hypnotic Lights	Unreleased	Yes	Yes	No	
King of the Mountain	Unreleased	Yes	No	No	
Land Battle	Unreleased	Yes	No	No	
Magic Carousel	Unreleased	No	Yes	No	
Meteor!	Unreleased	Yes	No	No	
Number Jumble	Unreleased	Yes	Yes	No	
Space Cadet	Unreleased	Yes	Yes	No	Two-player available with DS connect.
Super Soccer	Unreleased	Yes	No	No	
Takeover	Unreleased	Yes	Yes	No	Two-player available with DS connect.

== History and development ==
In June 1995, former Mattel Electronics programmers led by Keith Robinson started the Blue Sky Rangers Intellivision website. Blue Sky Rangers being a nickname given to the Mattel Electronics programmers in a TV Guide magazine article from the 1982 June 19 issue. The website provides the history of the Intellivsion games and credits the programmers and artists. It was well received with fans asking how the games can be played on their computers. In 1997, Intellivision Productions, Inc. was formed by former Mattel Electronics programmers Keith Robinson and Stephen Roney with the purchase of the rights to the Intellivision and its games.

At the same time, a student in Michigan named Carl Mueller Jr. was independently working on reverse engineering the Intellivision. With the help of Intellivision ROM dumps from Sean Kelly and then William Moeller and Scott Nudds, Mueller Jr. was able to create the first Intellivision emulator that plays the games on a modern computer. Kelly was fortunate to have two Intellivision prototype cartridges with standard 8-bit EPROMs as opposed to the more complex memory mapped ROMs used by ordinary cartridges. Moeller and Nudds were able to dump the Intellivision embedded executive control software and graphic ROMs, as well as build a cartridge reader to dump any Intellivision cartridge.

Mueller Jr.'s MS-DOS emulator and a Macintosh emulator created by Intellivision Productions' Steve Roney would be used in the free Intellipack downloads so anyone could play select Intellivision games on their computers for the first time in 1997. The Intellivision for PC/Mac Volume 2 download, also of 1997, was the first release of Deep Pockets Super Pro Billiards, the last game programmed for the Intellivision in 1990, but unreleased by INTV Corporation. They would also be used to play the original Intellivision games in the Intellivision Lives! PC/Mac CD-ROM edition released in 1998 by Intellivision Productions.

== PC and Macintosh system requirements ==
The PC/Mac edition was produced with Macromedia Director and may not be compatible with modern operating systems. The QuickTime videos, emulators, and Intellivision ROM image files are directly accessible on the CD-ROM.

The Intellivision Lives! PC/Mac v1.0 system requirements:

- PC: Pentium 90 MHz, Windows 95, 8MB RAM, 8x CD-ROM, QuickTime v3.0 or better
- Mac: Power Macintosh, OS7.5, 100 MHz, 16MB RAM, 8x CD-ROM, QuickTime

The Intellivision Lives! PC/Mac v1.1 system requirements:

- PC: Pentium 266 MHz, Windows 95/98/Me/2000/XP, 32M RAM, 8X CD-ROM, 16-bit DirectX compatible sound & video cards, DirectX 7 or better, QuickTime v3.0 or better
- Mac: Power Macintosh, OS 8/9/X, 120 MHz, 32M RAM, 8X CD-ROM, QuickTime

Controller functions are mapped to the computer keyboard; an extended keyboard is required to access both left and right Intellivision controllers. With Macintosh, USB game controllers could be used indirectly with a joystick to keyboard mapper utility. For PC, Intellivision Productions promoted the Gravis GamePad Pro game controller (game port version). The MS-DOS emulator, directly accessible on the CD-ROM, also supported original Intellivision controllers through the INTV2PC Hand Controller Interface. INTV2PC is a parallel port adapter that accepts original Intellivision hand controllers. Although this feature is not promoted, it is documented in the INTVPC files on the CD-ROM. Modern intellivision emulators and USB controller adapters have since become available, compatible with the Intellivision Lives rom image files.

To play the games using real Intellivision controllers, Intellivision Productions supported the use of a device called the Intellicart. The Intellicart is a RAM cartridge with an RS-232 interface that can accept a copy of an Intellivision ROM image file from a computer. Rather than play the Intellivision Lives! games via an emulator, they can be played on a real Intellivision through an Intellicart. Since that time, modern Intellivision flash memory cartridges have been made which achieves the same result.

In 2002, an updated Intellivision Lives! PC/Mac v1.1 was made available by Intellivision Productions. Those that bought the original could upgrade for a nominal fee. It added Windows 98/ME/2000/XP support with a native Windows emulator supporting DirectX sound, video, and game controllers.

== Modern video game consoles ==
Realtime Associates developed the video game console editions published by Crave Entertainment for PlayStation 2 (2003), Xbox (2004), and GameCube (2004). In these versions, the games are accessed from a 3D "overworld" set in a circa 1980s pizza parlor; an inaccurate representation as the Intellivision games were originally designed for a home console. Games were also re-organised by genres rather than the original Mattel Electronics Networks used in the PC/Mac edition. Some games require two controllers, even to play single player.

In 2010, Virtual Play Games published Intellivision Lives! for the Nintendo DS handheld system, also developed by Realtime Associates. It features wireless, multiplayer support using a single game card. The Nintendo DS's touch screen emulates the Intellivision's 12-button keypad including an overlay image for each game. The Nintendo DS lacks a 16 direction pad used by some Intellivision games. This limitation was overcome, in Vectron for example, by mapping directional inputs to the touch screen. Only 10,000 copies of the Nintendo DS edition were ever released.

The Xbox version of Intellivision Lives! is fully forward compatible with the Xbox 360 console, and in 2008, Intellivision Lives! became available for purchase as a download through Xbox Live Game Marketplace's Xbox Originals.

== Intellivision Rocks ==
Intellivision Rocks is the PC-only sequel to the original PC version of Intellivision Lives!. As with Intellivision Lives!, Intellivision Rocks is a collection of games which were originally found on the Intellivision, presented in emulated form. It mainly features 3rd-party games from Activision and Imagic. In addition, several unreleased games are included.

== Reception ==
Reception

Review scores
Publication	Score
GameSpot	6.8/10
IGN	6.0/10

IGN said that Intellivision Lives! is "still blocky after all these years, sure...but these games really need the controller." GameSpot editors said that although the controller emulation is a little hard to handle, the collection does a fine job in delivering classic Intellivision games.
