= City Bomber =

1987 video game

- Developer: Konami
- Publisher: Konami
- Platform: Arcade
- Release: 1987
- Genre: Vehicular combat
- Mode: Single-player
- Arcade system: Konami GX400

City Bomber (Note: Japanese: シティボンバー, Hepburn: Shiti Bonbā) is a 1987 vehicular combat video game developed and published by Konami for arcades. It was released in Japan and North America in November 1987.

== Gameplay ==
The game's description clarifies that the player must "take control of Cat Burglar 306 after stealing the haul from a corrupt casino, and try to escape from the gang that's after you."

In order to escape, the player must reach checkpoints within a specified amount of time. The last stage of the game shows the car boarding an airplane that flies away. At the start of the game, the player's car can shoot missiles at enemy vehicles and is also able to jump over enemies or obstacles. When some enemy cars are destroyed, power-ups are released that augment the car's abilities. Missiles improve the destructive power of the car's weaponry, wings extend the car's jumping distance, rocket boosters speed up the car and buzzsaws allow the car to ram obstacles without damage for a short time.

Collisions with other cars are not generally harmful to the player, although they may slow down the car. Oil slicks dropped by enemies will spin out the car and slow it down significantly. Collisions with obstacles or falling off the course will destroy the player's car. While the player has an unlimited supply of cars, crashes will cost the player time and the new car will lose all previously-collected power-ups. If the player does not reach the checkpoint (shown by a map on the left side of the screen) in time, the game is over.

Points are scored by destroying enemy cars, with bonus points awarded at the end of each course for the amount of time remaining.

== Reception ==
In Japan, Game Machine listed City Bomber on their January 15, 1988 issue as being the twentieth most-successful table arcade unit of the month.

== Legacy ==
City Bomber was released as part of Microsoft's Game Room for the Xbox 360 and Windows computers on August 25, 2010. Hamster Corporation released the game as part of their Arcade Archives series for the Nintendo Switch and PlayStation 4 in December 2024.

== Soundtrack ==
The game's soundtrack was produced by Konami Kukeiha Club and published by King Records on July 21, 1989 as part of "Konami Game Music Collection Vol.0" along with additional soundtracks from MX5000, The Main Event, The Final Round, Gang Busters, and Devastators.
