= Konami Classics Series: Arcade Hits =

2007 video game

- North American cover art
- Developer: M2
- Publisher: Konami
- Platform: Nintendo DS
- Release: JP: March 15, 2007; NA: March 27, 2007; EU: October 26, 2007; AU: October 29, 2007
- Modes: Single-player, multiplayer

Konami Classics Series: Arcade Hits, released as Konami Arcade Collection in Japan and Konami Arcade Classics in Europe and Oceania, is a 2007 video game compilation developed and published by Konami for the Nintendo DS.

== Lineup ==
The compilation features the following games:

Titles included in Konami Classics Series: Arcade Hits
Title	Release
Scramble	1981
Tutankham	1982
Pooyan	1982
Time Pilot	1982
Track and Field	1983
Roc 'N Rope	1983
Super Basketball	1984
Circus Charlie	1984
Road Fighter	1984
TwinBee	1985
Yie Ar Kung-Fu	1985
Shao-Lin's Road	1985
Gradius	1985
Rush'n Attack	1985
Contra	1987

When Tutankham and Super Basketball were released in the U.S., they originally kept their original names. Horror Maze and Basketball are names exclusive to this collection. It is unknown why the games' names were changed. This compilation also marks the first North American appearance of the original TwinBee arcade game in any form.

== Other features ==
- The compilations also includes extensive historical information and options for each game. Additionally, if the system's language is set to Japanese, all the games will run in their Japanese versions, although even then, Tutankham, Hyper Olympic, Super Basketball, TwinBee, and Green Beret still use the Horror Maze, Track and Field, Basketball, RainbowBell, and Rush 'n Attack names respectively in the Western version. Menus and text will also be changed to Japanese. In addition, while the differences between the Japanese and international versions of most of the games are minimal (with Contra displaying its Japanese ateji-based logo in the Japanese setting), Gradius is the most notable exception. When the DS is set to any language other than Japanese, the European version (still called Gradius in this compilation) is seen, which features a different title screen, higher difficulty, lacks the separate "START" screen, and with "Option" renamed "Multiple".
- The "Morning Music" can be heard during the intro. The "Morning Music" is the boot-up music for Konami's Bubble System, which was a hardware Konami used for their arcade games in 1985. Gradius and TwinBee are the two games in this collection that originally ran on the Bubble System.
- While the original arcade version of Track and Field featured "Chariots of Fire" by Vangelis, in this version, the theme is retained, but has been altered into a non-copyright infringing rendition presumably due to licensing issues. Additionally some music from Rush'n Attack has also been altered.

== Reception ==
Reception

Aggregate score
Aggregator	Score
GameRankings	76% (based on 22 reviews)

Review scores
Publication	Score
1Up.com	C+
GameSpot	7/10
GameZone	8.2/10
IGN	8/10

Reception for Konami Classics Series: Arcade Hits has been slightly positive, garnering an average score of 76% on Game Rankings. Complaints have revolved around either some of the included games simply (in GameSpot's words) "aren't really worth playing" or the visuals being "squashed" or "jittery". 1UP was even more critical of the included game library, considering it dated and lame. Furthermore, some sites such as IGN or VGRC lamented the lack of Nintendo Wi-Fi Connection support.

== See also ==
- Konami Antiques MSX Collection
- Konami Arcade Classics - also titled Konami 80's Arcade Gallery and Konami 80's AC Special.
- Konami Classics for Xbox 360
- Konami Collector's Series: Arcade Advanced
- List of Konami games
