= Triple Action =

1981 video game

- Developer(s): Mattel Electronics
- Publisher(s): Mattel Electronics
- Designer(s): Rich O'Keefe
- Platform(s): Intellivision
- Release: October 15, 1981
- Genre(s): Action
- Mode(s): Multiplayer

Triple Action is an action video game produced by Mattel Electronics for its Intellivision video game system in 1981. The game actually includes three separate games—racing, tank combat and flying—where two players compete against each other for the best score.

== History ==
During the game's development, it was known internally as Some of Theirs, as many of the games proposed for the title were clones of games produced by Mattel's main competitor, Atari. The limited amount of memory available lowered the number of proposed games from six to five. Ultimately, three games remained after an internal review by the company's attorneys determined that two of the games, a Breakout-style game and a Pong-style game, could have prompted a lawsuit from Atari. Prior to release, the game was called 3-in-1 Arcade before being changed to Triple Action.

== Gameplay ==
Triple Action contains three separate games: "Battle Tanks", "Car Racing" and "Biplanes". Players choose the desired game from an on-screen menu, then choose from available options for that particular game.

In "Battle Tanks", players maneuver their tanks around the battlefield, with the first player to shoot their opponent 15 times being declared the winner. The game's options adjust the range of the players' shots and can enable them to ricochet off of obstacles. If ricocheting shots are selected, players may be hit by their own shots, which would score points for the opponent.

"Car Racing" is a race that spans 100 miles (160 km), with each player on a separate section of road. Players must dodge traffic in order to reach the finish line before their opponent. Players can adjust the amount of vehicle traffic prior to the start of the race.

The object of "Biplanes" is to score 15 points by shooting down the balloon or the enemy's biplane. Before the game begins, players can choose between short-range and long-range shots.

== Reception ==
Triple Action was favorably reviewed in 1982 by Video magazine where it was described as "a completely legitimate effort" on behalf of Mattel to create another tank game after the success of Armor Battle. Although the tank and air-combat portions of the game were characterized respectively as "pure arcade action" and "delightful in many respects", the cars portion was dismissed by reviewers as "nothing major". Triple Action would go on to be honored with a Certificate of Merit in the category of "Best Video Game Audiovisual Effects" a year later at the 4th annual Arkie Awards.

== Legacy ==
Triple Action is included in the Intellivision Lives! compilation for computers and video game consoles, including the PlayStation 2 and GameCube. In June 2010, Microsoft made the game available through its Game Room service for Xbox 360 and Microsoft Windows.
