= Galactic Warriors =

1985 video game

- Developer: Konami
- Publisher: Konami
- Platform: Arcade
- Release: JP: November 1985
- Genre: Fighting
- Modes: Single-player, multiplayer
- Arcade system: Bubble System

Galactic Warriors (Note: Japanese: ギャラクティックウォーリアーズ, Hepburn: Gyarakutikku Wōriāzu) is a 1985 fighting video game developed and published by Konami for arcades. It was released in Japan in November 1985. It is Konami's second fighting game released after their 1985 arcade-hit Yie Ar Kung-Fu. It was ported to Microsoft's Game Room service in 2010. Hamster Corporation released the game as part of their Arcade Archives series for the Nintendo Switch and PlayStation 4, as well as their Arcade Archives 2 series for the Nintendo Switch 2, PlayStation 5 and Xbox Series X/S.

== Gameplay ==
The game is controlled with an 8-way joystick and three buttons: the attack button, the guard button, and the weapon selection button. There are six stages, each with different themes and environmental effects based on gravity. Some other features introduced in Galactic Warriors that were used in later fighting games include block damage, air-blocking, the ability to shoot/throw projectiles, the ability to execute multiple attacks while airborne, a modern health bar (as opposed to a health meter with notches like in Capcom's Mega Man series that made their debut two years later), the ability to switch between armed and unarmed and attacks of varying levels of strength.

Another feature introduced at the time allows the player to choose one of three Mechas, each with their own movesets: Samson, a medium-sized robot equipped with a sword; Gaea, a female-presenting robot armed with breast projectiles; and Poseidon, a robust robot with an extendable limb. When one is selected, the player must use it to destroy other robots in each planet. Other than the playable characters, there are several non-playable characters and bosses with original designs and unique movesets. In the final battle, the player will face the same character he or she chose. After defeating the final opponent, the game goes back to the beginning and the player's chosen character and the opponents will have an extra weapon.

Unlike in the single player modes of other fighting games, Galactic Warriors lacks continues and gives the player a number of lives similar to ones in some other genres from platform games to beat 'em ups. When the player loses all of his or her lives, the game is over and it returns to attract mode. In each battle, the timer starts at one minute and thirty seconds, and when it drops to zero before any player is knocked out, the player with the fewest damage wins. Players can monitor this by looking at their life bars. At the start of the fight, both players life bars are blue, but as the fight progresses, the life bar changes to a pink color for the player with the least amount of health remaining or most damage taken. Therefore, if a player's life bar is pink when/if time runs out, that player will lose.

The BGM is often thrown in television programs and other types of media on the music side, and its soundtrack was included with its arranged versions in two albums: Konami GAME MUSIC VOL.2 and KONAMI GM HITS FACTORY I.
