= ABPA Backgammon =

1979 video game

- Developer(s): APh Technological Consulting
- Publisher(s): Mattel Electronics; Sears
- Designer(s): Kevin J. Miller
- Platform(s): Intellivision
- Release: November 1979
- Genre(s): Board game
- Mode(s): Single-player

ABPA Backgammon is a backgammon video game for Intellivision (ABPA stands for American Backgammon Players Association). This was one of the original four launch titles for the Intellivision system.

== Legacy ==
Backgammon is included is in the Intellivision Lives! game package for personal computers and game consoles.
