= Labyrinth Runner =

1988 video game

- Developer: Konami
- Publisher: Konami
- Platform: Arcade
- Release: JP: January 1988; EU: 1988
- Genre: Run and gun
- Modes: Single-player, multiplayer

Labyrinth Runner (Note: Japanese: ラビリンスランナー, Hepburn: Rabirinsu Rannā) is a 1988 run and gun video game developed and published by Konami for arcades. It was released in Japan in January 1988 and Europe the same year as Trick Trap.

The game was released as part of Microsoft's Game Room service. Hamster Corporation released the game as part of their Arcade Archives series for the Nintendo Switch and PlayStation 4, as well as their Arcade Archives 2 series for the Nintendo Switch 2, PlayStation 5 and Xbox Series X/S in January 2026.

== Gameplay ==
The player controls a prince who aims to rescue Princess Papaya of Vegetaria from the Devil. The player navigates levels on foot while defeating enemies with ammunition, bombs and an acquirable laser weapon which the player can freely switch between. Pressing both buttons allows the player to use power-ups and damage enemies on the entire screen. After the time limit is passed, an immortal enemy attempts to kill the player.
