= Kitten Kaboodle =

1988 video game

- Arcade flyer
- Developer: Konami
- Publisher: Konami
- Platform: Arcade
- Release: JP: August 1988; WW: 1988
- Genre: Action
- Modes: Single-player, multiplayer
- Arcade system: Konami GX400

Kitten Kaboodle (Note: Japanese: にゃんにゃんパニック, Hepburn: Niyannyan Panikku) is a 1988 action video game developed and published by Konami for arcades. It was released in Japan in August 1988 and outside Japan the same year. It was released for the Xbox 360 as part of Microsoft's Game Room service. Hamster Corporation released the game as part of their Arcade Archives series for the Nintendo Switch and PlayStation 4 in February 2025.

== Gameplay ==
Kitten Kaboodle is a top-down action game where players control two kittens who aim to find hidden keys in levels occupied by enemies and obstacles. The player can jump over enemies and kick blocks in their direction to defeat them, which may occasionally yield a key, while collecting cash to purchase power-ups. Three blocks with symbols such as fire, dynamite, a crown and a stopwatch can be connected to activate effects such as burning enemies within a chosen radius, blowing up enemies, making the player character invincible and stopping time. Between levels, a shop, slot machine or Whac-A-Mole mini game will appear for players to spend coins and/or score extra points. A boss stage occurs every 5 levels, where both the boss and the player aim to defeat each other by throwing bombs.
