= TwinBee =

1985 video game

- Japanese arcade flyer
- Developer: Konami
- Publishers: WW: Konami; JP: Sharp (X68000); WW: Nintendo (GBA/3D Classics)
- Composers: Shigeru Fukutake; Yoshinori Sasaki
- Series: TwinBee
- Platforms: Arcade, Famicom, MSX, X68000, Famicom Disk System, mobile phone, Game Boy Advance
- Release: February 1985: Arcade; JP: February 1985 Famicom; JP: January 4, 1986 MSX; JP: May 25, 1986; EU: 1986 X68000; JP: February 1988 Famicom Disk System; JP: March 11, 1988 Mobile; JP: 2003 Game Boy Advance; JP: May 21, 2004
- Genre: Scrolling shooter
- Modes: Single-player, multiplayer
- Arcade system: Bubble System, Konami GX400

TwinBee (Note: Japanese: ツインビー, Hepburn: TsuinBī) is a 1985 vertically scrolling shooter developed and published by Konami as an arcade video game. Along with Sega's Fantasy Zone (1986), it is credited as an early archetype of the "cute 'em up" subgenre. It was the first game to run on Konami's Bubble System hardware. TwinBee was ported to the Family Computer and MSX in 1986, and has been included in numerous compilations released in later years. The original arcade game was released outside Japan for the first time as part of the Nintendo DS compilation Konami Classics Series: Arcade Hits. A mobile phone version with edited graphics was released for Japanese i-mode mobile phones in 2003.

Various TwinBee sequels were released for the arcade and home console markets following the original game, some of which spawned audio drama and anime adaptations in Japan.

== Gameplay ==
TwinBee can be played by up to two players simultaneously. The player controls a cartoon-like anthropomorphic spacecraft, with Player 1 taking control of TwinBee, the titular ship, while Player 2 controls WinBee. The game control consists of an eight-way joystick and two buttons: one for shooting enemies in the air and the other for dropping bombs to ground enemies (similarly to Xevious).

The player's primary power-ups are bells that can be uncovered by shooting at the floating clouds where they're hidden. If the player continues shooting the bell after it appears, it will change into one of four other colors: the regular yellow bells only grant bonus points, the white bell will upgrade the player's gun into a twin cannon, the blue bell increases the player's speed (for up to five speed levels), the green bell will allow the player to create image copies of its ship for additional firepower, and the red bell will provide the player's ship a barrier that allows it to sustain more damage. The green and red bells cannot be combined. Other power-ups can also be retrieved from ground enemies such as an alternate bell that gives the player's ship a three-way gun, a star which eliminates all on-screen enemies.

As with other games of the same genre, getting shot by a single enemy bullet will cause the player to lose a life, but if the bullet only strikes either side of the ship instead, the player's ship will only lose one of its arms. If the player's ship loses both arms, it will lose the ability to throw bombs and the player must wait for an ambulance to arrive. The player must navigate their ship to the ambulance to repair their arms. If the player's ship loses both arms for the second time, no ambulance will arrive.

If two players are playing at the same time, they can align their ships vertically or horizontally together to perform more powerful attacks.

== Ports ==
TwinBee was later ported to MSX and the Family Computer. The Famicom version was re-released only in Japan under the Famicom Mini label for the Game Boy Advance.

This game was officially released for the first time outside Japan as part of the Konami Classics Series: Arcade Hits for the Nintendo DS in March 2007, under the name RainbowBell in North America, although the TwinBee name was restored for the European release.

TwinBee was released in Japan on August 10, 2011, and in other regions on September 22 for the Nintendo 3DS as a part of the 3D Classics series. This release was featured (amongst other games from the Nintendo Entertainment System and Super NES) to be released for the 3DS on a tech demo called Classic Games at E3 2010.

The arcade version of TwinBee was made available on Microsoft's Game Room service for its Xbox 360 console and for Windows-based PCs on December 1, 2010.

The MSX version was re-released for Windows via Project EGG by D4 Enterprise on August 19, 2014.

Hamster Corporation released the game as part of their Arcade Archives series for the PlayStation 4 in 2015 and for the Nintendo Switch in 2019.

The Famicom port was re-released via the Nintendo Classics service in November 2018 worldwide, with an SP version titled TwinBee: A Second Helping of Donburi Island! released in June 2019.

== Reception ==
In Japan, Game Machine listed TwinBee as the third most successful table arcade unit of March 1985.

The version of Twinbee for Nintendo 3DS received a total of 68/100 on Metacritic, which is mixed to positive, with an average user score of 7.3.

Gamest's video game reference "The Best Game 2" included the arcade version in its "The Best Game" category. The reviewer RED commended the two-player cooperative attacks and dynamic item effects. RED identified the green bell "duplication" mechanic as a precursor to Gradius's option system, characterizing it as important for understanding power-up system development in shooting games. The ambulance feature was noted as distinctive, though RED criticized the high difficulty, stating that "power-up loss upon death significantly impedes game progression."

Family Computer Magazine readers rated the game 23.46 out of 30 points in their survey. The magazine's "Complete Famicom Cartridge Catalog" supplement from May 10, 1991, noted that simultaneous two-player gameplay was uncommon at the time, while praising the cooperative attacks and collaborative gameplay elements.

MSX Magazine's review drew comparisons to Majou Densetsu, awarding the game four out of five stars with the assessment that "while inferior to the arcade version, the overall execution quality remains good."

== Legacy ==
In 2022, Konami organised Konami Action & Shooting Contest to encourage indie developers to make games based on some of its classic series, including TwinBee. Hosted by the Shueisha Game Creator's Camp and Tokyo Game Show, Ken Niimura won the rights from Konami to develop the game through the competition; his team's proposal was named TwinBee Loop!: The Mystery of the Planet of Light and Darkness!!.

A promotional web manga 40th Anniversary of the Home Console Version of TwinBee, Nami-chan is playing TwinBee on the Famicom, one of them makes a cameo as TwinBee and Winbee shoot at Onion Head, the boss in the first stage.
