= Bubble System =

Konami arcade board

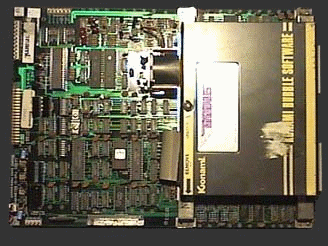
- A Konami Bubble System board with the Gradius Bubble Software cartridge connected.
- Developer: Konami
- Released: 1985
- CPU: Motorola 68000 @ 10 MHz

The Bubble System is a modular arcade system board designed by Konami and used across several arcade games in 1985.

Konami announced coin-op arcade video games for the system in January 1985. The Bubble System introduced a unique new form of data storage for arcade-style video games. It used bubble memory cartridges enabling an operator to swap games easily.

Konami used a modified version of their new G400 BIOS for this project. The main CPU was a Motorola 68000 at 10 MHz. There was a separate Zilog Z80 for sound control, which drove two AY-3-8910s, a custom Konami SCC (K005289), and a Sanyo VLM5030 speech synthesizer. It had a Scramble wiring harness.

Bubble Software can be identified by its booting sequence. First, a synthesized voice speaks the phrase "Presented by Konami. Getting ready…", followed by a countdown from fifty (which often ends before reaching zero). The screen then starts displaying video and a screen with the text "WARMING UP NOW - PRESENTED BY KONAMI", accompanied with a second countdown timer and a small musical tune (called the "Morning Music") appears. The reason this was implemented was because bubble memory must be heated to around 30–40 °C (86–104 °F) for it to work properly, and the game must be copied from the bubble memory into RAM, before it can be run. Despite what the screen says, the heating process takes place during the voice-based countdown stage (which is of variable length and is temperature-dependent), while the loading process happens during the (fixed-length) on-screen countdown stage.

Unfortunately for Konami, the Bubble System became a commercial failure because it was considerably more expensive than ROM chip-based boards and extremely sensitive to electromagnetic fields that could render the game unplayable. All games on this system were eventually ported to standard ROM chips, and it was discontinued.

Since bubble memory was made obsolete by improvements in hard disk drive technology, a still working Bubble System is hard to find nowadays. But still, Konami has made homages to the Bubble System in several games; with the Morning Music being one of the playable tracks in Keyboardmania and NOSTALGIA, and the intro of Konami Classics Series: Arcade Hits featuring the song too.

== Bubble System games ==
- TwinBee
- Gradius (ported to ROM chips as Nemesis for overseas distribution)
- Galactic Warriors
- Konami RF2 (ported to ROM chips as Konami GT for overseas distribution)
