= Space Hawk =

1982 video game

- Developer: Mattel Electronics
- Publishers: Mattel Electronics; Sears
- Designer: Bill Fisher
- Platform: Intellivision
- Release: NA: April 19, 1982; EU: 1982
- Genre: Multidirectional shooter
- Mode: Single-player

Space Hawk is a multidirectional shooter released by Mattel for its Intellivision console in 1982. The game is a re-worked version of a previously planned clone of Asteroids in which the player, in a rocket-powered space suit, is drifting in space and shooting down or avoiding targets, including the titular hawks.

Space Hawk was also released by Sears for the "Super Video Arcade", its private-label version of the Intellivision console.

== Gameplay ==
The object of Space Hawk is to survive as long as possible while drifting in the middle of outer space. The player is equipped with a rocket-powered space suit and a "gas blaster" for protection. Three user-selectable settings control the player's interaction with the game. The blaster can fire single shots manually or can be set to automatic rapid fire. The player's movement can include or ignore inertia. Lastly, the rotation of the space suit can either be instantaneous (by pushing the controller in the desired direction) or gradual (by holding the controller to the left or right until the desired attitude is reached). Each setting can be changed during the game as often as desired.

The player is attacked by large and small mechanical hawks, which must be shot three times before they are destroyed. There are also gas bubbles and comets that can be shot or avoided. In later stages, space amoebas appear that are impervious to the player's weapons and can only be avoided. A collision with any obstacle will cost the player one life. As a last resort, the player's space suit is equipped with a hyperspace function, that will randomly relocate the player to another section of space; however, the player loses points when the hyperspace function is used. Also, from time to time, the player may encounter invisible black holes that will trigger hyperspace automatically.

The player starts with a score of 500 points. Points are earned whenever targets are destroyed and lost whenever the player is destroyed or enters hyperspace. As score increases, multipliers are applied and difficulty increases.

== Development ==
Space Hawk was the second attempt at crafting a version of Atari's popular arcade game Asteroids. After company lawyers demanded changes for fear of a lawsuit, the first re-working became Astrosmash. Programmer Bill Fisher began working with the previous prototype with the intent of developing a game similar to Asteroids while being different enough to avoid legal action.

During development, a bug was discovered that would randomly trigger hyperspace even when the corresponding button on the controller was not pressed. It was determined that simultaneously pressing the controller disc in a certain direction and using the controller's side action buttons was being interpreted by the console as pressing the key on the keypad that activated hyperspace. Ultimately, as the bug could not be removed completely, the developers added the "black holes" to explain why the player would sometimes jump to hyperspace at random.

== Legacy ==
The game was re-released as part of the Intellivision Lives! collection for personal computers and newer-generation game consoles, and in March 2010, Space Hawk was one of the launch titles for Microsoft's now-defunct Game Room service on its Xbox 360 console and on Games for Windows Live.
