= Sharp Shot =

1982 video game

- Developer: Mattel Electronics
- Publisher: Mattel Electronics
- Designer: Frank Evans
- Platform: Intellivision
- Release: October 28, 1982
- Genre: Action
- Modes: Single player, Multiplayer

Sharp Shot is a video game released by Mattel for its Intellivision system in 1982. Specifically marketed towards younger children, Sharp Shot is a collection of four simple games where the object is to score points by correctly timing shots at various targets.

== Gameplay ==
Sharp Shot consists of four separate games: Football Passing, Space Gunner, Submarine and Maze Shoot. In each game, players must push the controller's action button at the correct time in order to successfully connect with the target. In the case of Football Passing, for example, points are scored for a successful forward pass, with no points scored if the receiver fails to catch the ball. Players do not control the movement of their on-screen character, and must press the action button when a target is in range.

Each game is timed, with players attempting to score as many points as possible within the given time limit. The "Space Gunner" and "Maze" games are the only games out of the four that allows two players to play simultaneously; the other two games require players to alternate turns, with separate score totals maintained for both players. Player 1s score appears in the top left, and Player 2s appears in the top right in all four games.

== Development ==
The games that would become Sharp Shot were originally used for an early version of interactive television known as TV POWWW, where home players called into local television stations to play for prizes. Players controlled the game by saying "Pow!" when they wanted to shoot the targets. Later versions of the TV POWWW software were written by the staff at APh Technological Consulting. The company hired by Mattel Electronics to develop the hardware and software for Intellivision.

As Mattel was contracted to purchase a certain number of games from APh, the company decided to package the four games together as a simple game for younger children to play. While Mattel's marketing department agreed to promote the game, one of Mattel's vice presidents criticized its simplicity and consumers complained that it was graphically no different than earlier games for the rival Atari 2600. Ultimately, the game was released with a label reiterating that the intended audience was young children.

== Legacy ==
Sharp Shot was re-released as part of the Intellivision Lives! collection for personal computers and game consoles. The game was also released on Microsoft's Game Room service.
