= Scooter Shooter =

1985 arcade video game

- Developer: Konami
- Publisher: Konami
- Platform: Arcade
- Release: JP: 1985
- Genre: Scrolling shooter
- Modes: Single-player, multiplayer

Scooter Shooter is a horizontally scrolling shooter released in arcades by Konami in 1985. One may play against either the computer or another human.

== Legacy ==
Scooter Shooter was made available by Microsoft for its Game Room service for the Xbox 360 and Games for Windows – Live in July 2010.
