= Shao-lin's Road =

1985 video game

- Japanese arcade flyer
- Developer: Konami
- Publisher: Konami
- Platforms: Arcade, Commodore 64, Amstrad CPC, ZX Spectrum
- Release: Arcade: JP: April 1985; NA: August 1985; Commodore 64: EU: 1986; ZX Spectrum: EU: 1986; Amstrad CPC: EU: 1987
- Genre: Beat 'em up
- Modes: Single-player, multiplayer
- Arcade system: Konami 6809

Shao-lin's Road (Note: Japanese: 少林寺への道, Hepburn: Shōrinji E No Michi), released in North America as Kicker, is a 1985 beat 'em up video game developed and published by Konami for arcades. It was released in Japan in April 1985 and in North America in August 1985. The game was commercially successful, becoming a chart hit in the arcades. It was ported to several early home computers and has also been featured in classics compilations Konami Arcade Classics for the PlayStation in 1998 and Konami Classics Series: Arcade Hits for the Nintendo DS in 2007.

The game was also released as a download-only title as part of Microsoft's Game Room for the Xbox 360 and Microsoft Windows in 2010. Hamster Corporation released the game as part of their Arcade Archives series for the Nintendo Switch and PlayStation 4 in 2023.

== Plot ==
Players take control of Wanpyou (ワンピョウ) (renamed Kicker in Kicker, renamed Lee in other ports), who has just mastered the secret of Chin-style Shaolin martial arts. He then encounters the Triad Yamucha Gang (ヤムチャ団), also responsible for the assassination of his master Raochuu (ラオチュー), and is trapped within their Jaken Temple (邪拳寺). He attempts to escape and enact revenge with his new-found skills.

== Gameplay ==
The controls consist of a four-position joystick and two buttons. The goal of each level ("step") is to defeat a set number of enemies, as indicated by an on-screen meter. The player can move left or right, jump between platforms/floors, and attack with various jumping/kicking strikes.

Enemies emerge from doorways to attack the player; some fight hand-to-hand, while others throw projectiles. Defeating a green-clad enemy causes a colored sphere to appear, which grants the player one of three power-up weapons for a few seconds if caught: a meteor hammer, the ability to throw fireballs, or a ball that orbits the player and damages any enemy it touches. Food items occasionally float across the screen and can be struck for bonus points.

The player can take three hits from enemies or their projectiles and continue fighting, but a fourth hit costs one life. Each step is divided into two parts; the second half includes a fight against a boss character, who requires five hits to defeat and may have a special attack technique. Once all enemies in either half of a step are defeated, the player earns bonus points based on the number of hits taken in that half and the damage meter is fully restored.

The game includes a total of five different step designs, which repeat in a cycle with increasing difficulty. Once all lives are lost, the game ends.

== Reception and legacy ==
In Japan, Game Machine listed Shao-lin's Road on their June 15, 1985 issue as being the twenty-second most-successful table arcade unit of the month. In Europe, Shao-lin's Road was marketed as a follow-up to Yie Ar Kung-Fu and became a commercial success in arcades. The Legend of Kage, released by Taito later the same year, was influenced by Shao-lin's Road.

== Records ==
The current arcade world record is held by Estel Goffinet scoring 50,000,000 points on June 28 of 2014 in just under 32 hours of play. The score is listed in the Twin Galaxies database.

The current arcade world record for "Extreme Settings" is held by Joe Hudak scoring 5,054,500 points on September 17 of 2018. The score is listed in the Twin Galaxies database.

Adrian Rodriguez holds the official world record of 13,007,800 in the MAME platform on Twin Galaxies from 2018.
