= Boxing (1981 video game) =

- Box art by Jerrol Richardson
- Developer: Mattel
- Publisher: Mattel
- Designer: Tom Loughry
- Programmer: Tom Loughry
- Platform: Intellivision
- Release: October 21, 1981
- Genre: Sports (boxing)
- Mode: Multiplayer

Boxing is a boxing video game written by Tom Loughry and published by Mattel Electronics for its Intellivision system in 1981. The game simulates a 15-round boxing match with the goal of knocking out the opponent. At the time of the game's release, a real-life professional boxing match may have lasted up to 15 rounds.

== Gameplay ==
Boxing allows players to select one of six boxers, each with a different set of strengths and weaknesses. To start the game, the player must select a fighting speed by pushing the numbers one, two or three on the keypad or the directional disc. The #3 is the slowest speed, #2 is medium speed, #1 is medium fast and the directional disc is the fastest. Once a desirable speed has been selected, the player then picks a boxer. The #1 blue boxer has strong defensive skills while the #2 red boxer has strong offensive power. The #3 tan boxer has strong endurance, and the #4 and #5 the dark green and light green boxers each have a balanced skill set. The #6 yellow boxer is considered "unpredictable", and will be given a random set of abilities by the computer. All boxers are right handed and the players may not choose the same boxer. After the selections are made, the two boxers are placed into a boxing ring and the match begins. Each round of the match lasts 90 seconds in simulated time, compared to three minutes in real life.

Player 1 always faces towards the right, while Player 2 always faces to the left. Using the controller's directional pad, players can move their boxers closer to or away from their opponent in order to throw punches. Punches are thrown using the keypad on the controller. Punches using the boxer's left arm are thrown using the keys on the left side of the pad, and punches using the right arm are mapped to the keys on the right side. There are four types of punches used: a feint punch, a head punch, a chest punch and a stomach punch. The keys in the middle allow the player to duck or to pull his punches.

A player wins the match if they are able to knock out the opposing boxer, either with a single punch or if the boxer is unable to get to his feet within ten seconds. The computer determines if a boxer is able to continue. If no knockout occurs, the round winner is determined by points. Players score points each time a punch is landed successfully, with the player who scored the most points winning that round. If neither player is knocked out by the end of the fifteenth round, the player that has the most cumulative points is named the winner. A "double knockdown" is possible, but it is extremely rare to have a "double knockout" which results in a draw.

== Legacy ==
Boxing has been re-released in the Intellivision Lives! compilation and on Microsoft's Game Room service in May 2010.
