= Rack 'Em Up =

1987 video game

- Developer: Konami
- Publisher: Konami
- Platform: Sports
- Release: JP: November 28, 1987; NA: November 1987
- Modes: Single-player, multiplayer

Rack 'Em Up, released as The Hustler (Note: Japanese: ザ・ハスラー, Hepburn: Za Hasurā) in Japan, is a 1987 pool video game developed and published by Konami for arcades. It features two distinct game types: 9-Ball and Rotation, played by a person resembling Tom Cruise.

Rack 'Em Up was made available in Microsoft's Game Room service in May 2010. Hamster Corporation released the game as part of their Arcade Archives series for the Nintendo Switch and PlayStation 4, as well as their Arcade Archives 2 series for the Nintendo Switch 2, PlayStation 5 and Xbox Series X/S in June 2026.

== Reception ==
Reception

Review score
Publication	Score
AllGame	3.5/5

In Japan, Game Machine listed The Hustler on their January 1, 1988 issue as being the ninth most-successful table arcade unit of the month.

== See also ==
- Video Hustler
