= Jail Break (video game) =

1986 video game

- Arcade flyer
- Developer: Konami
- Publisher: Konami
- Platforms: Arcade, Amstrad CPC, Commodore 64, ZX Spectrum
- Release: JP: March 1986; NA: April 1986
- Genre: Run and gun
- Modes: Single-player, multiplayer

Jail Break, released in Japan as Manhattan 24th Precinct (Note: Japanese: マンハッタン24分署, Hepburn: Manhattan 24 Bunsho) and also known as Jailbreak, is a run and gun video game developed and published by Konami for arcades. It was released in Japan in March 1986 and in North America in April 1986. It was ported to the Amstrad CPC, Commodore 64 and ZX Spectrum.

== Gameplay ==
The player controls a police officer tasked with rescuing civilians and subduing convicts in Manhattan, in order to restore order after a mass breakout at a prison. The player is armed with a pistol, tear gas, and a bazooka, which they must use to shoot convicts in order to subdue them and survive their attacks. Rescuing civilians will grant the player extra points and weapons, but shooting them will kill them and making it impossible to rescue them. Completing each level by reaching the end and shooting every convict will result in them being arrested, with the player crossing over the next area. The game ends after the player loses all lives or apprehends all convicts at the final level, the prison.

== Legacy ==
The games was re-released as part of Microsoft Studios' Game Room service, and by Hamster Corporation as part of their Arcade Archives series for the Nintendo Switch and PlayStation 4 in September 2023.
