= Battlantis =

1987 video game

- Arcade flyer
- Developer: Konami
- Publisher: Konami
- Platform: Arcade
- Release: JP: July 1987; NA: August 1987
- Genre: Fixed shooter
- Modes: Single-player, multiplayer

Battlantis (Note: Japanese: バトランティス, Hepburn: Batorantisu) is a 1987 fixed shooter video game developed and published by Konami for arcades. It was released in Japan in July 1987 and in North America in August 1987. In March 2010, it was included in the launch lineup of Microsoft's Game Room service. Hamster Corporation released the game as part of their Arcade Archives series for the Nintendo Switch and PlayStation 4, as well as their Arcade Archives 2 series for the Nintendo Switch 2, PlayStation 5 and Xbox Series X/S in October 2025.

== Gameplay ==
In Battlantis, players take control of Cripeuss III and attempt to defeat Asmodeus and the monsters invading his castle. Enemy formations are similar to those in Space Invaders and Galaga, with some monsters charging to the bottom of the screen. Occasionally, two monsters carrying an ark will cross the screen. Shooting this ark will drop a powerup, temporarily giving a more powerful shot. Once enemies reach the bottom, they fly sideways towards Cripeus III, making them nearly impossible to defeat unless the player has captured two power up, allowing sideways firing. There are 16 stages in total. After all 16 stages are cleared, there will be staff credits shown. After the credit rolls, the game will go into a second loop of 16 stages albeit slightly altered stage backgrounds, positions and boss designations. If a player manages to beat the second loop of 16 stages, then a staff credit from the first loop ending rolls and the game will end praising a player for accomplishing all.

== Reception ==
In Japan, Game Machine listed Battlantis on their July 15, 1987 issue as being the twenty-third most-successful table arcade unit of the month.
