= Hover Force =

1986 video game

- Developer: Mattel Electronics
- Publisher: INTV Corporation
- Designer: Steve Ettinger
- Platform: Intellivision
- Release: November 1986
- Genre: Flight simulation
- Mode: Single player

Hover Force is a flight simulation video game published by INTV Corporation for the Intellivision system in 1986. The game was initially developed by Mattel Electronics with the intent of it being played in 3D, but the company was shut down before it could be released. INTV, after acquiring the Intellivision assets from Mattel, re-tooled the game, which pits players against a terrorist group laying siege to a city, and then released it.

== Gameplay ==
In Hover Force, the player is a pilot of a combat helicopter. Terrorists are attacking the fictional city of New Seeburg. The player must eliminate the terrorists and also minimize the amount of damage they are causing. The helicopter is armed with laser cannons and water cannons, both with a limited amount of ammunition. The water cannons are used to put out fires started by the terrorists' activities.

Players seek out enemy helicopters with a radar screen, then fly using a top-down perspective toward their targets. The terrorists attack with a number of different helicopters, each with different skills and patterns. Attacks on the player's helicopter may cause damage to certain systems, such as weapons or the engine. Depending on the system, the damage can either make operating the craft difficult or cause the helicopter to crash, ending the game.

The player's missions start and end at an island base near the city. This base will also repair, refuel and re-arm the helicopter during the missions, but only twice; a third attempt to land prior to completion of the mission counts as a crash. Upon completion of the game, the player is given a rank between 1 and 100 based on their efficiency at both eliminating enemy helicopters and keeping damage to a minimum, with a score of 100 considered "perfect."

== Development ==
In the early 1980s, researchers at the University of Georgia developed a technology for viewing three-dimensional images using glasses fitted with special prisms, and attempted to solicit interest from various video game companies. Mattel Electronics began pursuing the technology, with Hover Force, then marketed as Hover Force 3-D, making its debut at the Consumer Electronics Show in Las Vegas in January 1984. Mattel Electronics had developed a method for producing the glasses at low cost, and had even decided to develop two additional 3-D titles, but the company was shut down before the plans could come to fruition. INTV Corporation, which acquired Intellivision's assets from Mattel, re-tooled the game and dropped any mention of 3-D for its release in 1986.

The technology was later used by Crayola for their 3D Chalk toy and the glasses can be used to experience the 3D effects in this Intellivision game.

== Legacy ==
Hover Force was re-released as part of the Intellivision Lives! collection. In July 2010, Microsoft re-released Hover Force on the Game Room service for its Xbox 360 console and for Games for Windows Live.
