= Super Basketball =

1984 video game

- North American arcade flyer
- Developer: Konami
- Publisher: Konami
- Platform: Arcade
- Release: JP: September 1984; NA: October 1984
- Genre: Sports
- Modes: Single-player, multiplayer

Super Basketball (Note: Japanese: スーパーバスケットボール, Hepburn: Sūpā Basukettobōru) is a 1984 basketball video game developed and published by Konami for arcades. It was released in Japan in September 1984 and in North America in October 1984. It was later included as part of Konami Classics Series: Arcade Hits for the Nintendo DS and Microsoft's Game Room service. Hamster Corporation released the game as part of their Arcade Archives series for the Nintendo Switch and PlayStation 4 in July 2025. It was followed by a sequel, Double Dribble, in 1986.

== Gameplay ==
The player controls players on an attacking basketball team at the final round of a game; it is not possible to play as the defending team, who always starts at a significantly higher score than the player's. The player must attempt to pass the ball to other teammates before throwing it within a strict time limit, scoring 2 points within the 3 point line and 3 points outside it. Fouls or failing to pass the ball result in further reduction of the time limit. Games are won when the player successfully scores more than the opposing team when the time is up.
