= Stubborn =

Stubborn may refer to:

- HMS Stubborn, a Second World War Royal Navy submarine
- Little Miss Stubborn, a character in the Little Miss series of books
- Mr. Stubborn, a character in the children's television show The Mr. Men Show
- Stubborn (album), 2024 album by Nigerian singer Victony
- "Stubborn", a song by Senser from Stacked Up (1994)

== See also ==
- List of people known as the Stubborn
- Citrus stubborn disease, a plant disease affecting species in the genus Citrus
