= Rally Speedway =

1983 video game

- Publishers: Adventure International; Commodore (C64)
- Designer: John Anderson
- Platforms: Atari 8-bit, Commodore 64
- Release: 1983: Atari 8-bit 1985: C64
- Genre: Racing
- Modes: Single-player, multiplayer

Rally Speedway (also known as John Anderson's Rally Speedway) is a top-down racing game developed by John Anderson for Atari 8-bit computers. It was published by Adventure International in 1983 as 16K ROM cartridge. A port to the Commodore 64 was published by Commodore in 1985. The game includes options for changing how vehicles handle, such as top speed, acceleration, and whether roads are wet, dry, or icy. There's also an integrated editor for creating and saving race tracks.

Anderson was inspired by the 1980 Intellivision game Auto Racing. In turn, Rally Speedway directly influenced the 1991 Nintendo Entertainment System game Micro Machines.

== Gameplay ==
Two players racing

Rally Speedway shows a birds-eye view of a small section of a larger race track that scrolls. Single-player and two-player modes are available, with no computer-controlled opponents present in either mode. In the single-player game, the player races against time. The only goal is to improve one's lap time while avoiding various roadside objects.

In the two-player mode, players race against each other over a set amount of laps (three by default). Both players share the same view of the track. Player vehicles get near the screen's edges when the distance between them grows. Once one player gets too far behind, he or she receives a 5-second time penalty, and both players are placed together at the current location. A player that crashes receives a 10-second penalty.

There are options for changing top speed and acceleration, road surface, and enabling immunity to crashes.

Rally Speedway includes an editor for creating new tracks and saving them on cassette or disk.

== Development ==
In a 2008 interview, John Anderson said that the idea for Rally Speedway came from the Intellivision game Auto Racing. He compressed the graphics to make them fit on a 16K cartridge:

I had a conversation over beers one night with Sparky Starks, another Adventure International author. He offered up a nice clear concise explanation of Huffman compression and I used that to fit the background graphics in the cartridge. Years later after becoming more knowledgeable about programming, I read a textbook explanation about Huffman encoding and found Sparky's verbal explanation over beers far more informative than the textbook.

== Reception ==
Lee Pappas of ANALOG Computing wrote in January 1984 that Rally Speedway "is one of the nicest designed and executed games for the [Atari 8-bit]". In the May 1984 issue of Electronic Games, Bill Kunkel praised the graphics and the variety of menu options for customizing the game, calling it "a virtual role model for games of this type". A 1984 review in Hi-Res magazine called Rally Speedway "graphically gorgeous" but criticized the top-down perspective for being less exciting than a behind-the-car view.

== Legacy ==
Andrew Graham, designer of Micro Machines for the Nintendo Entertainment System, used Rally Speedway as a model for that game:

Graham's key influence was an old Atari title named Rally Speedway, a scrolling, top-down perspective racing game, which offered an exciting head-to-head mode where the camera always followed the race leader – if the opponent fell too far behind, they'd get a time penalty and the race would re-start.

Micro Machines ended up using a scoring system instead of time penalties.

== See also ==
- Racing Destruction Set
