= Buzz Bombers =

1983 video game

- Developer: Mattel Electronics
- Publisher: Mattel Electronics
- Designer: Mike Breen
- Platform: Intellivision
- Release: July 1983
- Genre: Fixed shooter
- Mode: Single-player

Buzz Bombers is a fixed shooter video game developed by Mattel Electronics for its Intellivision system and released in 1983. Mattel's reaction to Atari's popular Centipede, the player controls a can of bug spray trying to ward off swarms of bees.

== Gameplay ==
In Buzz Bombers, the player character takes the form of a can of bug spray, protecting a garden of flowers from bees. The player's spray can fires shots of bee repellent that will turn the bee into a piece of honeycomb. The standard worker bees will fly left and right above the garden, reversing direction whenever they reach the edge of the screen or a piece of honeycomb. At the edge of the screen, the bee will drop one level closer to the garden. In later levels, killer bees will appear, which move much faster than the regular bees and are unaffected by honeycombs; killer bees turn into pieces of red honeycomb when shot. If a regular bee is trapped between two obstacles, it will form a beehive, which is worth bonus points at the completion of the level.

Should a bee of either type reach the bottom of the screen, it produces a flower. Flowers will begin to reduce the amount of space available to the spray can, potentially to the point where it is unable to move, destroying the spray can and costing the player one life.

The garden is also inhabited by a friendly hummingbird. The hummingbird will appear intermittently and will eat the honeycombs on the screen in a random order, giving additional points to the player; red honeycombs are worth more points than standard honeycombs. While invulnerable to the spray can's shots, the hummingbird will flee temporarily if it is hit too many times. The spray can's shots will also destroy honeycombs and beehives, forcing the player to aim carefully to avoid losing bonus points.

Points are scored for each bee (worker or killer) shot, as well as each honeycomb upon which the hummingbird feeds. When a level is completed by destroying a certain number of bees, bonus points are awarded for any beehives on screen.

== Development ==
During the game's development, a prototype was prepared where the spray can was branded as a can of Raid, a brand of insecticide produced by SC Johnson, in an attempt to get the company to partner on the game's promotion; SC Johnson declined the offer. As the game went into mass production, the information on the box indicated that Buzz Bombers allowed two players to play, an error which forced the incorrect information to be corrected by hand on every game box prior to shipment.

== Legacy ==
Buzz Bombers was re-released as part of the Intellivision Lives! collection for computers and other game consoles. In May 2010, Buzz Bombers was made available on Microsoft's now-defunct Game Room service for its Xbox 360 console and for Games for Windows Live.
