= Hot Chase =

1988 video game

- Japanese flyer also promoting Hard Puncher.
- Developer: Konami
- Publisher: Konami
- Platform: Arcade
- Release: June 1988
- Genre: Racing
- Mode: Single-player

Hot Chase is an arcade racing video game released by Konami in 1988. Players drive a white Porsche 959 out of an enemy country to the Border crossing of a friendly one. The car has a bomb attached to it that explodes in a set time. If the bomb explodes, players must restart. There are many obstacles along the way, including railroad crossings, military checkpoints, helicopters that shoot at the car and other cars. The gameplay is similar to Chase H.Q..

== Ending ==
Completing the game resulted in a scene where the hero exits the car, takes his machine gun, and fires at the car to add to the damage before the bomb explodes. Then the game played the following message: "Mission Complete. You have succeeded in stealing the enemy armored super car and have crossed the border to freedom. After a few days the enemy surrendered to our country. You will be remembered for your brave deeds. Thanks a million!"

== Reception ==
In Japan, Game Machine listed Hot Chase on their January 15, 1989 issue as being the eighth most-successful upright/cockpit arcade unit of the month.
