= Hyper Crash =

1987 video game

- Developer: Konami
- Publisher: Konami
- Platform: Arcade
- Release: JP/NA: September 1987
- Genre: Racing
- Mode: Single-player

Hyper Crash (Note: Japanese: ハイパークラッシュ, Hepburn: Haipā Kurasshu) is a 1987 racing video game developed and published by Konami for arcades. It was released in Japan and North America in September 1987.

The game was included as part of Microsoft's Game Room service. Hamster Corporation released the game as part of their Arcade Archives series for the Nintendo Switch and PlayStation 4, as well as their Arcade Archives 2 series for the Nintendo Switch 2, PlayStation 5 and Xbox Series X/S in March 2026.

== Gameplay ==
The player controls a car who attempts to finish a journey across six checkpoints alongside other cars in a similar manner to Sega's Out Run. Unlike Out Run, the player does not race against a set timer extended by checkpoints, but runs on expendable fuel. The player can refuel and gain extra points by smashing into rival cars or jumping into them, destroying them and allowing the player to lead.
