= Yie Ar Kung-Fu =

1984 video game

- Arcade flyer
- Developer: Konami
- Publishers: Konami; Imagine (computers)
- Composer: Miki Higashino
- Platforms: Arcade, MSX, Famicom/NES, ZX Spectrum, Commodore 64, Amstrad CPC, BBC Micro, Acorn Electron
- Release: Arcade: JP: October 25, 1984; WW: March 1985; MSX: JP: January 1985; EU: April 1985; Famicom: JP: April 22, 1985; ZX Spectrum: EU: August 1985; Commodore 64: EU: 1986; NA: December 1986
- Genre: Fighting
- Modes: Single-player, multiplayer

Yie Ar Kung-Fu (Japanese: イー・アル・カンフー, Hepburn: Ī Aru Kanfū) is a fighting game developed and published by Konami for arcades. It first had a limited Japanese release in October 1984, before having a wide release nationwide in January 1985 and then internationally in March. Along with Data East's Karate Champ (1984), which influenced Yie Ar Kung-Fu, it is one of the games that established the basis for modern fighting games.

The game was inspired by Bruce Lee's Hong Kong martial arts films, with the main player character Oolong modelled after Lee (like Bruceploitation films). In contrast to the grounded realism of Karate Champ, Yie Ar Kung-Fu moved the genre towards more fantastical, fast-paced action, with various different characters having a variety of special moves and high jumps, establishing the template for subsequent fighting games. It also introduced the health meter system to the genre, in contrast to the point-scoring system of Karate Champ.

The game was a commercial success in arcades, becoming the highest-grossing arcade conversion kit of 1985 in the United States while also being successful in Japan and Europe. It was ported to various home systems, including home computer conversions which were critically and commercially successful, becoming the best-selling home video game of 1986 in the United Kingdom.

== Gameplay ==
A screenshot of the arcade version

Oolong (or Lee in the MSX and Famicom versions) must fight all the martial arts masters given by the game (eleven in the arcade version; five to thirteen in the home ports).

The player faces a variety of opponents, each with a unique appearance and fighting style. The player can perform up to 16 different moves, using a combination of buttons and joystick movements while standing, crouching or jumping. Moves are thrown at high, middle, and low levels. Regardless of the move that defeated them, male characters (save Feedle) always fall unconscious lying on their backs with their legs apart (Oolong flails his legs), and female characters always fall lying on their sides. Feedle disappears. When a player gains an extra life, the word "xiè xiè" (Mandarin for "thank you") is heard.

Instead of a point-scoring system like Karate Champ (1984), Yie Ar Kung-Fu instead introduces a health meter system. Each fighter has a health meter, which depletes as they take hits. Once a fighter's health meter is fully depleted, it leads to a knockout.

On the arcade version, players can play on until all their lives are gone. No bonus lives are given thereafter once 9,999,900 is scored.

== Characters ==
MSX version of Yie Ar Kung Fu

- Oolong (Chinese: 烏龍; pinyin: Wūlóng, Japanese: ウーロン Ūron; see oolong).
  - Controlled by the player, this Bruce Lee-based kung fu shih fu's story focuses on him entering the "Throne Cup" tournament in order to fulfill his father's last wish, Oolong participated in the two fighting arenas with the goal of winning the Throne Cup and win the title of "Grand Master" in honor of the loving memory of his deceased father. On Oolong's side is a variety of punch and kick blows reachable by combining the joystick with one of the buttons (punch or kick). He also has the greatest jumping ability of all the game's fighters, with the exception of Blues.

"Hot Fighting History":

- Buchu
  - He uses a leaping motion to fly over Oolong, and as a middle level attack against him. Buchu may be big and powerful, but he is also slow. Much like Oolong, Buchu does not use weapons to fight. He is the first opponent in the first gauntlet and when he gets hit in the crotch, his eyes bug out and the game says "nǐ hǎo" (which is Mandarin for "hi" or "hello").
- Star
  - The first female opponent Oolong faces. Star is a young girl in a pink outfit who throws shuriken (that can be punched or kicked for extra points) at all levels, and uses fast punches and kicks. Star bears resemblance to Taiwanese martial arts actress Angela Mao.
- Nuncha
  - He is a man in a yellow gi-swinging nunchaku at Oolong at high and middle levels. His appearance is a homage to John Saxon's role as Mr. Roper in the film Enter the Dragon, and his nunchaku skills were modeled after Bruce Lee's.
- Pole
  - A short man who carries a large bo and uses it against Oolong. Pole also uses it to pole vault to gain extra momentum for his moves.
- Feedle
  - He is basically an endurance test for Oolong. Numerous enemies (or the same enemy who can replicate himself) attack from both sides of Oolong, punching high and low. In some ports, like the Commodore 64 one, he/they are absent.

"Masterhand History":

- Chain
  - He awaits Oolong at the start of the second gauntlet (at the end of the first one in the Commodore 64 version). He is a large man who swings a giant chain with a claw-like attachment at the end (that can be punched or kicked at the extended end for extra points).
- Club
  - Another large man who attacks Oolong. Club swings a giant spiked club (chúi) and bears a shield on his right arm to block Oolong's attacks at middle level.
- Fan
  - Another female warrior who wears a cheongsam and is more feminine than Star. Fan throws steel fans at Oolong like shuriken (that can be punched or kicked for extra points but only for a limited time before three at a time are thrown) and kicks very swiftly. The fans fall in a feather-like pattern.
- Sword
  - A dangerous warrior who comes ready to pounce on Oolong with a Dao and impressive aerial moves. He is also capable of warping around to the other side of the screen.
- Tonfun
  - The final opponent Oolong must face before meeting his ultimate challenger, Blues. Tonfun attacks with two tonfa and fast-paced martial arts kicks.
- Blues
  - Almost being a mirror image of Oolong without a shirt on and can match him move-for-move. Oolong has to find some weakness on Blues to win (Blues can often defeat Oolong with a series of speed kicks to the body if trapped). Since none of his clothes are blue, Blues is modeled after Bruce Lee with his name being another reference to the martial arts actor, based on his first name's pronunciation when said by a Japanese speaker. Blues is likely also modeled after Chuck Norris' character Colt from the film The Way of the Dragon, both fighting shirtless, sporting white pants, and the final opponent fought by the game and film's (Tang Lung) respective protagonists, alongside his character select portrait in the GBA port depicting him with a stoic, disciplined demeanor compared to the confident and energetic Oolong. When Blues is defeated, Oolong is the winner and the game begins again with Buchu (in the BBC Micro version, Blues is replaced by a second round with Feedle). Characters start to move more frequently and have more difficult attacks (e.g., Buchu flies more frequently, Star often throws three stars at a time, Nuncha starts jumping in response to Oolong's low kicks, Pole makes multiple hit attempts with the pole and not just one per charge motion at Oolong).

The MSX and Famicom ports have many differences compared to their arcade counterpart. The MSX/Famicom version also follows a different plot, featuring protagonist Lee infiltrating the "Menma Tower" to defeat the villainous Chop Suey Gang.

Opposed to Oolong's 11, Lee faces only 5 opponents:

- Wang: Armed with a pole. Unlike Pole, he does not use his pole to gain momentum.
- Tao: His special attack is breathing fireballs at the hero.
- Chen: This port's version of Chain. After Chen's defeat, there is a bonus round where the hero must hit objects thrown the 3 Shots at him to score points.
- Lang: This port's version of Star, but with quicker shots and moves.
- Wu/Mu: The mysterious leader of the Chop Suey Gang, called Wu in the MSX version, and Mu in the Famicom version. He is similar to Buchu, as he also uses a leaping motion. When he is defeated, Lee kicks the gong and the game loops with a higher difficulty and different background colors.

There are two hidden characters in Konami Collector's Series: Arcade Advanced for the Game Boy Advance. To have access to them, the player must input the famous Konami Code at the title screen. The characters are available in the special two-player mode found on this collection. The fighters are Bishoo (a woman dressed in white who attacks with daggers) and Clayman (a living statue who attacks with a sword bigger than Sword's). A hidden character in the mobile phone version is Katana, a samurai who attacks with a katana.

== Ports and related releases ==
Yie Ar Kung-Fu was subsequently widely ported to platforms including the MSX, Family Computer, Commodore 64, ZX Spectrum, Amstrad CPC and BBC Micro.

In 2002 it was included in the Konami Collector's Series: Arcade Advanced for Game Boy Advance.

The arcade version was released by Hamster Corporation for the PlayStation 2 in Japan as part of their Oretachi Gēsen Zoku series in 2005, as well as their Arcade Archives series for the Nintendo Switch and PlayStation 4 in 2019.

The game was released on Xbox Live Arcade for the Xbox 360 on July 18, 2007, with updated graphics and for the Nintendo DS in Konami Classics Series: Arcade Hits.

In recent years, this game was re-released on some TV game products. In 1987, the game was included on the compilation Konami Coin-op Hits with Hyper Sports, Green Beret and Mikie.

The Famicom version was relaunched for the Game Boy Color (as a part of Konami GB Collection Vol.4), Sega Saturn and PlayStation.

The arcade version of Yie Ar Kung-Fu was made available on Microsoft's Game Room service for the Xbox 360 and Windows in July 2010.

The MSX version of Yie Ar Kung-Fu was released for D4 Enterprise's Project EGG service in October 2014 in Japan.

== Reception ==
Reception (home computers)

Review scores
Publication	Score			
Publication	Arcade	C64	PC	ZX
ACE		5/5	5/5 (CPC)	5/5
Crash				92%
Computer and Video Games		34/40	37/40 (MSX); 34/40 (BBC/CPC)	34/40
Sinclair User				4/5
Your Sinclair				8/10
Commodore User		5/5		
Play Meter	10/10			
Retro Gamer			91% (8-bit)	

Awards
Publication	Award
Crash	Crash Smash
Amstrad Action	Mastergame

In Japan, Game Machine listed Yie Ar Kung-Fu on their March 1, 1985 issue as being the second most-successful table arcade unit of the month. In North America, it was number seven on the RePlay arcade chart for software conversion kits in December 1985. It ended the year as America's highest-grossing arcade conversion kit of 1985, and one of the year's top five highest-grossing games in route/street locations. The arcade game was also a commercial success in Europe.

The home computer conversions were also commercially successful. In Europe, it entered the UK software sales charts at number two, below Capcom's Commando. Yie Ar Kung-Fu then topped the charts in January 1986 and again in February, and was then number two in March. It went on to become the overall best-selling game of 1986 in the United Kingdom. Its budget re-release later topped the UK budget sales chart in August 1989.

== Sequels ==
A sequel, Yie Ar Kung-Fu II, was released a year later. The sequel was released only for home computers and was never ported to the arcades. Another fighting game by Konami, Martial Champion, was originally planned to be released as Yie Ar Kung-Fu 2. In fact, Jin, the protagonist of Martial Champion, was modeled after Lee, the protagonist of the Famicom and MSX versions, and after Ryu from the 1987 Street Fighter arcade game.

Shao-lin's Road (1985) was also marketed as a follow-up to Yie Ar Kung-Fu.
