= The Final Round =

1988 video game

- Arcade flyer with art by Hideaki Kodama
- Developer: Konami
- Publisher: Konami
- Director: Hideyuki Tsujimoto
- Designer: Keisuke Hashima
- Programmers: Gen Suzuki; Tadasu Kitae
- Artists: Kengo Nakamura; K. Ishimoto; K. Hattori; Akihito Nonami
- Composers: Motoaki Furukawa; Shinji Tasaka
- Platform: Arcade
- Release: JP: December 1988; NA: January 1989
- Genre: Sports
- Modes: Single-player, multiplayer

The Final Round, released in Japan as Hard Puncher (Note: Japanese: ハードパンチャー - 血まみれの栄光 -, Hepburn: Hādopanchā: Chimamire no Eikō), is a 1988 boxing video game developed and published by Konami for arcades. It was released in Japan in December 1988 and in North America in January 1989. Hamster Corporation released the game as part of their Arcade Archives series for the Nintendo Switch and PlayStation 4 in August 2024.

== Gameplay ==
When a one-player game is started, one of two different boxers can be selected by pressing the one or two player button. The player then allocates 100 points between three different skills (Speed, Power, and Stamina). A high "Speed" level makes a boxer move and punch faster. A high "Power" level makes a boxer cause more damage when punching, and a high "Stamina" level makes a boxer endure more damage and recover more energy after being knocked down.

Joe Vulcan stuns Red Falco with a powerful Uppercut.

When a two-player game is started, both boxers allocate their points and fight against each other. The winner stays, while the loser may get a rematch by inserting another coin. During a normal game, a second player can buy-in and challenge at any time (except during "training sessions").

The player uses the joystick to move around the ring, as well as three buttons: face punch, body punch, and block punch. During a bout, the block punch button protects the player's fighter from enemy attacks and switches the character's guard between face and body each time it is pressed. The two punch buttons may be used alternately to pull out combinations or a "Super Punch".

If the player is knocked down, they must shake the joystick and press the buttons repeatedly to refill a bar and get back to their feet. If all three rounds are fought, the judges pick the winner by decision. Each opponent has his own, unique fighting style with strengths and weaknesses. Fights can be won by either knockout, technical knockout or the judges' decision. These are highlighted with a special animation of the defeated boxer crumbling to the canvas.

Every two bouts, players are given the choice of entering a "training session" to earn more skill points or skip these sessions entirely. The "Speed" session consists of punching green dummies appearing from eight different positions. The "Power" session consists of punching small volleyballs tossed from both left and right, high and low. The "Stamina" session consists of jumping a spinning rod of increasing speed.

When the player defeats the World Champion, a special winning animation will play with a congratulatory message. The credits roll, and the game ends. The total fight time and final score are displayed on screen. Depending on the player's total time at the end of the game, the winning animation and message change, effectively serving as multiple endings.

== Characters ==
- Jabbin' Jim (Player 1)
  Modeled after Sylvester Stallone's role as Rocky Balboa from the Rocky franchise as well as Lance Bean from the Contra franchise. Known as Rocky Smith in the Japanese version.
- Gentleman Joe (Player 2)
  Modeled after Bill Rizer who is also from the Contra franchise. Known as Joe Vulcan in the Japanese version.
- Knockout Nick (KBA Rank: #7)
  A lookalike of Mr. T's role as Clubber Lang from the film Rocky III (1982), but slow and weak. Known as Mr. Mohican in the Japanese version.
- Red Falco (KBA Rank: #6)
  Seasoned boxer from England, his name is a play on "Red Falcon" from the Contra game series.
- Mad Mongol (KBA Rank: #5)
  Mongolian slugger skilled in fast flurries.
- Iron Drago (KBA Rank: #4)
  A tough Soviet fighter, based on Dolph Lundgren's role as Ivan Drago from the film Rocky IV.
- Steel Fist Fritz (KBA Rank: #3)
  Powerful boxer from Italy. Named Mark Rentz in the Japanese version.
- Bronx Bruiser (KBA Rank: #2)
  Fast and unpredictable Brazilian fighter. Named Avege Hidev in the Japanese version.
- Harlem Hit Man (KBA Rank: #1)
  Murderous hitter of unknown origins. Named Marvin Cobra in the Japanese version.
- Black Stallion (KBA Champion)
  Based on Mike Tyson, he is durable, strong and very fast.

== Regional differences ==
The Japanese version of the game (known internally as Version H) is notably different from its overseas counterparts (Versions L and M) in several ways: the player's energy does not constantly drain by merely walking around the ring. The two main characters and some of the enemy boxers have been given alternate names. Most of the voice samples have been changed from English to Japanese, and the presence of a few Easter Eggs not included in the American release.

These include a flock of birds appearing in the ring at the start of a fight (damage based), an alternate head (Moai) for the referee (time based), a bonus hidden in the "Power" training session, and two different circuits (game modes) made accessible via joystick input at the start of a new game.

== Soundtrack ==
The game's Soundtrack was produced by Konami Kukeiha Club and published by King Records on July 21, 1989, as part of "Konami Game Music Collection Vol.0" along additional soundtracks from Flak Attack (MX 5000), The Main Event, Gang Busters, City Bomber, and Devastators.

Track #	Track name	Time
53	Hard Blow (Opening Demo)	00:25
54	Let's Do It! (Title Demo)	00:09
55	Cross Counter (Coin Toss BGM)	00:09
56	Powermeter (Power Selection BGM)	00:42
57	Introduction (Player introduction BGM)	00:10
58	Hard Puncher (Stages 1, 5 BGM)	01:22
59	You Can't Get Him (Continue)	00:43
60	Kill Him (Stages 2, 4, 6 BGM)	01:20
61	Power Up (Training BGM)	00:49
62	Don't Quail (Stages 3, 7 BGM)	01:12
63	Judgement (Decision BGM)	00:08
64	Lost Game (Game Over)	00:07
65	Ranking (Ranking BGM)	00:43
66	The Final Round (Stage 8 BGM)	01:10
67	You Got Him (Winner BGM)	00:11
68	You Are Perfect! (Ending BGM)	01:55

== Reception ==
In Japan, Game Machine listed The Final Round on their February 1, 1989 issue as being the fifth most-successful table arcade unit of the month. A review in The Games Machine described The Final Round as "nothing out of the ordinary" and "despite its title, by no means the definitive boxing game" but still praised the game's graphics.
