= Video Hustler =

1981 video game

- Japanese flyer
- Developer: Konami
- Publishers: JP: Leijac; NA: Dynamo
- Platform: Arcade
- Release: JP: July 1981; NA: December 1981
- Genre: Sports
- Modes: Single-player, multiplayer

Video Hustler (Note: Japanese: ビデオハスラ一, Hepburn: Bideo Hasurā) is a 1981 pool video game developed by Konami and published by Leijac for arcades. It was released in Japan in July 1981 and in North America by Dynamo as Lil' Hustler in December 1981. Hamster Corporation released the game as part of their Arcade Archives series for the Nintendo Switch and PlayStation 4 and their Arcade Archives 2 series for the Nintendo Switch 2, PlayStation 5 and Xbox Series X/S in September 2025.

== Gameplay ==
The gameplay is basically billiards, but with numbered, color-coded pucks on top of a lacquered plywood-made, green board, similar to carrom.

== Reception ==
In Japan, Game Machine listed Video Hustler on their June 1, 1983 issue as being the twenty-fourth most-successful table arcade unit of the month.

== See also ==
- Rack 'Em Up
