= MX5000 =

1987 video game

- Japanese arcade flyer
- Developer: Konami
- Publisher: Konami
- Platform: Arcade
- Release: JP: August 1987; WW: 1987
- Genre: Scrolling shooter
- Modes: Single-player, multiplayer

MX5000, released in Japan as Flak Attack (Note: Japanese: フラック・アタック, Hepburn: Furakku Atakku), is a 1987 vertically scrolling shooter video game developed and published by Konami for arcades.

== Gameplay ==
The player controls a fighter plane from the country Lafanis, against the Tesaris Empire which seeks world domination. The player starts off with basic ammunition, which can be powered up by defeating enemies and filling a "Plane" bar. A limited supply of bombs can be used to defeat ground-based enemies, with "Tank" bar can also be filled to empower it.

== Reception ==
In Japan, Game Machine listed MX5000 on their September 15, 1987 issue as being the seventh most-successful table arcade unit of the month.

== Legacy ==
MX5000 was made available on Microsoft's Game Room service for its Xbox 360 console and for Windows on September 15, 2010. Hamster Corporation released the game as part of their Arcade Archives series for the PlayStation 4 in 2016 and Nintendo Switch in 2020.
