= Dokorder =

Tape recorder brand

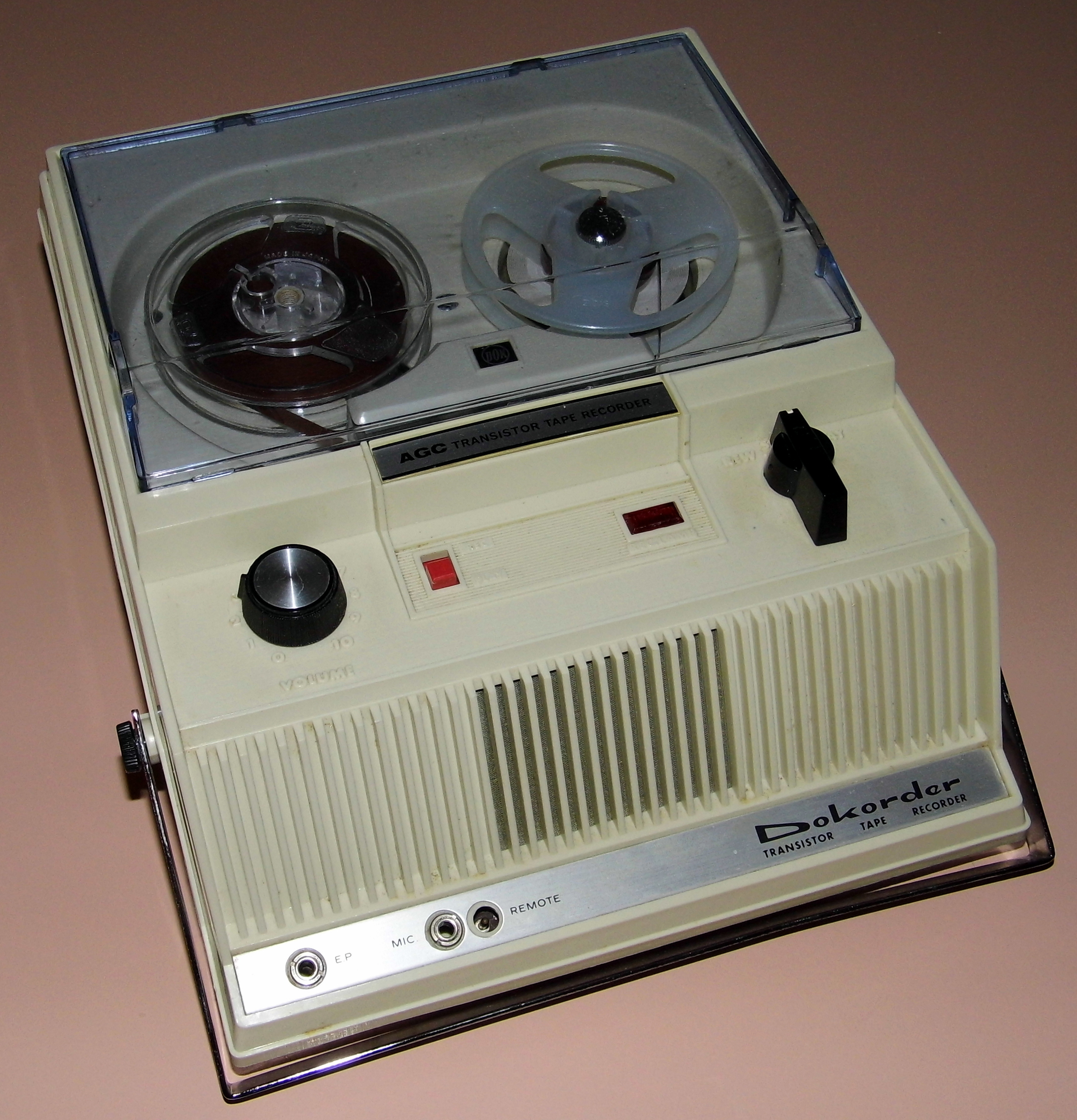
Dokorder

Dokorder was a brand of tape recorder from Japanese electronics company Denki Onkyo, located in Ōta, Tokyo (not related to the Onkyo audio company of Osaka, nor to Denon) that included a four-reel transport system called "Dub-A-Tape" capable of feeding two different tapes through the same tape head assembly and, in the process, recording a duplicate of a tape. (The master and blank tapes passed through the same capstan, but through different tape head areas, yielding a Y-shaped tape path reflected in the slots built into the head assembly. Denki Onkyo also supplied a consumer and semi-pro line of reel to reel recorders (including 4-track multitracks) that competed with Tascam/Teac and Sony but ultimately its products were found to be less durable than those of the competition.

Dokorder sold many different reel to reel tape recorders including 2- and 4-track recorders, some took 10.5" reels. The model 1120 was a popular 2-channel recorder in the 1970s.

In 1982, Murata Manufacturing acquired 55% shares of Denki Onkyo, and in 1999, the company has been fully merged into Murata. In the mid 1960s Dokorder manufactured the 800 series Concertone tape recorders and decks.
