= Auto Racing (video game) =

1980 video game

- Box art by Jerrol Richardson
- Developer: APh Technological Consulting
- Publishers: Mattel Electronics; Sears
- Designer: Larry Zwick
- Programmer: Larry Zwick
- Platform: Intellivision
- Release: October 3, 1980
- Genre: Racing
- Modes: Single-player, multiplayer

Auto Racing is a racing video game written by Larry Zwick and released by Mattel for its Intellivision video game console in 1980. Auto Racing pits two players against each other (or a single player against the clock) using a top-down perspective on one of five different race courses. Auto Racing was released under the same name by Sears for its private-label version of the Intellivision console, the Super Video Arcade.

== Gameplay ==
In Auto Racing, players begin by selecting one of the five numbered courses, with the higher numbers representing increased difficulty. Players can also allow the computer to randomly choose from the first four courses. Next, players select from one of five Formula One racing vehicles, each with a different set of capabilities. Players cannot pick the same cars, but two of the cars are identical in specifications, allowing for two-player matches for drivers of equal skills. The cars will accelerate to their top speeds automatically, with the player in control of steering and braking.

The courses are shown from a top-down perspective, and there are no computer-controlled cars on the track. Each course has a number of invisible checkpoints. During the race, if a player crashes into an obstacle along the course, or if one player's lead over their opponent pushes the opponent off the screen, the cars will be reset at the last checkpoint passed. In a single-player game, the player must complete five laps of the course as quickly as possible. In a two-player game, players score two points whenever their opponent crashes, or one point when they take a significant lead over their opponent; the game ends when one player scores 50 points.

== Development ==
In its initial release, Auto Racing used a directional steering mechanic, where players pressed the disc to steer the car towards a screen direction. For example, to steer the car south on the playfield, the bottom of the disc is pressed. The amount of steering depends on where the 16 position disc is pressed. After receiving a number of complaints, Mattel revised the game with a realistic steering mechanic, where to make left turns the left side of the disc is pressed, and for right turns the right side of the disc is pressed. The point on the disc for hard turns stays consistent regardless of the car's orientation. No reference was made on the game's packaging to indicate which steering mechanic that particular cartridge used, with the instructions inside the package indicating the version to be used. The programmer included the preferred realistic steering in the original release as a hidden option. The hidden feature is enabled by holding 1+6+9 on the controller keypad during system start/reset. The option is per controller. The revised cartridge does not have any hidden option.

== Reception ==
In Video magazine's "Arcade Alley" column, Auto Race was described as employing a "boldly innovative approach" and as "undeniably the best video game any manufacturer has produced about this subject so far". Reviewers emphasized the game's graphics which were compared favorably to those of Armor Battle, and praise was given to the realistic gameplay feel afforded by the game's use of a zoomed-in scrolling section of racetrack rather than a birds-eye view of the entire track. While describing this "unusual presentation of the playfield" as one of the game's best features, reviewers also noted that an unfortunate side effect is that if two players in a player-versus-player game become too distantly separated the game must compensate by cutting the race short and awarding a victory to the leading car.

Auto Race was awarded "Best Sports Game" at the third annual Arkie Awards where it was described as an example of "true blood-and-thunder racing", and as "the racing game even those who hate motor sports ought to love".

== Legacy ==
Auto Racing is included in the Intellivision Lives! compilation.

== See also ==
- Super Bug, 1977 arcade game that uses a similar overhead perspective
- Rally Speedway, 1983 game of the same style as Auto Racing
