= Horse Racing (video game) =

1980 video game

- Developer: Mattel Electronics
- Publishers: Mattel Electronics; Sears
- Designer: Chris Hawley
- Platform: Intellivision
- Release: October 3, 1980
- Genre: Sports (horse racing)
- Mode: Multiplayer

Horse Racing is a horse racing video game released by Mattel Electronics for its Intellivision console in 1980. Although primarily a sports video game, it received Mattel's "Gaming Network" branding due to its parimutuel betting on horses.

The game features eight Thoroughbred race horses residing in the fictional Rainbow Thoroughbred Stables at a western Kentucky race track called Plympton Downs (named after longtime sportscaster and Intellivision sales personality George Plimpton). Each of the horses have differing abilities (front runner, pace keeper, come from behind, etc.), and vary from race to race (a horse with come from behind traits in one match may have front runner abilities in the next match). These horses are known by their colors (instead of their post position numbers—unlike in regular horse racing).

Horse Racing was also released by Sears for their Intellivision private-label clone, the Super Video Arcade.

== Gameplay ==
In Intellivision's original Horse Racing game, six players (bettors) begin each of the 10 races on the simulated match program by looking at the race program screen. Four horses are entered for each race, with bettors possessing a $750 simulated bankroll. For each of the four horses entered into a race, the odds, along with past performances, are listed (accessed by a side action button when placing bets). Each bettor then keys in their player number (from 1 to 6 on the keypad), enters a bet pay amount against their bankroll, and places the bet (of a win or exacta only by pressing [9] on the keypad) on their selection of horse(s). After all bets are made, a keypad press of [0] then [ENTER] starts the race.

The call to the post then plays. After a brief silence, the starting gate opens, and four Thoroughbred horses begin racing. During the race, the disk/joystick is used to move the horse, while the side action buttons perform either of two functions (top to coax the horse along, bottom to whip it). Each race takes place on any of three different types of track: dry, turf (grass), or muddy. Additionally, the races run in length from 3 to 10 furlongs. After the horses cross the finish line, the results are displayed on the tote board as colorful horse heads (reading from right to left in finishing order), along with the elapsed time of the race. The play screen then switches to the bet placing screen for the next race. After the full 10-race match program has run, a GAME OVER screen appears, with the bettors' final bankroll amounts.

The track is horizontally scrolling, with its color changing according to the racing surface (khaki for dry, pine green for turf, and brown for muddy). A 4-stall starting gate with the horses loaded therein is shown at the beginning of each race. The cheering crowd fanfare sound is played as the horses cross the finish line.

== Legacy ==
Horse Racing is included in the Intellivision Lives! game collection.
