= Motocross (video game) =

1983 video game

- Developer: Mattel Electronics
- Publisher: Mattel Electronics
- Designer: Rick Koenig
- Platform: Intellivision
- Release: October 1983
- Genre: Racing
- Mode: Multiplayer

Motocross is a racing video game produced by Mattel and released for its Intellivision system in 1983. The players each control a motocross bike in a race to the finish line.

== Gameplay ==
Players can set the gameplay to normal direction or reverse direction. Gravity affects the gameplay resulting in bikes that accelerate, skid and jump realistically.

== Legacy ==
The game appeared on Microsoft's now-defunct Game Room service.
