= Hoccer =

1983 video game

- Developer: Eastern Micro Electronics
- Publisher: Eastern Micro Electronics
- Platform: Arcade
- Release: NA: October 1983
- Genre: Sports
- Mode: Multiplayer

Hoccer is an arcade sports video game released by Eastern Micro Electronics in 1983. The game shows futuristic interpretation of ice hockey cross-overed with some elements of the game of soccer.

== Gameplay ==
The player controls Andrew, the one man team. Ord and Clee are robots whose goal is to destroy him any way they can (by driving him against the boards, into a spinner, or by hitting him with a supercharged ball). Knock out Ord and Clee with your ball or by hitting them against the sides. Points are also scored by hitting the goal and hitting the targets on the sides.

== Scoring ==
- Hitting robots into wall: 500 points per robot.
- Hitting robots with ball: 500 points for 1st robot, 1, 000 and 1, 500 for 2nd and 3rd robot hit with same shot.
- Hitting side targets: 100 points
- Hitting side targets after spinning a spinner: 200, 400, 600, 800 or 1, 000 points.
- Hitting all side targets give you extra player.
- Hitting Goal: 1, 000 points plus robots are frozen.

== Reception ==
Gene Lewin of Play Meter magazine reviewed the arcade game, scoring it 6 out of 10.
