= Hole Land =

1984 video game

- Japanese flyer
- Developer: Tecfri
- Platform: Arcade
- Release: 1984
- Genre: Fixed shooter
- Modes: Single-player, multiplayer

Hole Land is a fixed shooter released as an arcade video game in Japan in 1984. It was developed by the Spanish company Tecfri.

== Gameplay ==
The player controls a multi-colored robot that can move left and right and perform jumps. It can also shoot enemies such as small humanoids, rats, ghosts and snakes that emerge from holes at the top of the screen. The objective is to eliminate all of the enemies before they reach the bottom in order to complete each level. Enemies can attack with bombs, which prevents the player from being able to jump, move and shoot for a short time. The player can also be rendered defenseless if they get hit by incoming rocks from vulcans. A life is lost when enemies touch the player and take away the robot's lower half, which can be avoided by jumping over them.

The game has three stages. In the first two, each time the robot is damaged by rocks and bombs, a friendly old man appears to help fix it.

In the last part of the third stage, the player faces off against the boss: a giant monster with a ball-shaped body and an enormous mouth with pointed teeth. The goal is to shoot and destroy all of its teeth before it reaches the player, otherwise the monster will devour the robot. If the boss is defeated, the player is returned to the first stage.
