= Yie Ar Kung-Fu II =

1986 video game

- MSX cover art
- Developers: Konami (MSX); France Image Logiciel (Thomson); James Software (other formats)
- Publishers: Konami (MSX); France Image Logiciel (Thomson); Imagine Software (other formats)
- Platforms: Acorn Electron, Amstrad CPC, BBC Micro, Commodore 64, MSX, Thomson MO5, Thomson TO7/70, ZX Spectrum
- Release: Home computers 1986Windows Store: JP: November 25, 2014 (as EGG Project)
- Genre: Beat 'em up
- Mode: Single-player

Yie Ar Kung-Fu II: The Emperor Yie-Gah (イーガー皇帝の逆襲 ～イー・アル・カンフー・２～, Īgā-kōtei no Gyakushū: Ī Aru Kanfū 2; "Emperor Yie-Gah's Counterattack: Yie Ar Kung-Fu 2") is a video game developed and released by Konami in 1986 as a sequel to 1985's Yie Ar Kung-Fu. Rather than a pure fighting game as the original, it is a beat 'em up. It was released for the Commodore 64, MSX, Amstrad CPC, ZX Spectrum, BBC Micro and Acorn Electron home computer systems and featured a different approach to the game. In France, the video game was also released for the Thomson computers.

== Plot ==
Lee Young is a young martial artist whose father previously defeated the Chop Suey Gang. One member survived and later declared himself Emperor Yie-Gah. Lee Young sets out to defeat Yie-Gah and his allies.

== Gameplay ==
Lee Young goes through three sections of a level to face its boss. Along the way, he meets up with ninjas. The power-ups Lee can acquire are oolong tea to replenish health and lo mein for temporary invincibility. Lee can only carry three oolong teas at a time.

The game also features a two-player mode, in which Player 1 controls Lee while Player 2 has the choice to play as either Yen Pei, Lan Fang or Po Chin, making Lan Fang the first ever playable female character in a fighting game (predating Saboteur II female ninja by one year and Chun Li in Street Fighter II by five years).

== Main characters ==
- Lee Young: The main protagonist of the game. His moves mimic those of Oolong from the arcade game. His father was the star in the NES and MSX versions of Yie Ar Kung-Fu, Lee.
- Yen Pei wears a purple robe and is also known as Emperor Yie-Gah. His red braid is so large, he uses it in similar fashion as Chain's chain whip.
- Lan Fang wears a blue dress and has short hair. Like her predecessor, Fan, she throws steel fans at Lee.
- Po Chin is large and wears a brown outfit with a smiley face on it. He attacks with gas clouds.
- Wen Hu wears a yellow outfit and a metal mask to cover his face. When he battles, Wen Hu throws his mask at his opponent as it zooms around like a mosquito.
- Wei Chin is bald and wears green pants. He attacks with a boomerang.
- Mei Ling has long hair and wears a red dress. Similar to the Yie Ar Kung-Fu hidden character Bishoo, Mei Ling throws daggers at Lee.
- Han Chen wears a red robe and hat that covers most of his face. When he attacks, he throws smoke bombs. His appearance is said to resemble a Chinese zombie.
- Li Jen: Lee's final opponent, Li Jen wears a white robe and has an uncanny resemblance to Flash Gordon's Ming the Merciless. Li Jen's area is surrounded by a thunder storm and Lee must avoid the lightning to attack Li Jen and save China.

== Reception ==
Commodore User gave the Commodore 64 version of Yie Ar Kung-Fu II an overall score of seven out of ten, calling it an improvement upon its predecessor. While noting it as "nothing special" among other, similar beat 'em ups due to its "limited" fighting moves, Commodore User heavily praised Yie Ar Kung-Fu II's "polished" & "colourful" graphics, as well as its "excellent" animations and "fantastic" sound.
