= List of people known as the Stubborn =

"The Stubborn" is an epithet given to:

- Louis X of France (1289–1316), King of France and King of Navarre
- William I, Count of Burgundy (1020–1087), also Count of Mâcon
- Thorkell the Stubborn, in Scandinavian sagas the slayer of Veborg, a shieldmaiden

== See also ==
- Homero Cárdenas Guillén (1966–2014?), Mexican suspected drug lord, one of whose aliases was "El Majadero" ("The Stubborn One")
