= Hard Head =

1988 Video game

- Developer: SunA Electronics
- Publisher: SunA Electronics
- Platform: Arcade
- Release: WW: September 14, 1988
- Genre: Platform
- Modes: Single-player, multiplayer

Hard Head (stylized as HAP.D HEAD), originally known in Korea as Dr. Bulgehead (Korean: 짱구 박사), is an obscure 2D side-scrolling arcade platform game developed and published by SunA Electronics of an unknown team of game designers/programmers. The original title and characters were loosely based on a comic book series of the same name, created by painter Woo-young Koh with his author and brother Woo-young Go.

The game is internationally released only for the arcades from South Korea to arcades worldwide during the 1988 Summer Olympics.

== Gameplay ==
The gameplay and visuals are similar to Famicom games such as Super Mario Bros. (1985) but with a more bizarre and offbeat twist, as well as an unusual storyline. Player(s) take the roles of the two titular protagonists who are on a quest in a fictionalized village of Austria to please their female companion and fight off enemies.

Similar to Bubble Bobble (1986), the Head Twins are able to use bubble-guns to entrap inexplicable hazards such as Tribal Indians, chicks, scissors, bandits, toothbrush, insects, snails, larva, cat like creatures, little purple skulls, and monsters so they can jump on their heads to knock them off the stage, they can also find bombs and steel mallets to clobber anything in their paths, which is also a homage to Wrecking Crew (1985).

The twins live up to their names by using their protruding and powerful heads to break blocks, some of which contain items and power-ups, other times, there is a heart-shaped collectible that must be obtained during each stages which would show an animation played of their lover having a deeply intimate moment with one of the heroes by kissing them after stripping down, the heart erases all enemies off the screen while raising the player's score. Levels go from start to finish by surpassing each time limits and finding soccer balls to kick through each goal for bonus points.

There are a total of 16 levels to traverse from. The game can be played in either single player mode or cooperative mode, allowing Player 2 to control the second twin brother whenever they choose to join the gameplay, both players must progress each level at the same time or encounter monstrous-looking bosses. If one stands still the other can only move a few steps before the screen will not scroll any farther.

Note: (There is a cultural error in the first boss battle where in the stage background features the Flag of Australia instead of the Flag of Austria.)

== Characters ==
- Head Twins (헤드 트윈)
  - The names of the three-haired Austrian heroic duo are Hard Head (하드 헤드) who dons red lederhosen, alongside his twin brother Dr. Bulgehead (짱구 박사) who dons cyan lederhosen. Armed with bubble guns, sledgehammers, bombs, and super strong big-heads; the duo embarks on a romantic and courageous adventure to collect goods, battle creatures and monsters, and to please their girlfriend.
- Girlfriend (여자 친구)
  - The yellow-haired lover of Hard Head (and apparently Dr. Bulgehead), she is a female hippie who wears a red dirndlkleid and appears at the end of all 16 phases, followed by an additional big-headed spawn, with legs, and bugged-out glasses for each phase passed, until she has all 16. There is a color-palette error in the "cutscenes" of the girlfriend having gray hair like an elderly woman.

== Music ==
Classical music is extensively used as the soundtrack for this game. Edited extracts from Tchaikovsky's Swan Lake Op. 20 (1st movement), Mozart's 40th Symphony K. 550 (1st movement), and Chopin's Fantaisie-Impromptu Op. 66 can repeatedly be heard through the game.

== Reception ==
Advanced Computer Entertainment compared the game to Super Mario Bros. and called it "unoriginal but addicting fun." Your Sinclair also compared the game to Super Mario Bros., calling it a tribute to Nintendo's game. They also made note of the game's offbeat humor, saying that the game was a "good laugh" and "exactly the same as one of the funniest computer games ever." They rated the game an 8 out of 10.

== Legacy ==
=== Bootleg ===
A hacked version of this game titled "POPPER" was manufactured and released in 1989, but it is unknown of what region it was developed and produced from.

=== Sequel ===
In 1991, a second installment was released, titled Hard Head 2, originally titled Dr. Bulgehead 2 (짱구 박사 2). It was released in North America by Space Age Electronics. Unlike the original game, Hard Head 2 has similar gameplay to other arcade platform games such as Ghouls 'n Ghosts (1988) and Toki (1989). In the game's story, Hard Head is dancing with his girlfriend until all of a sudden, the devil of hell rises and holds her hostage in his mouth. In between levels, the devil chews on Hard Head’s girlfriend, then he heroically says "I am going to rescue you, may you being safe!...". Hard Head once again enlists the help of his twin brother Dr. Bulgehead to the rescue, they both can take two hits from any foe. After one hit, the hero(s) lose their overalls and runs around only in their foot-wear. New weapons have been added: a kanabō and a morning star. Also, now the heroes can pick up wings, which make them able to glide by holding the jump button down.

== Other games ==
Throughout the years, SunA Electronics have released 20 other different arcade cabinets since 1985. Listed here are the other arcade machines made by SunA Electronics before and after the time period that Hard Head 1 and 2 were produced:

- 블록 - Block (Arkanoid bootleg) (1986)
- 고인돌 - GoinDol (1987)
- 슈퍼 레인저 - Super Ranger (Rolling Thunder bootleg) (1988)
  - 러프 레인저 - Rough Ranger (Sharp Image licence) (1988)
- 스파크맨 - Spark Man (1989)
- 스타 파이터 - Star Fighter (1990)
- 브릭 존 - Brick Zone (1992)
- 격투 (Gyeoktu) - Best of Best (1994)
- 퀴즈6000아카데미 - Quiz 6000 Academy (1994)
- 프랙챔피온 - Flag Champion (1995)
  - 업다운챔피온 - Up Down Champion (1995)
- 퀴즈 토피아 - Quiz Topia (1995)
- 백스트리스사커 - Back Street Soccer (1996)
- 울트라바룬 - Ultra Balloon (1996)
- 탱고탱고 - Tango Tango (1998)
- 위너라인 - Winner Line (1999)
- 파이프라인 - Pipeline (1999)
- Redemption games (1997-2005)
- 고 2000 - GO 2000 (2000)
