= Z88DK =

Cross compiler for Z80-based computers

- Developer: Dominic Morris et al.
- Initial release: 1998; 28 years ago
- Stable release: 2.3 / December 2023; 2 years ago
- Written in: ANSI C
- Operating system: Multiplatform
- Type: Cross compiler
- License: Artistic License
- Website: z88dk.org

Z88DK is a Small-C-derived cross compiler for a long list of Z80 based computers. The name derives from the fact that it was originally developed to target the Cambridge Z88. Z88DK is a collection of software development tools that targets the Z80 / 8080 / 8085 family of machines. It allows development of programs in C, assembly language or any mixture of the two. What makes z88dk unique is its ease of use, built-in support for many Z80 machines and its extensive set of assembly language library subroutines implementing the C standard and extensions.

It has been used for many software and hardware projects, notably the REX DK (targeted to the REX 6000 platform) and the S1 SDK (targeted to the S1 MP3 Player) teams.

The compiler is highly portable, and is known to run on AmigaOS, BeOS, HP-UX 9, Linux, BSD, Mac OS X, Solaris, Win64, Win32, Win16 and MS-DOS.

== Supported target platforms ==
As of the time of writing Z88DK supports the following target platforms:

- Amstrad CPC
- Amstrad NC100
- Amstrad NC200
- Cambridge Z88
- Camputers Lynx
- Canon X-07
- Casio PV-1000
- Casio PV-2000
- CCE MC-1000
- Commodore 128 (in Z80 mode)
- CP/M based machines
- EACA Colour Genie EG2000
- Enterprise 64 and 128
- Epson PX-4
- Epson PX-8
- Exidy Sorcerer
- Galaksija
- Grundy NewBrain
- Jupiter Ace
- Lambda 8300
- Luxor ABC 80
- Luxor ABC 800
- Master System
- Mattel Aquarius
- Memotech MTX
- MSX
- NABU
- Nascom 1 and 2
- NEC PC-6001
- NEC PC-8801
- Pac-Man arcade hardware
- Philips P2000
- Philips VG5000
- C7420 module for the Philips Videopac + G7400
- RC2014
- Rabbit 2000/3000/4000 platform
- SAM Coupé
- Small Computer Central
- SG-1000
- Sharp MZ series
- Sharp OZ/QZ 700 family palmtop organizers
- Sharp X1
- Sord M5
- S-OS
- Spectravideo SVI
- Peters Plus Sprinter
- Tatung Einstein
- TI calculators (TI-82, TI-83 series, TI-84 Plus series, TI-85, TI-86)
- Timex Sinclair 2068
- Toshiba Pasopia 7
- TRS 80
- VTech VZ200/300 (also known as Laser 200)
- Xircom REX 6000 (also known as DataSlim)
- YAZ180
- ZX Spectrum
- ZX80
- ZX81

== See also ==
- Retargetable compiler
- Microcontroller
- SDCC - C compiler for various 8-bit processors
- cc65 – Cross Small-C implementation for 6502 / 65C02 processors
