= REX 6000 =

Personal digital assistant by Xircom / Intel

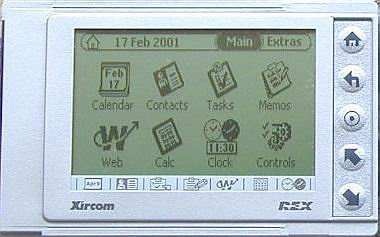
- Manufacturer: Xircom; Intel
- Type: Personal Digital Assistant
- Website: intel.com at the Wayback Machine (archived 2002-06-14)

The REX 6000 is an ultra-thin Personal Digital Assistant (PDA) produced by Xircom, and later Intel, from about 2000 to 2001. The REX may be synchronized by inserting it in a host PC's PCMCIA/PC-card slot. Docking stations were manufactured for connection to hosts without PC card Type-II slots, which allows the REX to be connected via a USB or serial connection.

The REX 6000 is the successor to the Franklin REX 5000, with a notable difference being the addition of a touch screen. In addition, it is possible to remove and install executable code (including both custom applications and the operating system itself). As with the earlier models, the REX 6000 hardware was developed by the Citizen Watch Company of Japan, marketed as the "DataSlim-2". The firmware for previous REX models was written by Starfish Software, but the REX 6000, though modeled on previous versions, included a complete re-write of the firmware.

The REX 6000 does not support handwriting recognition and to enter data, a virtual keyboard is used. The standard REX 6000 has an American keyboard layout, although third-party software allows for other keyboard layouts. The pre-installed software for the Rex consists of the following:

- Calendar
- Address book
- To-do list
- Notebook
- World clock
- Calculator

Third-party software ("add-ins") include games, painting programs, spreadsheets and replacements or improvements of the pre-installed software. Most third-party software was developed by users with customized versions of the Z88DK compiler or the Small Device C Compiler (SDCC).

The earliest release of the REX 6000 had 1 MB of flash memory, while later releases doubled this to 2 MB. (Earlier REXes stored user data in RAM with the operating system in ROM.) The REX has 32 KB of RAM, but only 12 KB is available for application developers. It uses a 4.3 MHz Toshiba microprocessor compatible to the Zilog Z80, has a 240 × 120 pixel monochrome LCD, and is capable of providing beep sounds to deliver alarms and reminders. The REX 6000 is powered by two button-type CR2016 lithium cells .

Around 2002 Intel acquired Xircom and subsequently discontinued this product line.
