= Small Device C Compiler =

C compiler for microcontrollers

- Developers: Sandeep Dutta and others
- Stable release: 4.6.0 / June 22, 2026; 2 months ago
- Operating system: Microsoft Windows, macOS, Linux
- Type: C compiler
- License: GPL
- Website: sdcc.sf.net
- Repository: sf.net/p/sdcc/code/

The Small Device C Compiler (SDCC) is a free-software, partially retargetable C compiler for 8-bit microcontrollers. It is distributed under the GNU General Public License. The package also contains an assembler, linker, simulator and debugger. SDCC is a popular open-source C compiler for microcontrollers compatible with Intel 8051/MCS-51.

Version 4.6.0 added e.g. "C2y _Countof operator", octal, and if-declaration, "Conditional operator with omitted second operand (originally a GNU extension)"; C23 compound literals with storage class specifiers and "C23 constexpr (mostly)"

== Supported hosts ==
Sources, documentation, and binaries are available for Linux (32-bit and 64-bit), macOS (PPC and 64-bit), and Windows (32-bit and 64-bit).

== Supported targets ==
The following include binary compatible derivatives:

- Intel 8031, 8032, 8051, 8052; Maxim/Dallas DS80C390; C8051
- Motorola/Freescale/NXP 68HC08 and S08
- Padauk PDK14 and PDK15
- Sharp SM83, the CPU found in the Nintendo Game Boy LR35902 SoC
- STMicroelectronics STM8
- Zilog Z80, Z180, eZ80 in Z80 mode; Rabbit Semiconductor 2000, 2000A, 3000, 3000A, 4000, 6000; Toshiba TLCS-90; Z80N (ZX Spectrum Next processor), R800.
- MOS Technology 6502, WDC 65C02.

Work in progress:

- Microchip PIC16 and PIC18.
- Padauk PDK13.

Obsolete:

- AVR microcontrollers used to be a supported target, but was made obsolete by avr-gcc in 2010 (SDCC 3.0.0).

== See also ==
- Z88DK - C compiler for Z80 / 8080 / 8085 systems
- cc65 - C compiler for 6502 / 65C02 systems
