= Toshiba Pasopia 16 =

Computer system by Toshiba

- Also known as: PA7020, T300, PAP
- Type: IBM PC compatible
- Released: 1982
- Operating system: MS-DOS 2.3; CP/M-86 (optional)
- CPU: Intel 8088-2 @ 6 MHz
- Memory: 192 KB (expandable to 256 KB)
- Removable storage: Floppy disks
- Display: 320 × 200, 640 × 200, 640 × 400, 640 × 500; 8 or 16 colors
- Graphics: Color Graphic Card (128KB, 8 colors); Extended Graphic Card (256KB, 16 out of 256 colors)
- Successor: J-3100
- Related: Toshiba Pasopia 1600, Pasopia 1600 TS100 / 300

Toshiba Pasopia 16 or PA7020 (also known as T300 in the U.S. and PAP in Europe) is an IBM PC compatible computer from manufacturer Toshiba, released in 1982 and based around a Intel 8088-2 microprocessor running at 6 MHz.

== Details ==
The operating system was MS-DOS 2.3 with CP/M-86 as an option. The machine included GW-BASIC, communication (Pap.Com) and graphics (Pap.Graph) software. The computer came with two 5.25" disk drives and supported an optional 8087 co-processor.

Two graphic cards were available: a Color Graphic Card with 128KB and 8 colors; an Extended Graphic Card with 256KB of memory and 16 colors out of 256. Several graphics modes are possible: 640 × 500, 640 × 400, 640 × 200 and 320 × 200.

The European PAP model had a SCART connector with RGB output. A green monochrome monitor was also available. Possible peripherals for this model are extra 5.25" disk drives, a hard disk, a RS-232 interface and a printer. The keyboard has 103 keys.

== Other models ==
=== Toshiba Pasopia 1600 ===
An expanded model, the Toshiba Pasopia 1600 (PA7030) was released in 1984. The basic specifications are the same as the base model, but the CPU is an Intel 8086-2 running at 8 MHz, and graphic memory was expanded to 384 KB. The machine is smaller and the number of expansion slots was reduced to two. A mouse and JS-WORD came as standard equipment, along with a screen editor software. Several types of floppy and hard drives were available.

=== Pasopia 1600 TS100 / 300 ===
Another variation was the Pasopia 1600 TS100 / 300 with a 80286 CPU running at 8 MHz and 704 KB of RAM. It came with MS-DOS 2.11, two 5.25" floppy disk drives (TS100 version) or a single 5.25" floppy disk drive and a 20 MB hard drive (TS300 version). After this, Toshiba starts the J-3100 series of personal computers.

== See also ==
- Toshiba Pasopia
- Toshiba Pasopia 5
- Toshiba Pasopia 7
- Toshiba Pasopia IQ
