= Advanced Dungeons & Dragons: Treasure of Tarmin =

1983 video game

- Intellivision box art
- Developer: APh Technological Consulting
- Publisher: Mattel Electronics
- Series: Dungeons & Dragons
- Platforms: Intellivision, Mattel Aquarius
- Release: October 1983
- Genre: Role-playing
- Mode: Single-player

Advanced Dungeons & Dragons: Treasure of Tarmin is a role-playing video game by Tom Loughry for the Intellivision and Mattel Aquarius. This game was a licensed Dungeons & Dragons adaptation and a successor to Advanced Dungeons & Dragons: Cloudy Mountain (1982).

== Gameplay ==
In Treasure of Tarmin, the player wanders through a multi-tiered dungeon, each level consisting of a 10x10 maze square and its surrounding hallway making it a 12x12 square maze with the hallway included. The objective is to slay the Minotaur who guards the Treasure of Tarmin and take his treasure chest.

The catalog gives the following description of Advanced Dungeons & Dragons: Treasure of Tarmin:

"You've found the secret map to the underground lair of the dreaded Minotaur. You can go in, but you'll never come out unless you slay the Minotaur and claim his Tarmin treasure. As you make your way through the hallways and chambers, monsters wield their conventional or spiritual weapons. You must gather the proper defenses along the way. But use them sparingly, the Minotaur looms closer!"

While the battles were turn-based, Advanced Dungeons & Dragons: Treasure of Tarmin is different from most games of its era, as it involved a first-person view, giving it a three-dimensional feel. The player begins the game with the lowest-level bow, a small supply of food, a number of arrows dependent on the selected difficulty level, and minimal "Spiritual" and "War" health. Randomly placed throughout the maze are new weapons, armor, magical items, and treasure. The treasure in the maze (aside from the Treasure of Tarmin the Minotaur holds) can either boost the player's score (visible from the map screen), contain a potion (blue, pink, or purple in large and small varieties), or a bomb reducing the player's war/spiritual score. The bomb can cause a game over depending on the strength of the player at the time of the explosion.

=== Types of threats ===
The alternating wall panels created a convincing 3-D world.

Each enemy (besides the Minotaur) can be found in three colors, signifying different levels of difficulty.

- Skeletons: The weakest enemy in the game. They attack the player's War health and are very easy to defeat. Cloaked skeletons are more difficult to defeat. Both regular and cloaked skeletons may have shields, which increase their difficulty.
- Giants: The other primary enemy to attack only the player's War health. They can have shields as well and are more difficult than Skeletons.
- Giant Ants: The weakest of the enemies that attack the player's Spiritual health.
- Dwarfs: Similar to Giants in their difficulty as well as attack. Dwarfs come either with or without shields, but attack only the player's Spiritual health.
- Giant Scorpions: Mid-level enemies that attack the player's Spiritual health.
- Giant Snakes: Giant Snakes attack the player's Spiritual health and have more health than Giant Scorpions.
- Alligators: The next more difficult of the Spiritual-attacking enemies.
- Dragons: The most difficult of the Spiritual enemies.
- Ghouls: These do not appear in the game until the player has gone several levels down. They may attack either the player's War or Spiritual health during the battle. On the easier two difficulties, its type of attack is determined randomly, but on the harder two difficulties, it attacks the weaker health.
- Wraiths: These are more difficult than Ghouls and can be either shielded or normal. Deeper into the dungeon, Wraiths can become harder to defeat than the Minotaur itself.
- Minotaur: This is the "end boss" of the game, and it only appears in one color (purple). It attacks both Spiritual and War health. Upon defeating the Minotaur, it will drop the Treasure of Tarmin; the Treasure can be picked up to end the game or ignored to continue playing. Additional Minotaurs show up on lower levels and often even in the same level.
- "Door Monsters": These special creatures look like doors and hide the three spellbooks. Blue (the weakest) gives a book that teleports through walls. Pink gives a book that allows vision through walls. Purple tends to strike with high-end Spirit weapons and gives a book that turns ordinary items to platinum (thus making any war weapon or treasure the highest value possible).
- Bombs: Some treasure chests and bags contain small or large bombs that explode to cause war damage.

=== Situations ===
- To increase health, the player must either attack or be attacked by enemies, followed by resting (consuming a food item), which has a chance to increase either war or spiritual health based on the weapons the player has used. With the aid of Spirit or War tomes found in treasure chests, this chance may be increased greatly. The player's maximum health (with the aid of maximum-health limit increasing books and potions) is 199 War points and 99 Spiritual.
- In the outer hallways, gates between adjacent mazes on the same level may be encountered. Passing through a green gate reduces the player's spiritual health and boosts the player's health, and the opposite effect occurs when passing through a blue gate. Use in conjunction with war or spiritual books can boost respective health significantly. Passing through a tan gate changes nothing.
- The player may continue going down levels (by accessing a ladder located inside each maze) until level 256, after which the game cycles back to level 1. The player character retains their health and inventory contents, and can attack enemies at the first floor's easier difficulty.
- It is possible to be defeated, but not lose the game. Upon dying, the player can be 'reincarnated' to another section of that maze, with all of their pack's inventory gone while retaining the contents of their weapon and shield slots as well as their supply of arrows and food.

== Publication history ==
The game was written by Tom Loughry in 1981 and was published by Mattel in October 1983. Treasure of Tarmin was the second AD&D game for the Intellivision, after Advanced Dungeons & Dragons: Cloudy Mountain. A version was also released for the Mattel Aquarius home computer.

In 1983, Mattel Electronics commissioned an Atari 2600 version of Treasure of Tarmin. This was developed by Synth Corporation in Chicago. Two Synth software developers, Michael Bengtson and Neal Reynolds, wrote the game to conform to the play of the Intellivision version. While the game was completed, it was not released before Mattel Electronics closed their doors.

== Reception ==
German gaming magazine TeleMatch gave the game a positive review, giving it a one and a half out of six (on their rating system one is the highest), stating, "Advanced Dungeons & Dragons is already the outstanding pinnacle of Intellivision-Cassettes, but Treasure of Tarmin raises the bar even further" and, "at least for the German market, no other video game of this type exists ... What happens next is almost unbelievable: you yourself are the adventurer, and you're not represented by a symbol of a small man on the screen, rather you see what one would see if one was walking". TeleMatch was also impressed by the number of levels in the game, and felt that the awarding of points for defeating monsters was rewarding.

In a retrospective review of Treasure of Tarmin in Black Gate, Ty Johnston said "this is a game worth playing, loaded with thrills and fun".
