= Deep Blue C =

Deep Blue C is a C programming language compiler for Atari 8-bit computers distributed by the Atari Program Exchange (APX).

== Description ==
Deep Blue C is based on Ron Cain's public domain Small-C compiler, a subset of the C programming language, modified by John Howard Palevich to run on Atari 8-bit hardware. Palevich also wrote Dandy for APX. The syntax supported by Deep Blue C is close to that of ANSI C with significant limitations. The compiler creates Intel 8080 binary code which is executed by an 8080 virtual machine as p-code.

The user must supply a source code editor, but included libraries provide printf and other I/O routines and video graphics, including player/missile graphics. The source code to the compiler was sold separately by APX as Deep Blue Secrets.

== Limitations ==
As a proper subset of V7 Unix C, Deep Blue C code that does not use Atari 8-bit features can be compiled on other systems with the full language. The following language constructs are not supported:

- structs
- unions
- multidimensional arrays
- floating point numbers
- sizeof operator
- type casting
- functions returning types other than integer

Other non-standard properties of Deep Blue C:

- The last part of switch clause must end with: break, continue, or return.
- The maximum length of a source code line has to be less than 80 characters.
- The number of arguments for functions cannot exceed 126.
- $( and $) are used instead of { and }, because the Atari keyboard and standard character set does not include braces.

The p-code that the compiler produces is slower than native binary. It is smaller than binary, however, and faster than Atari BASIC.

== Reception ==
Antic thought that Deep Blue C's use of p-code was acceptable given Atari's hardware limitations. The magazine praised Palevich for publishing the source code, and recommended purchasing it with the compiler for study and customization alongside The C Programming Language.

== Sample program ==
This program prints "Hello World!":

 main()
 $(
   printf("Hello World!");
 $)
