= Small-C =

Subset of a programming language

- Developers: Ron Cain, James E. Hendrix
- Initial release: 1980; 46 years ago
- Written in: C programming language
- Type: Compiler
- License: Copyrighted but sharable

Small-C is both a subset of the C programming language, suitable for resource-limited microcomputers and embedded systems, and an implementation of that subset. Originally valuable as an early compiler for microcomputer systems available during the late 1970s and early 1980s, the implementation has also been useful as an example simple enough for teaching purposes.

The original compiler, written in Small-C for the Intel 8080 by Ron Cain, appeared in the May 1980 issue of Dr. Dobb's Journal. James E. Hendrix improved and extended the original compiler, and wrote The Small-C Handbook. Ron bootstrapped Small-C on the SRI International PDP 11/45 Unix system with an account provided by John Bass for Small C development. The provided source code was released with management permission into the public domain. Small-C was important for tiny computers in a manner somewhat analogous to the importance of GCC for larger computers. Just like its Unix counterparts, the compiler generates assembler code, which then must be translated to machine code by an available assembler.

Small-C is a retargetable compiler. Porting Small-C requires only that the back-end code generator and the library to operating system interface calls be rewritten for the target processor.

== Language subset ==
The original Small-C compiler excluded many features from standard C for minimalism. Types are limited to char and int, while Arrays of these types are restricted to one dimensional arrays only. The only loop statement that is available is the While loop. Boolean operators were not included, meaning that logical statements had to be done with the equivalent bitwise operators, of which only AND and OR were given. Compilation was done in one pass with no optimization, although one could provide the compiler with an optimizer to use.

A second version, now called Version 2.1, of the Small-C compiler was later developed by James E. Hendix, extending Small-C with many features commonly used in C. The new compiler optimized code by default and allowed preprocessor directives for conditional compilation. Added features include boolean operators, For loops, Do while loops, Switch statements, and Gotos. This allowed programming much closer to standard C.

Rick Grehan ported Small-C to MS-DOS and Macintosh in 1988 for a new version of the BYTE benchmarks.

== See also ==
- BDS C (1979) – C compiler for Z80 and 8080 systems
- MISOSYS C (1985) - C compiler for TRS-80 (Z80 CPU)
- Tiny C (2002) – C compiler for slow x86 and ARM computers having little disk space

=== Small-C variants ===
- Z88DK – Cross Small-C implementation for Z80 / 8080 / 8085 computers
- cc65 – Cross Small-C implementation for 6502 / 65C02 computers
- Deep Blue C – Small-C for the Atari 8-bit computers
- Thunder C – Small-C for the UCSD p-System
- A.J.Travis – Native Small-C for the BBC Micro computer
- Clarkson College of Technology - For Z-DOS on Zenith Z-100

== Notes ==
- Ron Cain, "A Small C Compiler for the 8080's", Dr. Dobb's Journal, April–May 1980, pp. 5–19
- James E. Hendrix, The Small-C Handbook, Reston 1984, ISBN 0-8359-7012-4
- James E. Hendrix, A Small C Compiler: Language, Usage, Theory, and Design, M & T Books 1988, ISBN 0-934375-88-7
- James E. Hendrix, Small C Compiler, M & T Books 1990, ISBN 1-55851-124-5
