= TEA1002 =

PAL video encoder chip produced by Mullard in 1982

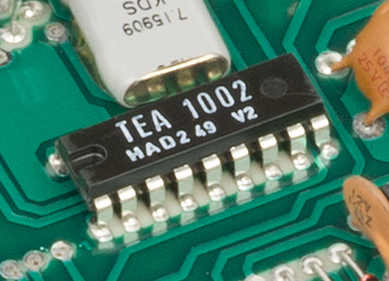
TEA1002 on a Mattel Aquarius motherboard

The TEA1002 is a PAL video encoder chip produced by Mullard in 1982 and used on the Mattel Aquarius computer, the AlphaTantel Prestel adapter and the Microvector 256 color graphics display interface for Nascom and Gemini computers. It was also used on teletext decoders and color bar generators associated with video test equipment.

It generates 16 colors based on Luminance, Chrominance and Saturation, usually with the 8 basic colors being similar to the EBU 75% color bars.

== Levels ==
According to the TEA1002 datasheet, colors are formed by the combination of three signals, roughly equivalent to the HSL colorspace:

- Luminance
- Chroma phase (º, equivalent to hue angle)
- Chroma amplitude (%, equivalent to saturation)

Internally colors are stored in a 4-bit RGBI arrangement. There are three bits for the RGB components (generating 8 primary colors at full saturation but 75% luminance - similar to the EBU colour bars) and an inverter logic input bit that controls a variation of the base color (a 25% Luminance decrease for white; a 50% Chroma saturation decrease for all colors).

The following table lists the internal signals and shows an approximation of the generated colors, as seen on a web standard sRGB monitor. Colors could be different when seen on an analog PAL CRT television.

TEA1002 Logic inputs and composite video output (configured for 75% EBU colour bars)
Color	R	G	B	INV	Luminance (%)	Chroma (º)	Chroma (%)
Black	0	0	0	0	0.0	-	-
Red	1	0	0	0	22.5	103	±48
Green	0	1	0	0	44.0	241	±44
Yellow	1	1	0	0	66.5	167	±33
Blue	0	0	1	0	8.5	347	±33
Magenta	1	0	1	0	31.0	61	±44
Cyan	0	1	1	0	52.5	283	±48
White	1	1	1	0	100.0	-	-
Grey	0	0	0	1	75.0	-	-
Cyan	1	0	0	1	52.5	283	±24
Magenta	0	1	0	1	31.0	61	±22
Blue	1	1	0	1	8.5	347	±17
Yellow	0	0	1	1	66.5	167	±17
Green	1	0	0	1	44.0	241	±22
Red	0	1	1	1	22.5	103	±24
Black	1	1	1	1	0.0	-	-

An alternate configuration of the chip allows it to output 95% luminance color bars - similar to BBC colour bars, more suited for usage in teletext decoders.

TEA1002 Logic inputs and composite video output (configured for 95% BBC colour bars)
Color	R	G	B	INV	Luminance (%)	Chroma (º)	Chroma (%)
Black	0	0	0	0	0.0	-	-
Red	1	0	0	0	47.5	103	±48
Green	0	1	0	0	69	241	±44
Yellow	1	1	0	0	91.5	167	±33
Blue	0	0	1	0	33.5	347	±33
Magenta	1	0	0	0	56	61	±44
Cyan	0	1	1	0	77.5	283	±48
White	1	1	1	0	100.0	-	-
Grey	0	0	0	1	100.0	-	-
Cyan	1	0	0	1	77.5	283	±24
Magenta	0	1	0	1	56	61	±22
Blue	1	1	0	1	33.5	347	±17
Yellow	0	0	1	1	91.5	167	±17
Green	1	0	0	1	69	241	±22
Red	0	1	1	1	47.5	103	±24
Black	1	1	1	1	0.0	-	-

== See also ==
- Thomson EF9345
- Motorola 6845
- TMS9918
- MOS Technology VIC-II
- List of home computers by video hardware
