= Dirk Gates =

American business executive

- Born: June 25, 1961 (age 65)
- Education: California State University, Northridge (BS); Pepperdine University (MBA)
- Occupations: CEO of Xircom and Xirrus

Dirk I. Gates (born June 25, 1961, in Fort Wayne, Indiana) is an American businessman, founder and chief executive officer of two companies, Xircom and Xirrus.

== Career ==
In 1983, Gates received a Bachelor of Science in Engineering from California State University, Northridge and then completed the MBA program at Pepperdine University in 1990 at the age of 27 while co-founding his first company, Xircom, with fellow entrepreneur Kirk Mathews. Xircom created the industry's first product Ethernet Pocket Adapter which allowed notebook computers to connect to Ethernet LANs, along with the industry's first Type III PC Card called the RealPort that allowed users to connect Ethernet cables and phone cables directly to the notebook without the use of dongles.

Gates served as Xircom’s president after its launch in November 1988, became chief executive officer in 1991, and in 1995, he became chairman of the company. In March 2001, after 13 years in operation, Gates negotiated the sale of Xircom to Intel Corporation for US$748 million. Gates served as vice president and general manager of mobile communications at Intel and then went on to co-found Xirrus, a Wi-Fi technology company, in early 2004 with Patrick Parker and Steve DeGennaro. He served as the Chief Executive Officer of Xirrus until June 2012, at which point he assumed the role of Executive Chairman. Xirrus designs and sells wireless networking equipment called Wi-Fi Arrays based on the IEEE standards 802.11a, 802.11b, 802.11g, and 802.11n.

In 1992, Gates was honored as High Technology Entrepreneur of the Year for the Greater Los Angeles area and in 1994, made Forbes Magazine's Whiz Kid list of the five youngest CEOs of the Best small Companies in America. Dirk appeared on the Dylan Ratigan show on MSNBC in September 2010 and in January 2011, Gates was featured in a Kym McNicholas segment on ForbesTV. He has also given countless speeches and presentations on Wi-Fi including the keynote address at Interop New York 2010. Gates has been a member of the CSUN Foundation Board, has served as Chairman of the Viewpoint School Board of Trustees, and is also a member of the Pepperdine Board of Visitors. In 1997, Dirk Gates donated $1 million (apiece) of his personal funds to CSUN and Pepperdine University to express his gratitude for the knowledge he acquired during his schooling.

== Personal life ==
Gates is an avid member of the high-power rocketry community, frequently flying large model rockets in California and Nevada. To facilitate his hobby, Gates started a side company, Gates Brothers Rocketry, with his brother, Erik Gates. The duo appeared on several episodes of the popular Discovery Channel TV series MythBusters that involved rocketry, including the pilot episode.

== Sources ==
- "Foundation - Volunteer Board Members - California State University Northridge". 2009-07-24. Archived from the original on 2009-07-24.
