= Toshiba Pasopia =

Computer system by Toshiba

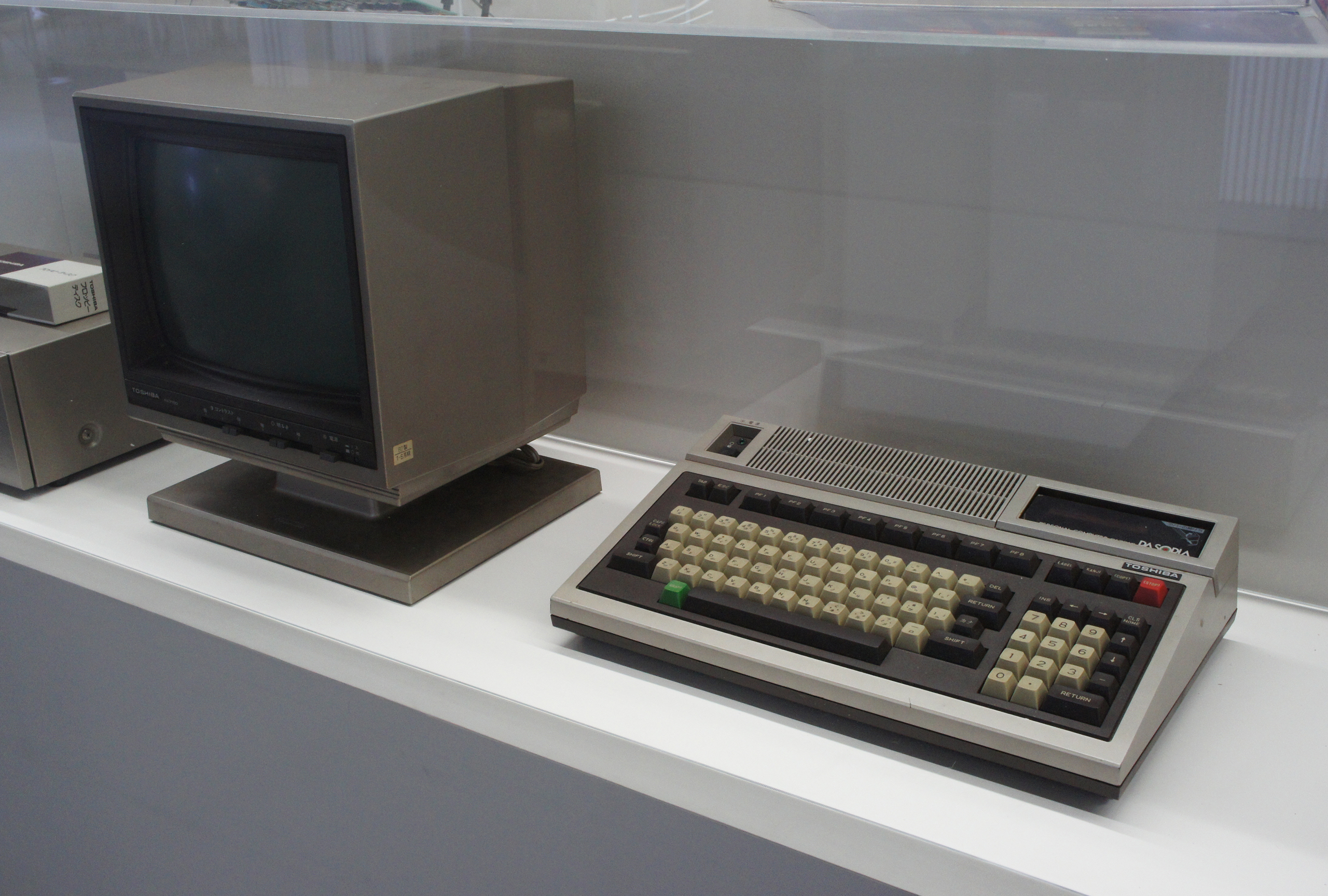
- Also known as: PA7010, PA7012, Toshiba T100
- Type: Home computer
- Released: 1981
- Operating system: PA7010: T-BASIC; PA7012: OA-BASIC
- CPU: Zilog Z80A @ 4 MHz
- Memory: 64 KB RAM; 16 KB VRAM
- Graphics: 160 x 100, 640 x 200; 8 colors (RGB primaries)
- Sound: 3 octaves (built-in speaker)
- Successor: Pasopia 5, Pasopia 7

Toshiba Pasopia is a computer from manufacturer Toshiba, released in 1981 and based around a Zilog Z80 microprocessor.

There are two models, the PA7010 and the PA7012. PA7010 comes with T-BASIC, a version of Microsoft BASIC. PA7012 comes with the more powerful built-in operating system - OA-BASIC developed by Toshiba, capable of sequential file access and automated loading of programs. The keyboard has 90 keys, a separate numeric keypad and eight function keys. The machine could be expanded with disk drives, extra RAM and offered a RS-232 and a parallel printer port.

In 1982 the machine was sold on the American market as Toshiba T100. It had an optional LCD screen (with 320 x 64 resolution) that fitted into the keyboard. Two CRT monitors were available: a 13" green monochrome, and 15" RGB color. 1982 models came with T-BASIC version 1.1.

The machine supported cartridge-type peripherals called PAC, RAM packs with battery backup, Kanji ROM packs and joystick ports. Pascal and OA-BASIC cartridges were on sale.

In 1983 Toshiba released the Pasopia 5 and Pasopia 7, intended as successors to the original Pasopia.

A dedicated magazine, named "Oh! Pasopia" was published in Japan between 1983 and 1987.

== See also ==
- Toshiba Pasopia 5
- Toshiba Pasopia 7
- Toshiba Pasopia 16 (IBM PC compatible)
- Toshiba Pasopia IQ (MSX compatible)
