= Advanced Dungeons & Dragons: Cloudy Mountain =

1982 video game

- Original cover before the game was retitled
- Developer: Mattel Electronics
- Publisher: Mattel Electronics
- Series: Dungeons & Dragons
- Platform: Intellivision
- Release: August 16, 1982
- Genre: Action-adventure
- Mode: Single-player

Advanced Dungeons & Dragons is an Intellivision game and was one of the first Advanced Dungeons & Dragons games to be licensed by TSR, Inc. It was later retitled to Advanced Dungeons & Dragons: Cloudy Mountain to distinguish it from the sequel, Advanced Dungeons & Dragons: Treasure of Tarmin. It is the first Intellivision cartridge to use more than 4K of ROM.

== Plot ==
In Advanced Dungeons & Dragons, the player must cross difficult terrain, reach the resting place of a broken crown, and restore the crown. During the game, the player will navigate randomly generated rooms and corridors within a mountain range, collect items, and fend off monsters. The player's only weapon is a bow and arrow, which can be fired in any of eight directions by pressing the number-pad keys on the Intellivision controller.

== Gameplay ==
The player character inside a maze

Gameplay involves exploring a series of randomly generated scrolling mazes, seeking treasures and weapons with which to defeat monsters, and recovering the two pieces of the Crown of Kings. The speed of the monsters and the quantity of available arrows are determined by the difficulty setting. The player starts in a cabin on one side of a wilderness map. On the other side is an enormous mountain containing the crown, topped by clouds and inhabited by sleeping dragons. Smaller mountains and geographical obstacles block the way to the goal. Some mountains are impassable, while others turn different colors as the player approaches them to indicate their difficulty level.

When the player enters a mountain, the screen changes to an overhead view of a maze of rooms within it. The player is represented by a black stick figure with a bow who must move from one room to another. Rooms and connecting passages initially cannot be seen, but they gradually light up as the player moves into them. The player must avoid or defeat monsters, collect items, and find an exit in order to return to the map screen. The difficulty level of the mountain determines the types of monsters and items that can be found inside. The player starts with three arrows, but can find more as the game progresses.

Items include:

- Quiver: Adds arrows to the player's inventory.
- Boat: Required to move along the rivers on the map.
- Axe: Required to move through the forests on the map.
- Key: Required to pass the gates in the walls on the map.
- Crown: Found only in Cloudy Mountain; both halves must be obtained to win the game.

Quivers can be found in any mountain, while each of the other three items can only be found in mountains of one specific color (blue mountains for the boat, red mountains for the axe, and purple mountains for the key).

Most monsters will injure or kill the player character on contact, but evidence of their presence can be found in the form of tracks or audible cues. Spiders and bats inflict no injury, but spiders can steal arrows from the player on contact and the flapping of bats' wings will obscure any sounds made by other nearby monsters. The player begins the game with three lives, and if a life is lost, the character respawns in the same maze.

The final maze, Cloudy Mountain, has no exit. Upon entering it, the player must find both halves of the Crown of Kings, each guarded by a powerful winged dragon. The game ends once the player either loses all three lives or reassembles the crown.

== Reception ==
Reception

Review scores
Publication	Score
Electronic Fun with Computers & Games	4/4
TeleMatch	1 (highest)

Electronic Games stated that "Advanced Dungeons & Dragons ... proves to have been worth the wait". The game received an award in the category of "1984 Best Adventure Videogame" at the 5th annual Arkie Awards, where the judges noted it was "the first videogame version of the role-playing game that has entertained millions for many years".

German gaming magazine TeleMatch gave the game a very positive review, scoring it a one out of six, which is the highest on their rating system, and also stating: "In Advanced Dungeons & Dragons everything just makes sense. If you find yourself interested in other - and I repeat: inferior - so-called adventure games on other systems, you will find that this game is the Non Plus Ultra". Electronic Fun with Computers & Games gave the game four out of four, stating in their review: "The graphics are terrific. The dragons look a lot like Godzilla ... each creature has its own distinctive behaviour and charm", but expressed their disdain for the lack of a proper ending.

Levi Buchanan, in a classic Dungeons & Dragons video game retrospective for IGN, said Advanced Dungeons & Dragons is a very basic adventure game similar to Adventure, and "uses so little of the license in game that you can almost see that as more of a branding deal than anything". He concluded by saying: "Even though it has so little to do with the actual D&D universe, this is still an entertaining retro game worth checking out".

In a retrospective review of Cloudy Mountain in Black Gate, Ty Johnston said: "All in all, that original Advanced Dungeons & Dragons game for the Intellivision was loads of fun with what then were considered flashy graphics. It still stands up today for limited play, and it would be worth your time to search out, especially if you are a fan of classic gaming consoles in general and the Intellivision specifically". In 1995, Flux magazine ranked the game 31st on their "Top 100 Video Games".

== Legacy ==
In 2018, an updated version, simply called Cloudy Mountain, was announced for release exclusively on the Intellivision Amico video game console. As the console has faced numerous delays since its announcement, this updated version remains unreleased.
