= Conio.h =

C header file

<conio.h> is a C header file used mostly by MS-DOS compilers to provide console input/output. It is not part of the C standard library or ISO C, nor is it defined by POSIX.

This header declares several useful library functions for performing "istream input and output" from a program. Most C compilers that target MS-DOS, Windows 3.x, Phar Lap, DOSX, OS/2, or Win32 have this header and supply the associated library functions in the default C library. Most C compilers that target UNIX and Linux do not have this header and do not supply the library functions. Some embedded systems or cc65 use a conio-compatible library.

The library functions declared by <conio.h> vary somewhat from compiler to compiler. As originally implemented in Lattice C, the various functions mapped directly to few of the first MS-DOS INT 21H functions. The library supplied with Borland's Turbo C did not use the DOS API but instead accessed video RAM directly for output and used BIOS interrupt calls. This library also has additional functions inspired from the successful Turbo Pascal one.

Compilers that target other operating systems, such as Linux or OS/2, provide similar solutions; the unix-related curses library is common. Another example is SyncTERM's ciolib. The version of <conio.h> from DJ Delorie for the GO32 extender is particularly extensive.

== Functions ==
Name	Description
int kbhit();	Determines if a keyboard key was pressed as well
char* cgets(char* s);	Reads a string directly from the console
int cscanf(char* fmt, ...);	Reads formatted values directly from the console
int putch(int c)	Writes a character directly to the console
int cputs(const char* s);	Writes a string directly to the console
int cprintf(const char* fmt, ...);	Formats values and writes them directly to the console
void clrscr();	Clears the screen
int getch();	Get char entry from the console
char getche();	Get char entry from the console with echo
