= Toshiba Pasopia 5 =

Home computer released in 1984

- Also known as: PA7005
- Type: Home computer
- Released: 1983
- Operating system: BASIC
- CPU: Zilog Z80A @ 4 MHz
- Memory: 64 KB RAM; 16 KB VRAM
- Graphics: 160 x 100 with 8 colors (RGB primaries); 640 x 200 monochrome
- Predecessor: Toshiba Pasopia
- Related: Toshiba Pasopia 7

The Toshiba Pasopia 5 is a computer from manufacturer Toshiba, released in 1983 and based around a Z80 microprocessor. Also known as PA7005, it was released only in Japan, intended as a low price version of the original Toshiba Pasopia.

The keyboard has 90 keys, a separate numeric keypad and eight function keys. The machine could be expanded with disk drives, extra RAM and offered a RS-232 interface and a parallel printer port. The machine is compatible with the original Pasopia.

== See also ==
- Toshiba Pasopia IQ
- Toshiba Pasopia
- Toshiba Pasopia 7
- Toshiba Pasopia 16
