= REX 5000 =

Personal Digital Assistant released by Franklin

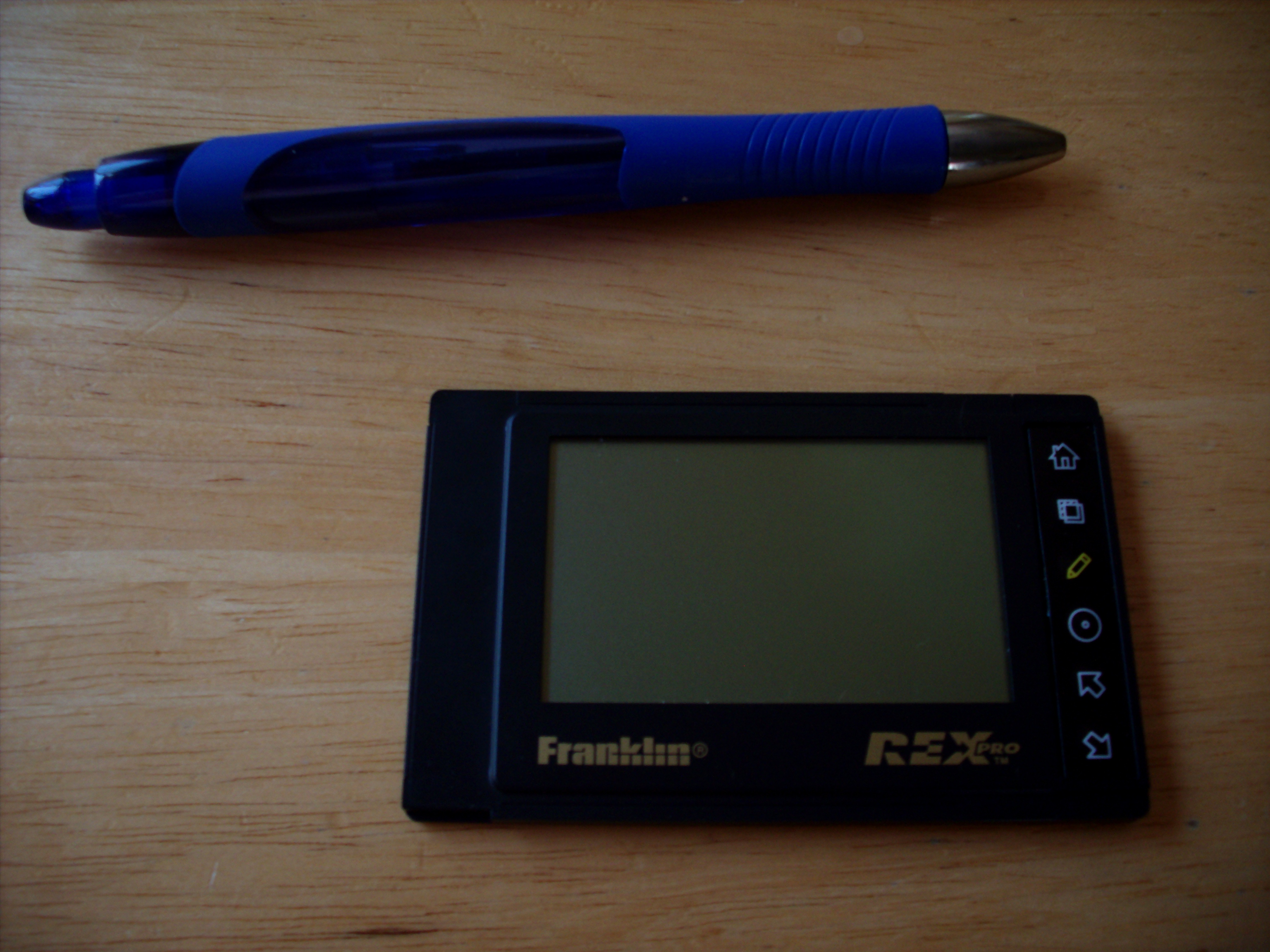
The Franklin REX-PRO5 (pen is for size comparison).

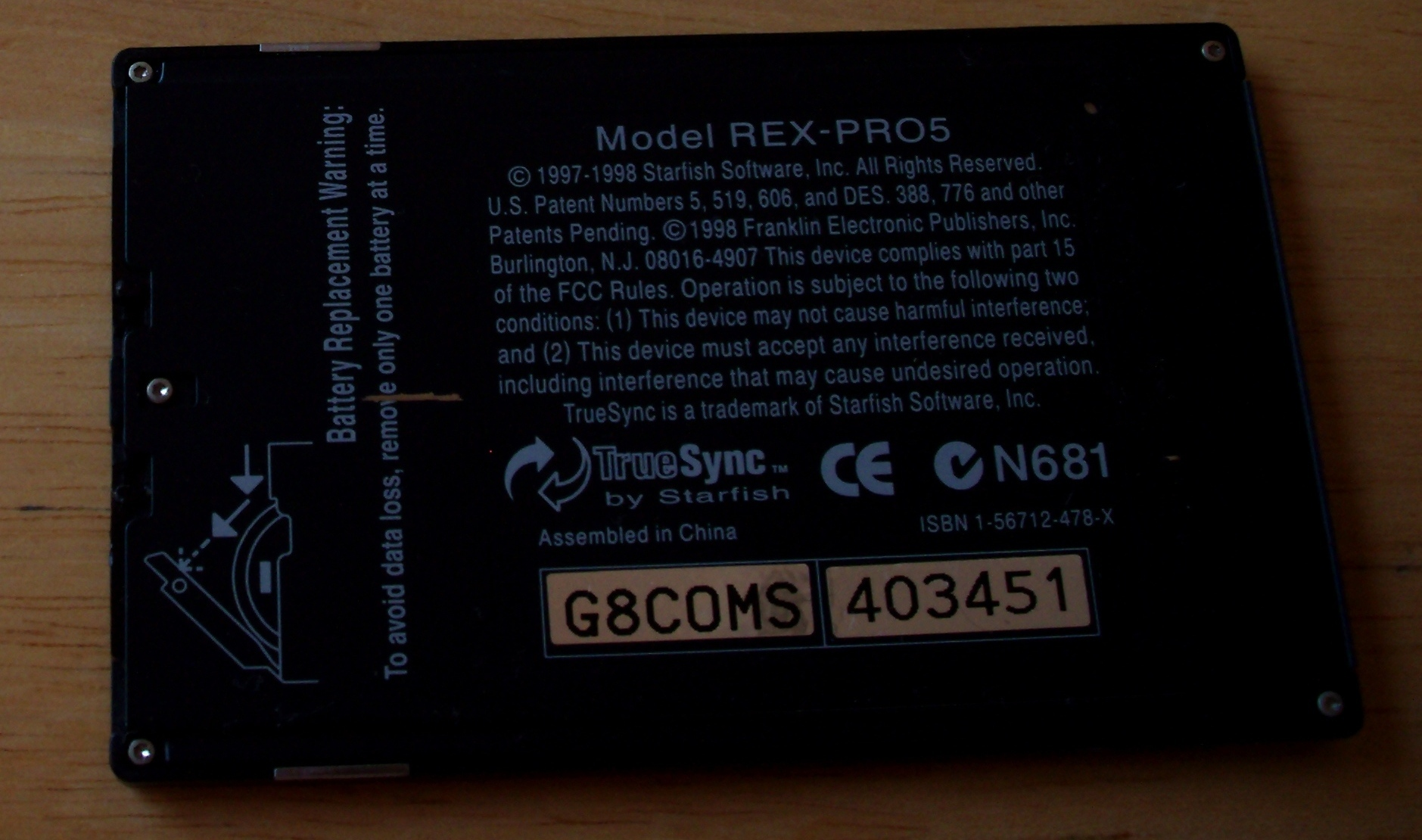
The back of the device.

The Franklin REX 5, (also known as the “Rex-Pro”, as the “Rex 5000”, and with cosmetic variation as the “Rex 5001”) was one of the Rex line of Personal Digital Assistants, each a PCMCIA PC card and thus the size of a credit card, built around a Toshiba microprocessor emulating a Zilog Z80. The REX firmware was written by Starfish Software, and the hardware was manufactured by Citizen Electronics. Earlier models in this line (the Rex and the Rex-3) had almost no input possibilities except to download data when installed in a host computer or in a docking station; the Rex 5 added a sixth button and introduced a modal input method. (The later REX 6000 again had only five buttons, but included a touch screen.) Further, with 512 KB of RAM, the Rex 5 had twice the memory of the Rex-3 (which, in turn, had four times that of the original Rex).

The REX 5000 was repackaged by Motorola as the StarTAC ClipOn Organizer, which piggybacked onto digital versions of their popular StarTAC phone (as well as some Timeport models), expanding the capabilities of the phone from having a capacity of 100 contacts to 1000, and adding calendar and note functionality.

The REX 5000 and StarTAC ClipOn Organizer, like earlier models of the Rex, utilized Starfish Software's TrueSync for data synchronization. Starfish would later be acquired by Motorola.

The REX 5000 was succeeded by the Xircom REX 6000.
