= Toshiba Pasopia IQ =

Series of MSX compatible machines released by Toshiba

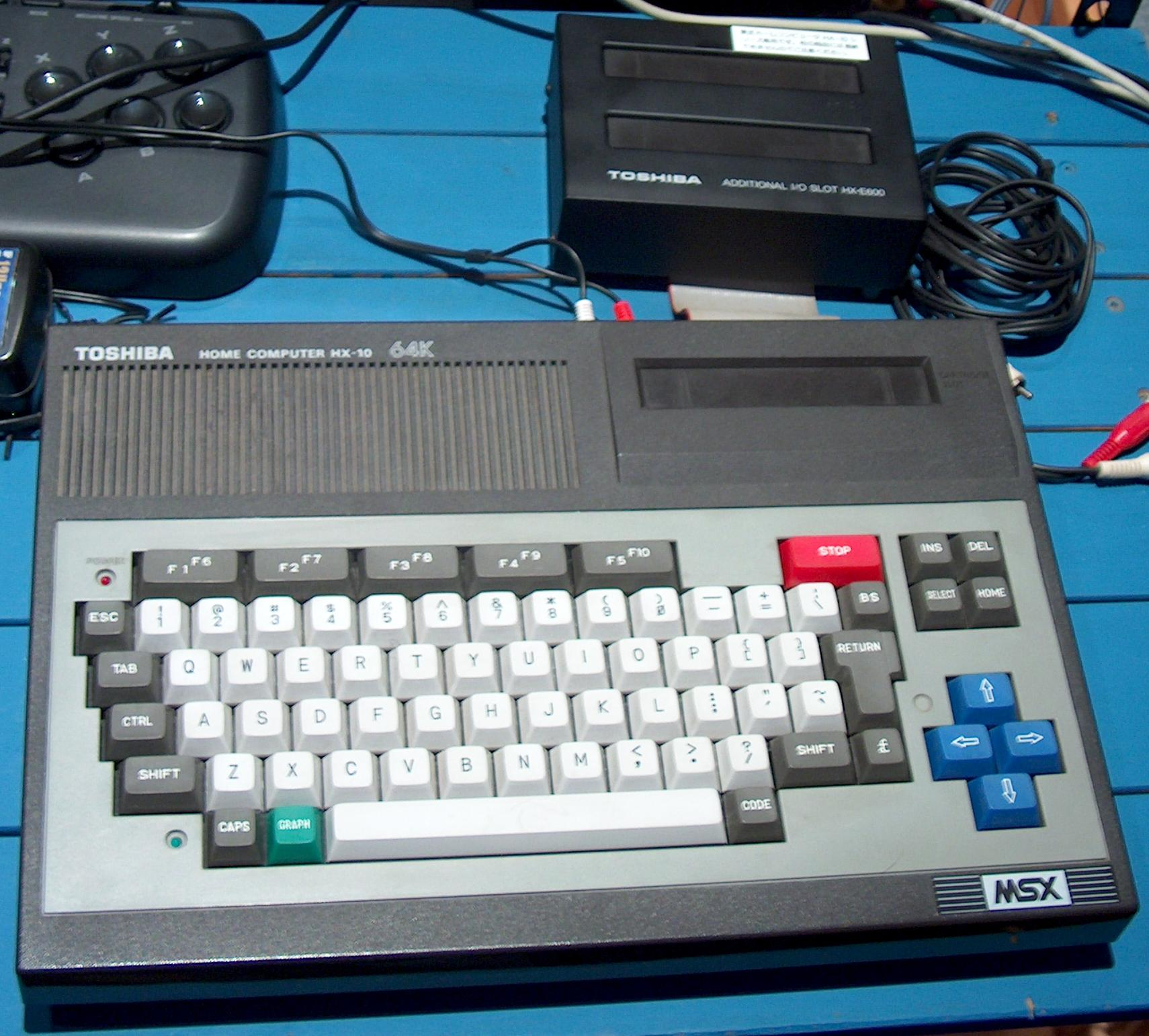
- Toshiba HX-10
- Developer: Toshiba
- Manufacturer: Toshiba
- Type: Home computer
- Released: 1983
- Operating system: MSX BASIC v1.0
- CPU: Zilog Z80 @ 3,58Mhz
- Memory: 64 KB
- Graphics: TMS9918

The Toshiba Pasopia IQ are a series of MSX compatible machines released by Toshiba between 1983 and 1985.

== HX-10 series ==
The HX-10 was released in the fall of 1983. There is only one ROM cartridge slot, but there's an optional expansion slot available. Several models exist (D, DP, DPN, F, E and S), targeting different markets. For example, the HX-10DPN is equipped with an RGB 21-pin terminal, but other connections (RF, composite video) are non existing; the HX-10S only has 16KB of RAM.

== HX-20 series ==
The HX-20 was released in the fall of 1984 is equipped with 64KB of RAM. It has a monaural / stereo sound selector switch. Like with the HX-10 series, several models exist (HX-21, HX-22, HX-23). The later models have a RGB 21-pin video output. The HX-23 is compatible with the MSX2 and comes with 64KB of VRAM. The HX-23F is equipped with a RS-232 interface and comes with 128KB of VRAM.

== HX-30 series ==
The HX-30 was MSX compatible and released in 1985, with 16KB of RAM, with latter models coming with 64KB, a RGB 21-pin video output and Programmable sound generator stereo output. The HX-33 model has 128kB of VRAM and was MSX2 compatible with integrated keyboard. The next model, HX-34, added a floppy disk drive.

== Model list ==
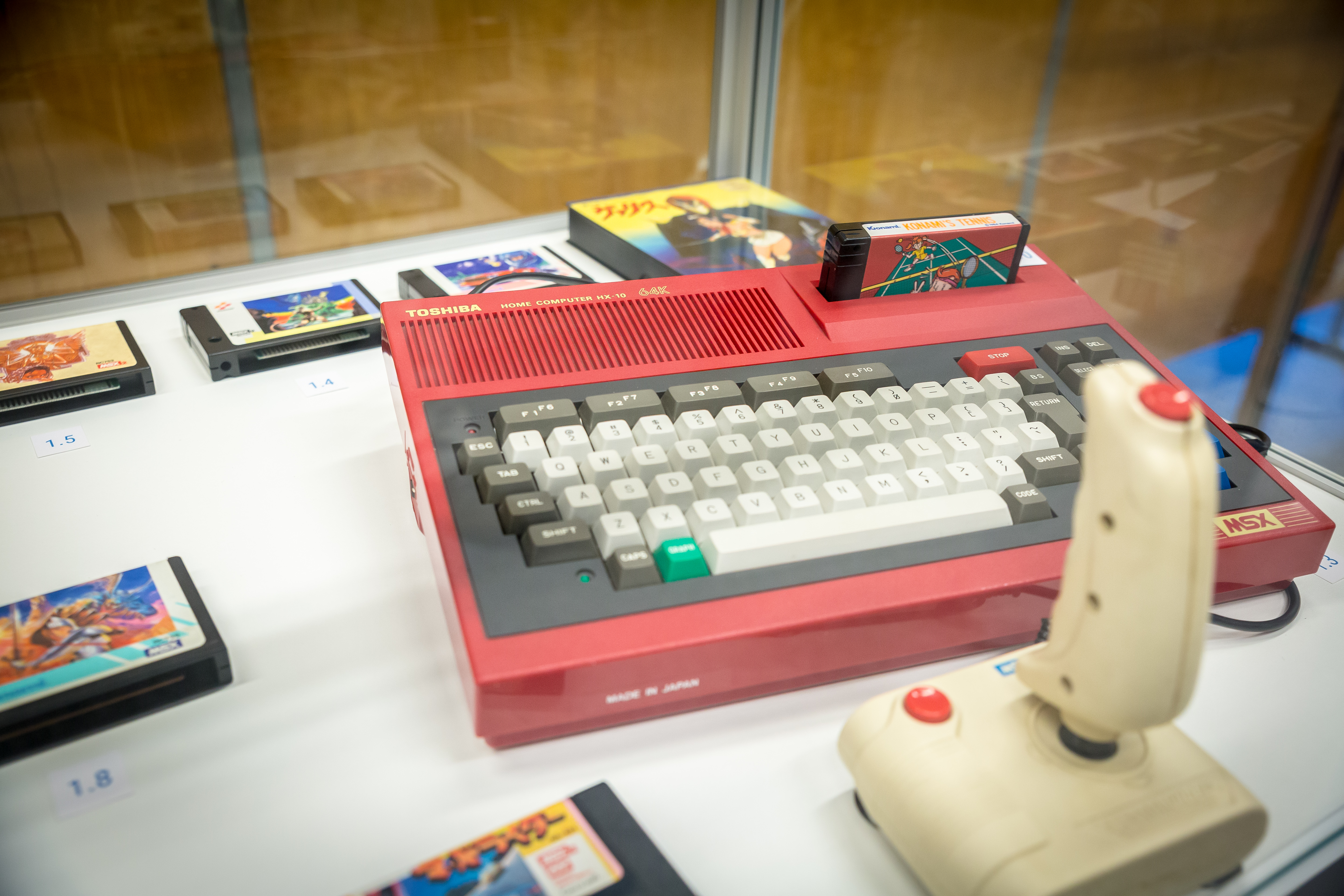
Toshiba HX-10

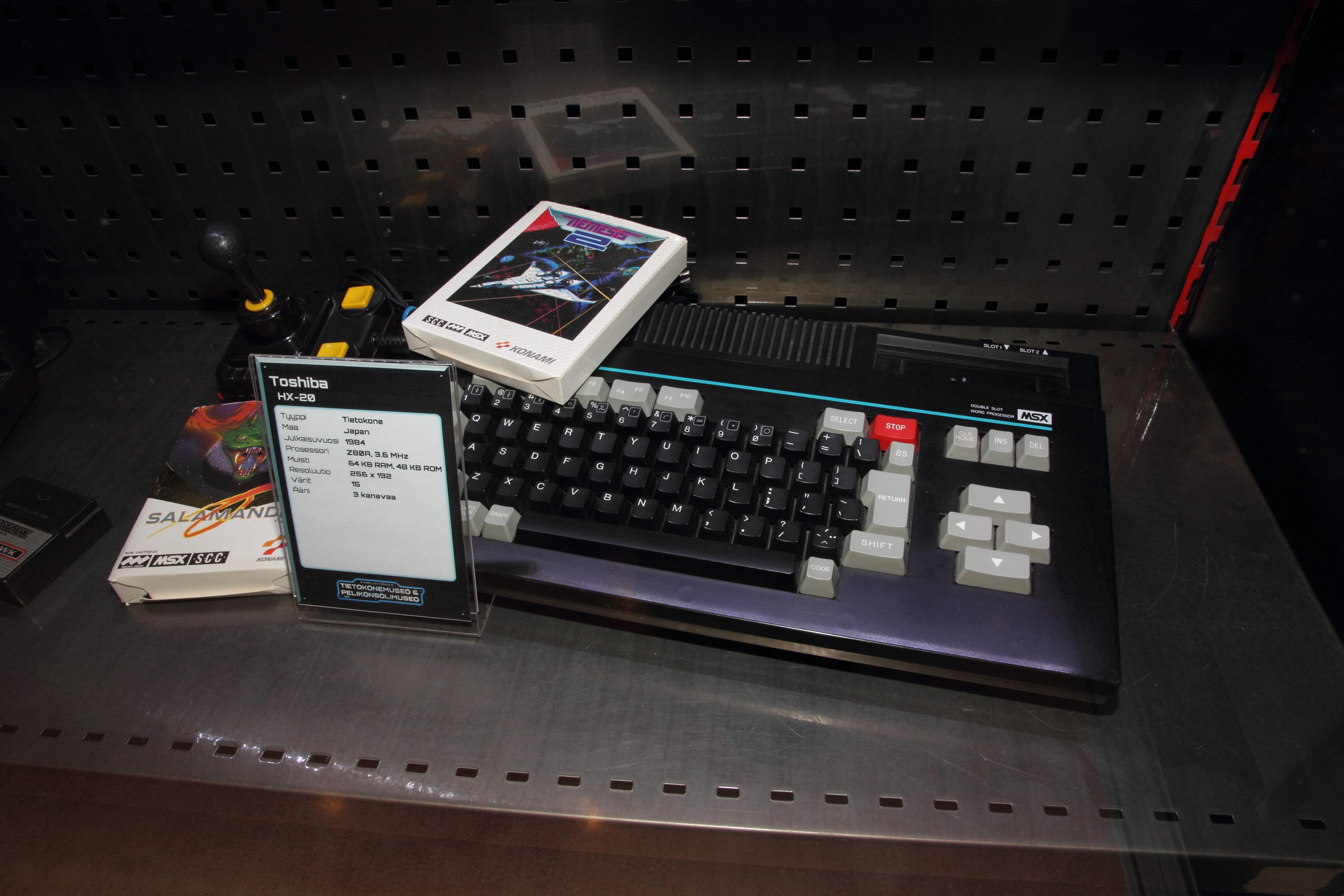
Toshiba HX-20 computer

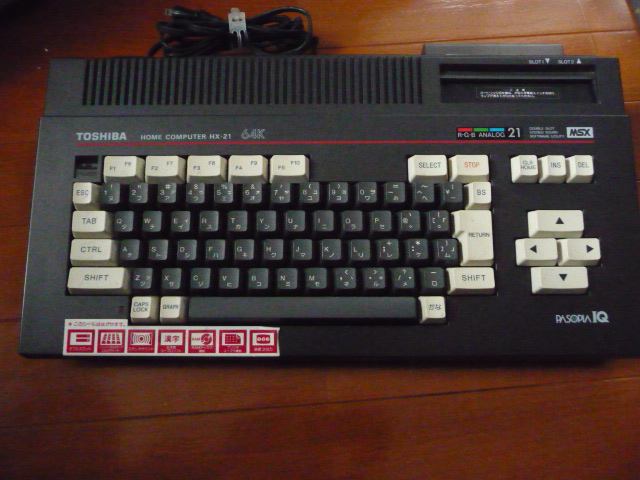
Pasopia IQ HX-21

The following table present a condensed model list of the MSX compatible computers released by Toshiba.

MSX compatible computers released by Toshiba
Model	Year	Region	Compatibility
Toshiba HX-10D (Pasopia IQ)	1983	JP	MSX 1
Toshiba HX-10S (Pasopia IQ)	1983	JP	MSX 1
Toshiba HX-10AA	1984	BE, NL	MSX 1
Toshiba HX-10DP (Pasopia IQ)	1984	JP	MSX 1
Toshiba HX-10DPN (Pasopia IQ)	1984	JP	MSX 1
Toshiba HX-10E	1984	ES	MSX 1
Toshiba HX-10F	1984	FR	MSX 1
Toshiba HX-10I	1984	IT	MSX 1
Toshiba HX-10P	1984	DE, IT, UK	MSX 1
Toshiba HX-10SA (Pasopia IQ)	1984	JP	MSX 1
Toshiba HX-10SF	1984	FI	MSX 1
Toshiba HX-20 (Pasopia IQ)	1984	JP	MSX 1
Toshiba HX-21 (Pasopia IQ)	1984	JP	MSX 1
Toshiba HX-22 (Pasopia IQ)	1984	JP	MSX 1
Toshiba HX-20E	1985	ES	MSX 1
Toshiba HX-20I	1985	IT	MSX 1
Toshiba HX-21F	1985	FR	MSX 1
Toshiba HX-22CH	1985	CH	MSX 1
Toshiba HX-22GB	1985	UK	MSX 1
Toshiba HX-22I	1985	ES, IT	MSX 1
Toshiba HX-30 (Pasopia IQ)	1985	JP	MSX 1
Toshiba HX-31 (Pasopia IQ)	1985	JP	MSX 1
Toshiba HX-32 (Pasopia IQ)	1985	JP	MSX 1
Toshiba HX-51	1985	ES, IT	MSX 1
Toshiba HX-52	1985	ES, IT	MSX 1
Toshiba HX-20AR	1986	AR	MSX 1
Toshiba HX-23 (Pasopia IQ)	1985	JP	MSX 2
Toshiba HX-23F (Pasopia IQ)	1985	JP	MSX 2
Toshiba HX-33 (Pasopia IQ)	1985	JP	MSX 2
Toshiba HX-34 (Pasopia IQ)	1985	JP	MSX 2
Toshiba FS-TM1	1986	IT	MSX 2

== See also ==
- Toshiba Pasopia
- Toshiba Pasopia 5
- Toshiba Pasopia 7
- Toshiba Pasopia 16
