= Tron: Deadly Discs =

1982 video game

- North American Intellivision box art
- Developer: Mattel Electronics
- Publisher: Mattel Electronics
- Designers: Don Daglow; Steven Sents
- Series: Tron
- Platforms: Intellivision, Atari 2600, Mattel Aquarius
- Release: Intellivision: October 1982; 2600: January 1983; Aquarius: 1983
- Genre: Action
- Modes: Single-player, multiplayer

Tron: Deadly Discs is a 1982 action video game developed and published by Mattel Electronics for the Intellivision. It is the first of three Intellivision games based on the Disney film Tron. The player takes the role of Tron, fighting successive waves of enemy Disc-throwers and Recognizers in a never-ending quest to achieve the highest score. The initial game design was done by Don Daglow, with further design and programming by Steven Sents.

Mattel released an Atari 2600 version of the game under its M Network label in 1983, and the game was later ported to the Mattel Aquarius.

== Gameplay ==
Tron: Deadly Discs on Atari 2600

As Tron, the player controls a red man with a yellow Disc. He is pitted in a square arena with black walls. Enemies will appear through doorways and throw their Discs at him. The player has to eliminate all the enemies with his own Disc, as well as surviving bonus rounds against the Recognizer.

The player can throw the Disc in eight directions. When thrown, the Disc first appears as a thin horizontal line and can only move in a straight line. While in this mode, Tron's Disc (and any other Disc thrown in the game) can inflict damage and can also "lock" doors. When it reaches the wall (or when the player calls the Disc back by hitting any directional throw button), it automatically floats back to the player and appears as a square. It is harmless in this mode.

Unlike enemy Disc-throwers, Tron can block enemy discs with his own disc. Blocking shatters the enemy's disc, leaving the enemy temporarily disarmed. If the enemy survives, it receives a replacement disc within ten seconds.

Enemies attack in waves of three. Defeated enemies are replaced every ten seconds unless the player eliminates the entire wave before replacements arrive.

The doorways enemies appear in can be jammed so that they remain open between waves. Doorways appear blue when they first open, but will turn green if Tron either hits them with his Disc or runs into them. Blue doors close at the end of the current wave of enemies, but green ones remain open. If two doors directly across from each other are jammed open, Tron can run into one and immediately reappear at the other, allowing for easier dodging and Disc retrieval. Enemies cannot use the doors in this manner.

If Tron warps through a pair of doors, a Recognizer will appear on the field after the wave is over and begin closing all jammed doors. The player can score bonus points by hitting the Recognizer's eye in a vulnerable spot; doing so forces it off the field and leaves any jammed doors open.

The game ends if Tron touches a Recognizer, takes too many hits from enemy Discs without enough time to recover from them, or is hit by a paralyzing baton that enemies carry in advanced waves.

=== Enemies ===
The player should note that Tron, unlike many of the enemies in the game, can withstand multiple Disc-hits. As the game progresses, Tron's threshold of damage rises. The player can tell how many hits he can take by how fast he moves. The faster he is, the stronger he is. Also, Tron regains strength automatically. Tron can only be damaged by an enemy's weapon, so simply running into an enemy does nothing (unless they're a Guard).

All enemies (except the Recognizer and Guards) can carry dark blue Discs, which are the standard enemy Disc. Leaders may appear with brown Discs (which do twice as much damage) and white Discs (which home in on the player relentlessly). If an enemy's Disc is destroyed, the replacement is always a regular Disc:

- Warriors: Regular Warriors appear as light-blue men. They come in a variety of speeds and are killed in one hit.
- Leaders: Slightly stronger versions of the regular Warriors, Leaders have a dark blue tint and can wield brown and white Discs. They tend to move fast and are killed in one hit.
- Bulldogs: They are as their name suggests: tough, but slow. Appearing as purple men, they require two hits to be killed, and can regain their strength if left alone for too long between hits. They can only carry regular Discs.
- Guards: Arguably the most dangerous of all enemies, Guards appear as orange men. They do not carry Discs; instead, they carry Stun Poles. They can't throw their Stun Poles, but instead will charge Tron. If they reach him, Tron will be stunned and the game is over, regardless of how much strength Tron has. They can withstand multiple hits and are very fast.
- Recognizers: Their main job is to get rid of locked doors, which means that the Recognizer will not appear if no doors are locked. The precursor to its arrival is a loud rumbling noise, followed by it slowly drifting into the screen from any of the four walls. Its job is to close all locked doors, firing a black block at each door to do this. If the player touches the recognizer, he is instantly killed, and the recognizer is nearly invincible. It also launches a paralysis cage at Tron. If it hits him, he is paralyzed for the duration of the Recognizer's mission. Once the Recognizer has unlocked every door, it disappears through the bottom of the screen.

The Recognizer has only one weakness – its eye – which is located on top of its body. Its eye is protected by a green dome with two slits in the sides. If the player can avoid the paralysis probe, he can throw his disc at the eye. The eye cycles between purple (invincible) and white (vulnerable), turning white when the recognizer emits a black box to seal a door. If the player can throw his Disc at the eye and hit it while it is white, the Recognizer breaks and hobbles off the screen making a buzzing noise. Any locked doors that it did not close stay around, giving the player an extra incentive to hit it.

== Remake ==
A remake of the game has been announced for release on the Intellivision Amico.
