= Amsterdam Compiler Kit =

Retargetable charger suite

- Original authors: Andrew Tanenbaum, Ceriel Jacobs
- Developer: David Given
- Initial release: early 1980s
- Stable release: 6.2+ / April 17, 2025; 7 months ago
- Repository: github.com/davidgiven/ack
- Written in: C
- Operating system: Minix, Unix-like
- Type: Retargetable compiler
- License: BSD licenses
- Website: tack.sf.net

The Amsterdam Compiler Kit (ACK) is a retargetable compiler suite and toolchain written by Andrew Tanenbaum and Ceriel Jacobs, since 2005 maintained by David Given. It has frontends for the following programming languages: C, Pascal, Modula-2, BASIC, and Occam.

== History ==
The ACK's notability stems from the fact that in the early 1980s it was one of the first portable compilation systems designed to support multiple source languages and target platforms.

The ACK was known as MINIX's native compiler toolchain until the MINIX userland was largely replaced by that of NetBSD (MINIX 3.2.0) and Clang was adopted as the system compiler.

It was originally closed-source software, initially distributed by Tanenbaum himself, later through UniPress Software and Transmediair Utrecht as distributors in the Americas and Europe respectively. The distribution of compiler binaries for MINIX was a special case in this arrangement. In April 2003, it was released under the BSD licenses.

== Working principle ==
Maximum portability is achieved by using an intermediate language using bytecode, called EM-1 or EM. Each language front-end produces EM object files, which are then processed through several generic optimisers before being translated by a back-end into native machine code.

ACK comes with a generic linker and librarian capable of manipulating files in the ACK's own a.out-based format; it will work on files containing EM code as well as native machine code. However, EM code cannot be linked to native machine code without translating the EM binary first.

== Target processors ==
ACK backends can produce native machine code for a wide range of CPUs, even starting with small 8 bit CPUs.

- 6502
- 65C124 - used for the first software controlled implantable defibrillator, the target was unique in that the C/EM code word size was 1 byte for an int and 2 bytes for a long.
- 6800 (assembler only)
- 6805 (assembler only)
- 6809 (assembler only)
- ARM
- 8080^{*}
- Z80
- Z8000
- Intel 8086^{*}
- i386
- 68000
- 68020
- 68040
- NS32016
- S2650 (assembler only)
- SPARC
- VAX4
- PDP-11
- Broadcom VideoCore IV (BCM2708)*

^{*} Version 6.0

== See also ==
- Portable C compiler
