= Toshiba Pasopia 7 =

1983 8-bit computer from Toshiba

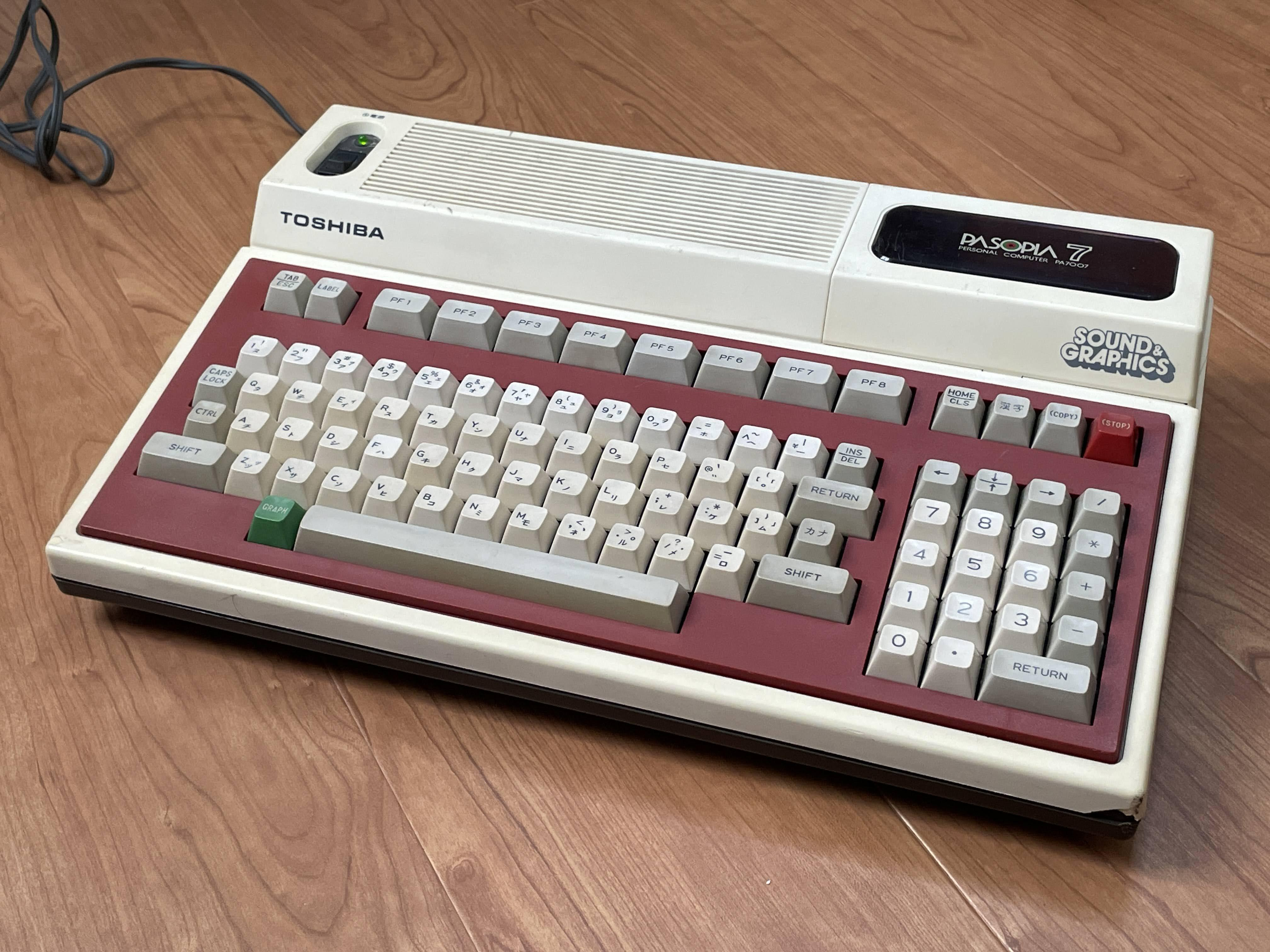
- Toshiba Pasopia 7
- Also known as: PA7007
- Type: Home computer
- Released: 1983
- Introductory price: $1350
- Operating system: T-BASIC7, CP/M optional
- CPU: Zilog Z80A
- Memory: 64 KB RAM; 48 KB VRAM
- Graphics: 320 x 200 / 640 x 200
- Sound: 2x Texas Instruments SN76489, 6 square wave voices + 2 noise generators
- Predecessor: Toshiba Pasopia
- Related: Pasopia 700, Toshiba Pasopia 5

Toshiba Pasopia 7 (also known as PA7007) is a computer from manufacturer Toshiba, released in 1983 and only available in Japan, with a price of $1350.

It was intended as the successor of the Toshiba Pasopia, offering improved sound and graphics. The machine is partially compatible with the original Pasopia, and supports connecting cartridge-type peripherals.

Graphic memory is increased to 48 KB and two SN76489 sound chips are available, producing six square wave channels and two noise channels.

A new version of the operating system, T-BASIC7, is also available. This version is based on Microsoft BASIC and adds specific commands for this model, such as higher numerical precision or support for extra colors.

Available peripherals for the Pasopia 7 are a 5" disk drive, a Chinese characters ROM, a RS-232 interface and a printer. The keyboard is full-stroke JIS standard, with a separate numeric keypad and some function keys.

After 1988, some Pasopia 7 computers were donated to other countries (ex: Poland) under the "International Development of Computer Education Program".

== Related models ==
Released in 1985, the Pasopia 700 is based on the Pasopia 7, and was intended as a home learning system developed by Toshiba and Obunsha. Two disk-drives were added to the side of the main unit and the keyboard is separate. This machine has two cartridge slots (one at the front).

== Color palette ==
The Pasopia 7 uses hardware dithering to simulate intermediate color intensities, based on a mix of two of eight base RGB colors displayed using the 640 x 200 resolution. This allows the machine to display a maximum of 27 colors (3-level RGB).

Pasopia 7 hardware palette - 27 colors, 3-level RGB
**0x00**	0x01	**0x02**	0x03	0x04	0x05	**0x06**	0x07	**0x08**
0x09	0x0A	0x0B	0x0C	0x0D	0x0E	0x0F	0x10	0x11
**0x12**	0x13	**0x14**	0x15	0x16	0x17	**0x18**	0x19	**0x1A**

The 8 base colors are displayed in bold.

Actual color limits depend on the graphic mode used:

- Text mode: characters in 8 base colors, graphics in 4 colors (from 27);
- Fine graphics mode: Kanji characters in 8 base colors, graphics in 8 colors (from 27);
- Palette function: 8 or 4 colors (from 27) depending on the overlap of Kanji and graphics;
- Hardware tiling function: 27 colors can be displayed by combining 2 pixels, with 8 base colors available per pixel.

== See also ==
- Toshiba Pasopia
- Toshiba Pasopia 5
- Toshiba Pasopia IQ
- Toshiba Pasopia 16
