= Mattel Aquarius =

1983 home computer

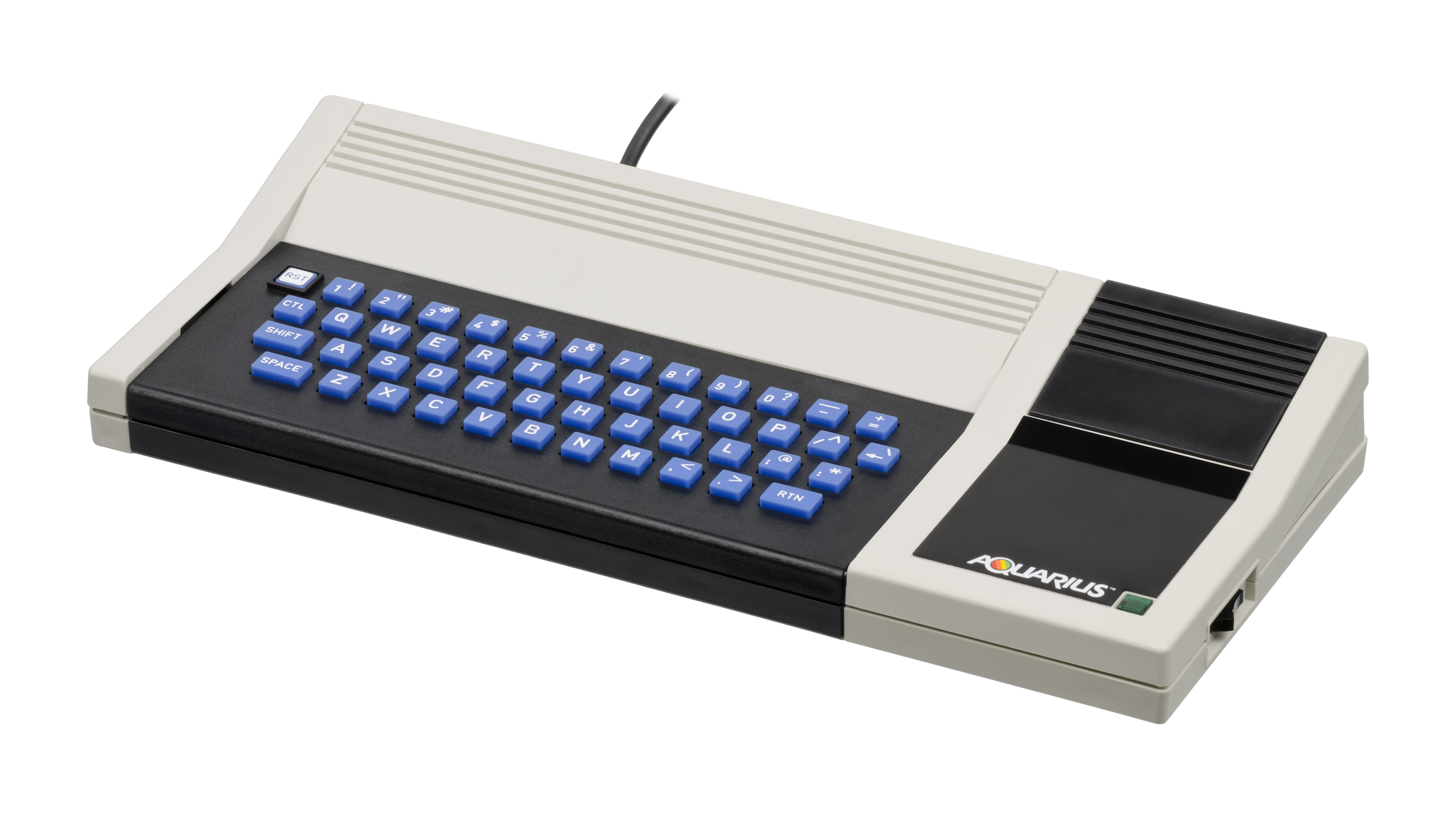
- Manufacturer: Mattel Electronics
- Type: Home computer
- Released: June 1983
- Introductory price: US $160 (today $520)
- Discontinued: October 1983
- Media: Cassette tape, ROM Cartridge
- Operating system: Microsoft BASIC
- CPU: Zilog Z80A @ 3.5 MHz
- Memory: 4KB RAM (expandable to 36KB), 8KB ROM
- Display: 80x72 semigraphics in 16 colors (40x24 character text, 8x8 pixel font)
- Graphics: TEA1002 colour encoder
- Sound: One voice
- Input: Keyboard
- Predecessor: Intellivision
- Successor: Aquarius II, Aquarius+

The Aquarius is a home computer designed by Radofin and released by Mattel Electronics in 1983. Based on the Zilog Z80 microprocessor, the system has a rubber chiclet keyboard, 4 kB of RAM, and a subset of Microsoft BASIC in ROM. It connects to a television set for audiovisual output, and uses a cassette tape recorder for secondary data storage. A limited number of peripherals, such as a 40-column thermal printer, a 4-color printer/plotter, and a 300 baud modem, were released. The Aquarius was discontinued in October 1983, only a few months after it was launched.

== Development ==
Looking to compete in the home computer market, Mattel Electronics turned to Radofin, the Hong Kong based manufacturer of their Intellivision consoles. Radofin had designed two computer systems. Internally they were known as "Checkers" and the more sophisticated "Chess". Mattel contracted for these to become the Aquarius and Aquarius II, respectively.

Aquarius was announced in 1982 and finally released in June 1983, at a price of $160. Production ceased four months later because of poor sales. Mattel paid Radofin to take back the marketing rights. Four other companies (CEZAR Industries, CRIMAC, New Era Incentives, and Bentley Industries) also marketed the unit and accessories.

The Aquarius was often bundled with the Mini-Expander peripheral, which added game pads, an additional cartridge port for memory expansion, and the General Instrument AY-3-8910 sound chip. Other peripherals were the data recorder, 40 column thermal printer, 4 and 16 kB RAM cartridges. Less common first party peripherals include a 300 baud cartridge modem, 32 kB RAM cart, four color plotter, and Quick Disk drive.

== Reception ==
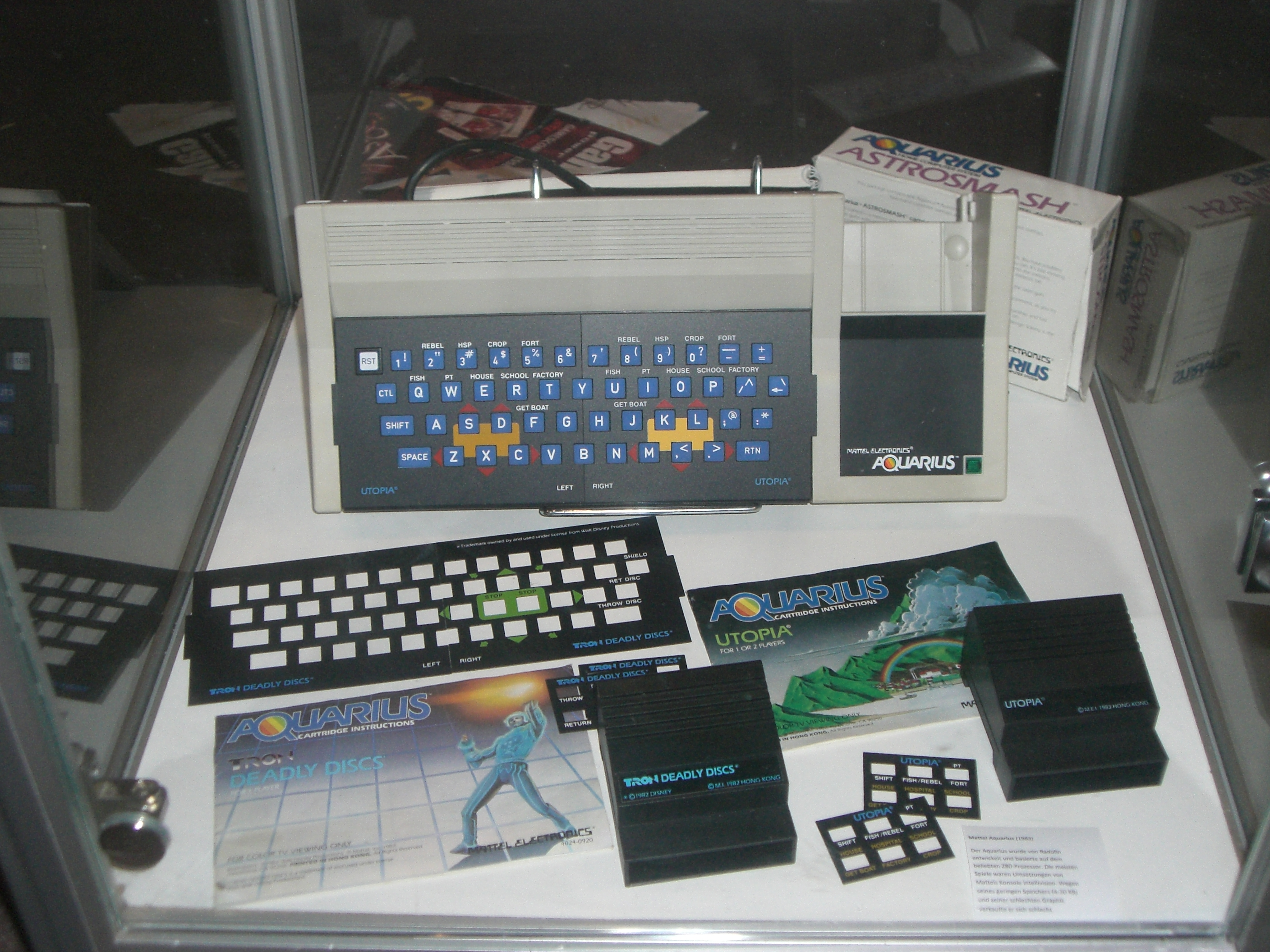
Aquarius game cartridges and keyboard overlays

Although less expensive than the TI-99/4A and VIC-20 home computers it competed against, the Aquarius was made a less attractive purchase by its comparatively weak graphics and limited memory as well as the hidden cost of add-ons required to overcome the limitations of the base unit.

Internally, Mattel programmers adopted Bob Del Principe's mock slogan, "Aquarius – a system for the seventies"; this was a slight, as the Aquarius was developed and released in the 1980s. Of the 32 software titles Mattel announced for the unit, only 21 were actually released, and most of those were ports of Intellivision games, often inferior ports. Because of the hardware limitations of the Aquarius, the quality of many games suffered. The absence of any all-points-addressable graphics mode was so glaring that Radofin crafted the character set for the Aquarius with many tiles and sub-tiles, as well as block graphics characters, so games could at least feign sprites and use semigraphics. It proved to be not enough. As COMPUTE! magazine put it:

"The Aquarius suffered one of the shortest lifespans of any computer—it was discontinued by Mattel almost as soon as it hit store shelves, a victim of the 1983 home computer price wars."

Decades after the original product life of the Aquarius, retrocomputing enthusiasts returned to this platform with renewed interest, partly due to rarity and hacker interest in working within tight system constraints. Multiple homebrew games have been published since, and development in Aquarius software continues, using surviving original hardware, FPGA implementations, and emulators.

== Technical specifications ==
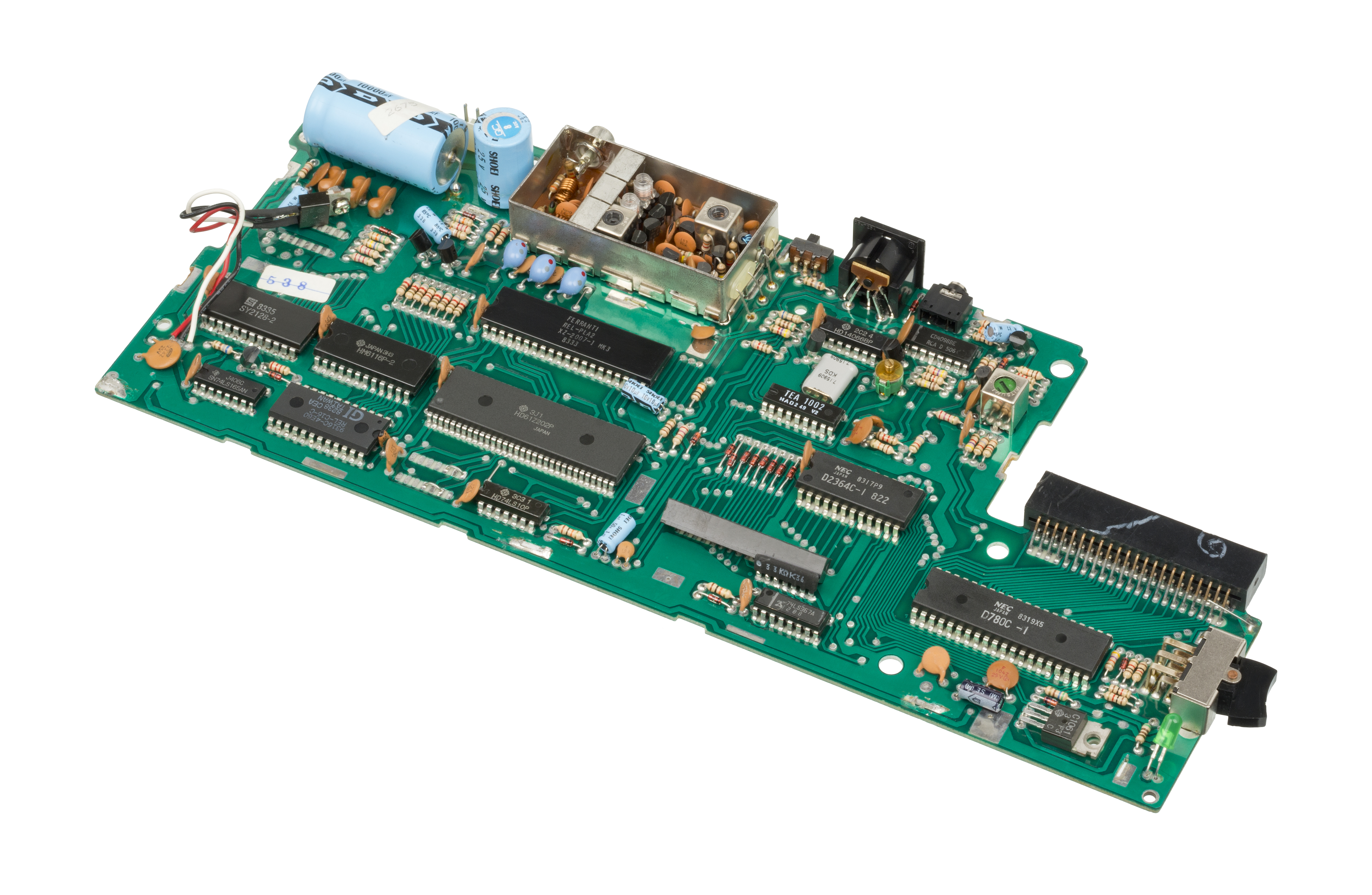
Aquarius motherboard

- CPU: Zilog Z80 @ 3.5 MHz
- Memory: 4 kB RAM, expandable to 36 kB; 8 kB ROM
- Keyboard: 48-key rubber chiclet keyboard
- Display: 80 × 72 semigraphics (40 × 24 text characters - with a 25th "zero" row at top - with a size of 8 × 8 pixels, equivalent to 320 × 192 pixels) in 16 colors (TEA1002 colour encoder)
- Sound: one voice, expandable to four voices
- Ports: television, cartridge/expansion, tape recorder, printer
- PSU: non-removable external power supply hard-wired into case providing 8.8 / 16 / -19 VDC

== Peripherals ==
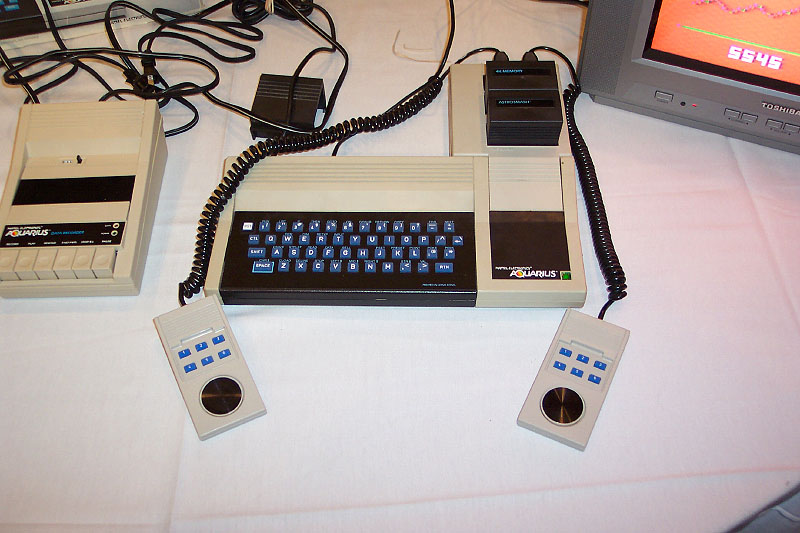
The Aquarius with attached expansion block including 4 kB RAM expansion and game cartridge inserted, controllers, and tape data recorder

Despite its relatively short time on the market, Mattel Electronics and Radofin managed to have most of the announced peripherals available within a month or so of the release of the system. Some products never materialized beyond prototype phase, and some were available only in specific markets. Beginning in 2016, new user-designed peripherals began to show up, mostly on eBay or on vintage computer forums such as AtariAge.

Name	Product Type	Year	Creator	Notes
Mini Expander	System expander	1983	Mattel/Radofin	Included two Hand Controllers, with slots for RAM and ROM cartridges. Difficult to find outside of North America
Data recorder	Serial storage device	1983	Mattel/Radofin	Included data cable, manual, and sample software cassette
Thermal printer	Serial printer	1983	Mattel/Radofin	Included printer cable, manual, and roll of thermal paper
Color printer	Serial plotter	1984	Mattel/Radofin	Included printer cable, roll of paper, manual, and spare pens. Unit was a rebrand of a similar Tandy/RS printer
Modem	Cartridge-based 300 baud modem	1984	Mattel/Radofin	Included phone cables, manual, and software on cassette
4kB RAM	RAM cartridge	1983	Mattel/Radofin	Expanded available RAM to about 6k
16kb RAM	RAM cartridge	1983	Mattel/Radofin	Expanded available RAM to about 18k
32kb RAM	RAM cartridge	1983	Mattel/Radofin	Expanded available RAM to about 34kB
Quick Disk	Disk-based storage	1984?	Mattel/Radofin?	Released only as a prototype unit
32kB RAM	RAM cartridge	2015	Jay Snellen, III	Expanded available RAM to about 34kB
Micro Expander	System expander	2016	Bruce Abbot	Included 32kB RAM, custom ROM with USB BASIC, USB interface, AY-3-8910 PSG, and a 3.5mm audio jack
Aquarius MX	System expander	2022	Harrington, Mack, Kaylor, et al.	Included 32kB RAM, custom ROM with MX BASIC 2.0, USB interface, AY-3-8910 PSG, and DB9 hand controller ports

== Interfacing ==
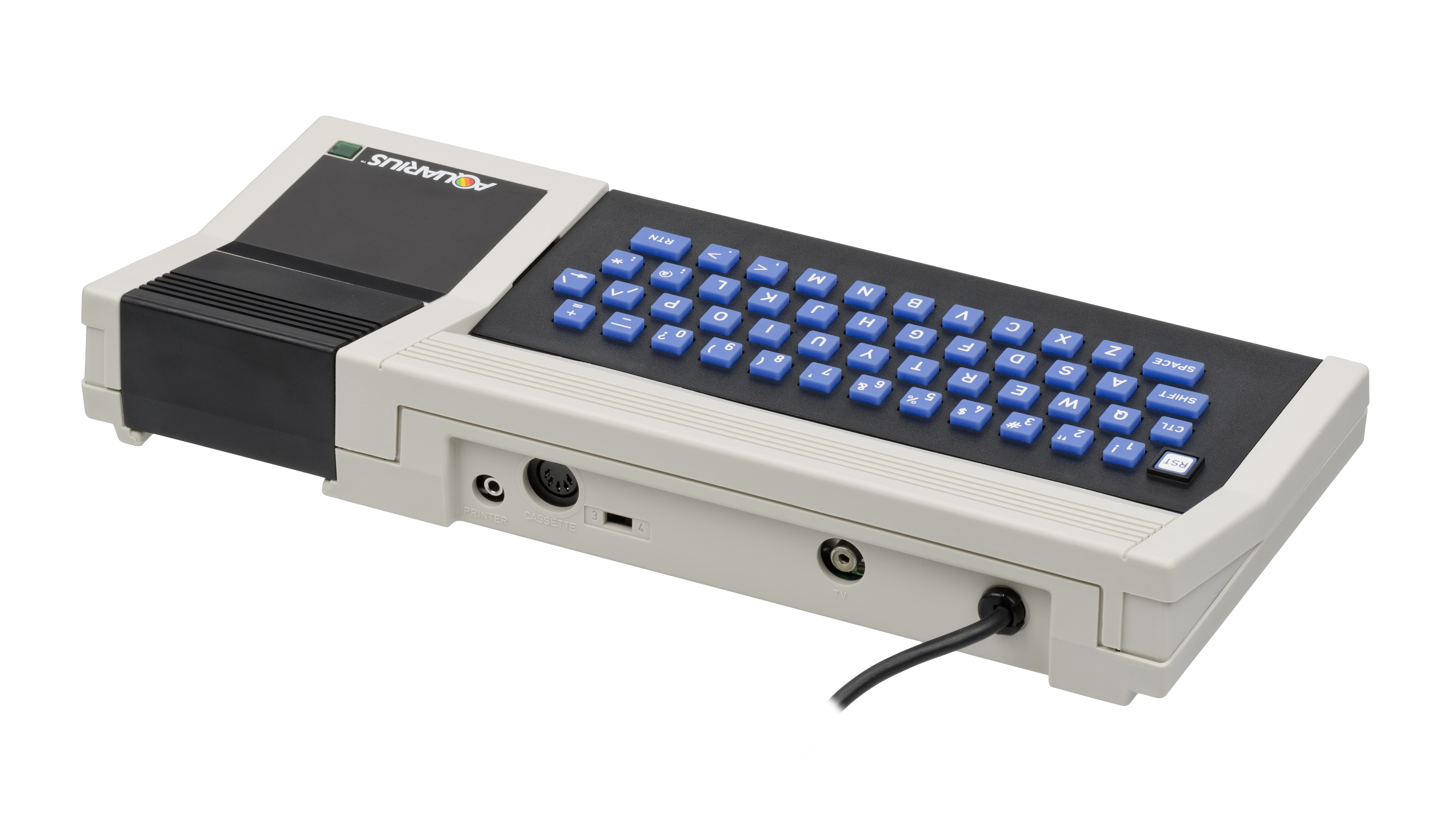
The back of the Aquarius, showing the unidirectional serial printer port in the form of a TRS minijack, the DIN-type external cassette drive connector, the TV channel 3/4 selector switch, the TV output connector, and the hardwired power lead

The Aquarius manual did not contain detailed documentation on any of the ports available, but Aquarius FAQ files and later retrocomputing websites shared the ascertained information.

=== Cassette port ===
The cassette port, although using the same 5-pin DIN 41524 connector as the TRS-80, did not have the same pinout and thus was incompatible with readily available cables for the TRS-80, even though they physically fit the sockets on both the computer and cassette player. The Aquarius-branded cassette deck came with the appropriate cable.

The cassette port is a 5-pin female DIN 41524 connector

DIN41524 5 Pin Female connector

Pin	Function Aquarius	Function TRS-80
1	MIC	REMote
2	Common ground	Common ground
3	EAR	REMote
4	Not used	EAR
5	Not used	MIC

The MIC and EAR connections from the Aquarius each go to the tip/center of one of the two mini-plugs being attached to the recorder; Ground goes to the base/outside of both mini-plugs.

=== Printer port ===
The printer interface is a 3.5 mm mini-stereo socket with 3 lines (tip, ring, sleeve), the same as on the Mattel Entertainment Computer System. The Aquarius printers came with their own cables. The interface conforms to RS-232 serial signal standards (+12VDC/-12VDC), and with knowledge of its pinout it is possible to interface with RS232-compatible serial printers.

Typical serial printers had DB-25 interfaces; some had DE-9 interfaces; and some Radio Shack (RS) printers had round 4-pin female DIN serial interfaces (with the pin sockets numbered left-to-right: 4, 3, 2, 1).

The following shows the pinout for the printer connector on the Aquarius, as well as for connection with the aforementioned serial printers:

Aquarius printer port	⎯⎯⎯⎯ compatible cable ⎯⎯⎯▶	Serial printer's connector		
3.5mm TRS	Function	DB-25	DB-9	RS DIN
Tip	Data output [to printer] (TxD)	Pin 3	Pin 2	Pin 4
Ring	Printer busy/data set ready (DSR)	Pin 20	Pin 4	Pin 2
Sleeve	Signal ground (GND)	Pin 7	Pin 5	Pin 3

The serial transfer protocol is fixed to 1200 baud 8N2, and provided both carriage return and line feed commands to the printer; thus the printer needed to be set to not also execute a line feed on carriage return. Because the Aquarius printer port used only a minimum number of pins (TxD/DSR/GND), the use of this port was unidirectional, from the computer to the printer (or other attached serial device).

== Character set ==
In September 2024, all remaining—hitherto missing—Aquarius characters were added to Unicode 16.0, in the Symbols for Legacy Computing Supplement Unicode block. The following table shows the Mattel Aquarius character set. Each character is shown with its Unicode equivalent.

Mattel Aquarius
	0	1	2	3	4	5	6	7	8	9	A	B	C	D	E	F
0x	£	½	¼	¾	÷	©	→	←	↑	↓	↗	↙	↘	↖	𜷰	𜷱
1x	𜷲	𜷳	𜷴	𜷦	𜷧	𜷨	𜷩	𜷪	𜷫	𜷵	▗	▝	▖	▘	▚	▄
2x	SP	!	"	#	$	%	&	'	(	)	*	+	,	-	.	/
3x	0	1	2	3	4	5	6	7	8	9	:	;	<	=	>	?
4x	@	A	B	C	D	E	F	G	H	I	J	K	L	M	N	O
5x	P	Q	R	S	T	U	V	W	X	Y	Z	[	\	]		_
6x	`	a	b	c	d	e	f	g	h	i	j	k	l	m	n	o
7x	p	q	r	s	t	u	v	w	x	y	z	{	|	}	~	█
8x	▇	▏	𜷬	𜷭	🮏	🮌	▒	●	▂	▆	🛧 (Note: It appears this was also intended to be used as a Spade card symbol)	𜷸	𜷮	𜷯	▶	▲
9x	▁	▉	𜷶	𜷷	🮎	🮍	⬤	▎	▍	▌	✈	𜷹	𜷼	𜷻	◀	▼
Ax	NBSP	🬀	🬁	🬂	🬃	🬄	🬅	🬆	🬇	🬈	🬉	🬊	🬋	🬌	🬍	🬎
Bx	🬏	🬐	🬑	🬒	🬓	▌	🬔	🬕	🬖	🬗	🬘	🬙	🬚	🬛	🬜	🬝
Cx	◢	◣	🯨	▊	▪	♦	·	🯬	┼	🯭	╱	🯩	┴	├	┐	└
Dx	𜷿	𜷾	🯪	𜷽	♥	♣	│	🯮	╳	🯯	╲	🯫	┬	┤	┌	┘
Ex	🬞	🬟	🬠	🬡	🬢	🬣	🬤	🬥	🬦	🬧	▐	🬨	🬩	🬪	🬫	🬬
Fx	🬭	🬮	🬯	🬰	🬱	🬲	🬳	🬴	🬵	🬶	🬷	🬸	🬹	🬺	🬻	█

== Software ==
There were 67 pieces of commercial software published for the Aquarius during its commercial life (1983–84):

Title	Publisher (developer)	Product code	Release date	Note
3D Battle Zone	Add On Electronics (Kevin Baker)	KEB012	1984	Clone of Battlezone. UK Release. Requires 16K Memory.
Advanced Dungeons & Dragons: Treasure of Tarmin †	Mattel Electronics		1983	
Aliens	Add On Electronics (Warren Wander)	KEB002	1983	UK Release. Requires 16K Memory.
Aquapack 1 (Snake, Breakout, Moon Shuttle)	Apocalypse Software		????	
Astrosmash †	Mattel Electronics, Radofin Electronics		1983	Port of an Intellivision game.
Biorhythms †	Mattel Electronics		1983	
Bounder	Add On Electronics (Kevin Baker)	KEB011	1984	UK Release. Requires 16K Memory.
Breakout	Add On Electronics (Kevin Baker)	KEB010	1983	Clone of Breakout. UK Release. Requires 16K Memory.
Burger Time †	Mattel Electronics, Radofin Electronics		1983	
Chess (Dick Smith Electronics)	Dick Smith Electronics		1983	
Chess (Mattel)†	Mattel Electronics		1983	
Chuckman	Add On Electronics (Kevin Baker)	KEB004	1983	UK Release. Requires 16K Memory.
D-Fenders	Add On Electronics (Kevin Baker)	KEB008	1983	Clone of Defender. UK Release. Requires 16K Memory.
Deathrace	Apocalypse Software		????	
Demo Cassette (Stalactites, Macho-Man, Torment, Cute Cubes, Alien Quest, Mad Mould)	Radofin Electronics		1983	
Diamond Mine	Add On Electronics (Kevin Baker)		1984	UK Release. Requires 16K Memory.
Disco Fever	Add On Electronics (Kevin Baker)	KEB016	1984	UK Release. Requires 16K Memory.
Ed-On	Add On Electronics	KEB003	1983	Clone of Head-On. UK Release. Requires 16K Memory.
Extended Microsoft Basic (Mattel)†	Mattel Electronics		1983	Extended & expanded version of Microsoft BASIC
FileForm †	Mattel Electronics		1983	Word processing utility.
FinForm †	Mattel Electronics. Radofin Electronics		1983	Spreadsheet utility.
First Adventure	Digital Output		1984	
Games Pack 1 (Stalactites, Macho-Man, Othello, Mutants)	Add On Electronics	KEB009	1983	
Games Pack 2 (Mad Mould, Invisible Outline, Alien Attack, Rick 'O' Shea)	Add On Electronics	KEB013	1983	
Games Pack 3 (Crazy Plane, Torment, Alien Quest, Cute Cubes)	Add On Electronics	KEB014	1983	
Games Pack 2 (Bounder, Local Bomber, Breakout, Lonely Night Driver)	Custom Cables International	CCI005	1984	
Games Pack 3 (Metior, Sheepdog, Mastermind, Depthcharge)	Custom Cables International	CCI006	1984	
Games Pack 4 (Painter, Pontoon, Grand Prix, Alien Storm)	Custom Cables International	CCI007	1984	
GamesTape (Dodge It, Trojan Dragon, Death Trap, Tablets of Hippocrates)	Fawkes Computing		1984	
Gamespack 1 (Snake, Masterguess, Symon, Bomber, Hi-Lo)	Processor Software		1984	
Gamespack 2 (Collector, Blocked!, Rocket Run, Minefield, Air-Defence)	Processor Software		1984	
Gamespack 3 (Gunfight, Gambler, Moonlander, Tracker, Nim)	Processor Software		????	
Gamespack 4 (Super Slot, Golf, Invasion, Killer Sub, Survival)	Processor Software		????	
Ghost Hunter	Dick Smith Electronics		????	
Grid Bug	Add On Electronics (Kevin Baker)	KEB007	1983	UK Release. Requires 16K Memory.
Hopper	Microdeal		1984	
Invaders	Dick Smith Electronics		1984	
Kronos Europea Cassette (Gamble, Gunfight, Mad Mould, Outline)	Radofin Electronics		1984	
Logo †	Mattel Electronics		1983	Educational software utility
Maths Armada	Dick Smith Electronics		1984	
Mazantics	Add On Electronics (Kevin Baker)	KEB018	1984	UK Release. Requires 16K Memory.
Melody Chase †	Mattel Electronics		1983	
Millypede	Add On Electronics	KEB005	1983	Clone of Centipede. UK Release. Requires 16K Memory.
Mower Man	Add On Electronics (Keith Perry)	KEB020	1984	UK Release. Requires 16K Memory.
N-Vaders	Add On Electronics	KEB001	1983	Clone of Space Invaders. UK Release. Requires 16K Memory.
Night Stalker †	Mattel Electronics, Radofin Electronics		1983	Port of an Intellivision game.
Outpack 1 (Snake, Masterguess, Symon, Bomber, Hi-Lo)	Digital Output		1984	
Outpack 2 (Collector, Blocked, Rocket Run, Minefield, Air-Defence)	Digital Output		1984	
Outpack 3 (Gunfight, Gambler, Moonlander, Tracker, Nim)	Digital Output		1984	
Outpack 4 (Super Slot, Golf, Invasion, Killer Sub, Survival)	Digital Output		1984	
Outpack 5 (Timetrap, Gro-Worm, Wampus Gold, Bumpers, Space Shoot)	Digital Output		1984	
Pac Mr	Add On Electronics (Kevin Baker)	KEB006	1983	Clone of Pac-Man. UK Release. Requires 16K Memory.
Pack 1 (Bombardier, Fruit Machine, Hang Man, Alien Descent, Escape)	Mercury House		????	
Pack 2 (Dungeon Adventure, U-Boat, Golf, Star Catcher, Moonraker)	Mercury House		????	
Phrogger	Add On Electronics (Warren Wander)	KEB007	1983/1984	Clone of Frogger. Named Road Toad on start screen. UK Release. Requires 16K Memory.
Postman Pot	Add On Electronics (Kevin Baker)	KEB015	1984	UK Release. Requires 16K Memory.
Rally Driver	Micro Mart Software		1984	
Read It	Dick Smith Electronics		1984	
Scramble	Micro Mart Software		1984	Clone of Scramble. Requires 16K Memory.
Snafu †	Mattel Electronics, Radofin Electronics		1983	Port of an Intellivision game.
Space Ram	Dick Smith Electronics		1984	
Space Speller †	Mattel Electronics		1983	
Tracker	Digital Output		????	
Tron: Deadly Discs †	Mattel Electronics, Radofin Electronics		1983	Port of an Intellivision game.
Utopia †	Mattel Electronics, Radofin Electronics		1983	Port of an Intellivision game.
Zero In †	Mattel Electronics		1983	
Zorgon's Kingdom	Romik Software		1984	

† ROM cartridge

There are 47 pieces of homebrew software developed for the Aquarius:

Homebrew games	Publisher/Developer	Release date	Note
AlphaMix	Oasis		
Altairis	Roy Templeman	June 2026	Requires 16K memory.
Aquaricart	Snellen III, Jay	2011	multicart with original Mattel titles + demo / debug software
AquariNyan	Taylor, Heidi	April 2026	Demo only. Music by AquariBob(tm). For Midwest Gaming Classic 2026. Requires 16K memory.
Aquariworm	Cronosoft / Roy Templeman	2020	
Astro Covoy	Cronosoft / Roy Templeman	2024	Requires 16K Memory.
Bomb Catcher II	Cronosoft / Roy Templeman	2021	
Crossword Computer	Oasis		
Doomsday Defender	Cronosoft / Roy Templeman	2022	Requires 16K Memory.
Electric Organ	Oasis		
Fall of the Eastern Blocks	Leinen, Jason J.	1999	
Flying	Oasis		
Football	D.A. Spencer		
Fruit Machine	D.A. Spencer		
Grid Trap	Cronosoft / Roy Templeman		Requires 32K Memory.
Gunnery	Oasis		
Mastercode	Oasis		
Nonogram!	Heidi Taylor	2025	Requires 32K Memory. Demo for RetroFest 2025.
Pontoon	D.A. Spencer		
Rollerball	D.A. Spencer		
Sketch	Oasis		
Ski	D.A. Spencer		
Solitaire	Oasis		
Space Collision	D.A. Spencer		
Spacepits	D.A. Spencer		
Strikeforce	D.A. Spencer		
Symmetry	Oasis		
Turmoil 2022	8-Bit Milli Games	2022	
Warp Factor	Cronosoft / Roy Templeman	2023	Requires 16K Memory.
Paqu Deluxe	Cronosoft / Roy Templeman	2024	
10 Liner - Invader	Roy Templeman	2019	
10 Liner - Cave Navigator	Roy Templeman	2021	
10 Liner - Ralph Roll	Heidi Taylor	2021	
10 Liner - Attack of the ROM Robots	Roy Templeman	2022	
10 Liner - Star Trekkin	Heidi Taylor	2022	
10 Liner - AstroRun	Roy Templeman	2023	
10 Liner - Paqu	Roy Templeman	2024	
10 Liner - BOMBER!	Roy Templeman	2025	
10 Liner - Aquariorb	Heidi Taylor	2025	
First Place	Roy Templeman	2026	
Aquaroids	Roy Templeman	2026	
Artemis Patrol	Roy Templeman	2026	
Rubber Burnin	Roy Templeman	2026	
Doomsday Defender II	Roy Templeman	2026	
Caq-Man	Roy Templeman	2026	
Swarm Vaders	Roy Templeman	2025	
Cluckie Egg	Roy Templeman	2026	

== Aquarius II ==
Just after the release of the Aquarius, Mattel had announced plans for the Aquarius II. However, before this could happen, Mattel had returned the rights to Radofin and left the market.

In April 1984, a sample of the Aquarius II - now marketed by Radofin themselves - was reviewed by UK magazine Your Computer, who quoted a price of £80 and considered it "a vast improvement over the Aquarius 1".

There is evidence that the Aquarius II reached the market in small numbers under the Radofin brand, and that it was actively promoted in France, with press advertisements from its official distributor appearing there towards the end of 1984.

In spite of this, it was also not a commercial success. Technically otherwise identical to the previous version, the Aquarius II came with a 16 kB RAM extension, mechanical keyboard and Extended BASIC.
