= Digi International =

American technology company

Digi International, Inc.
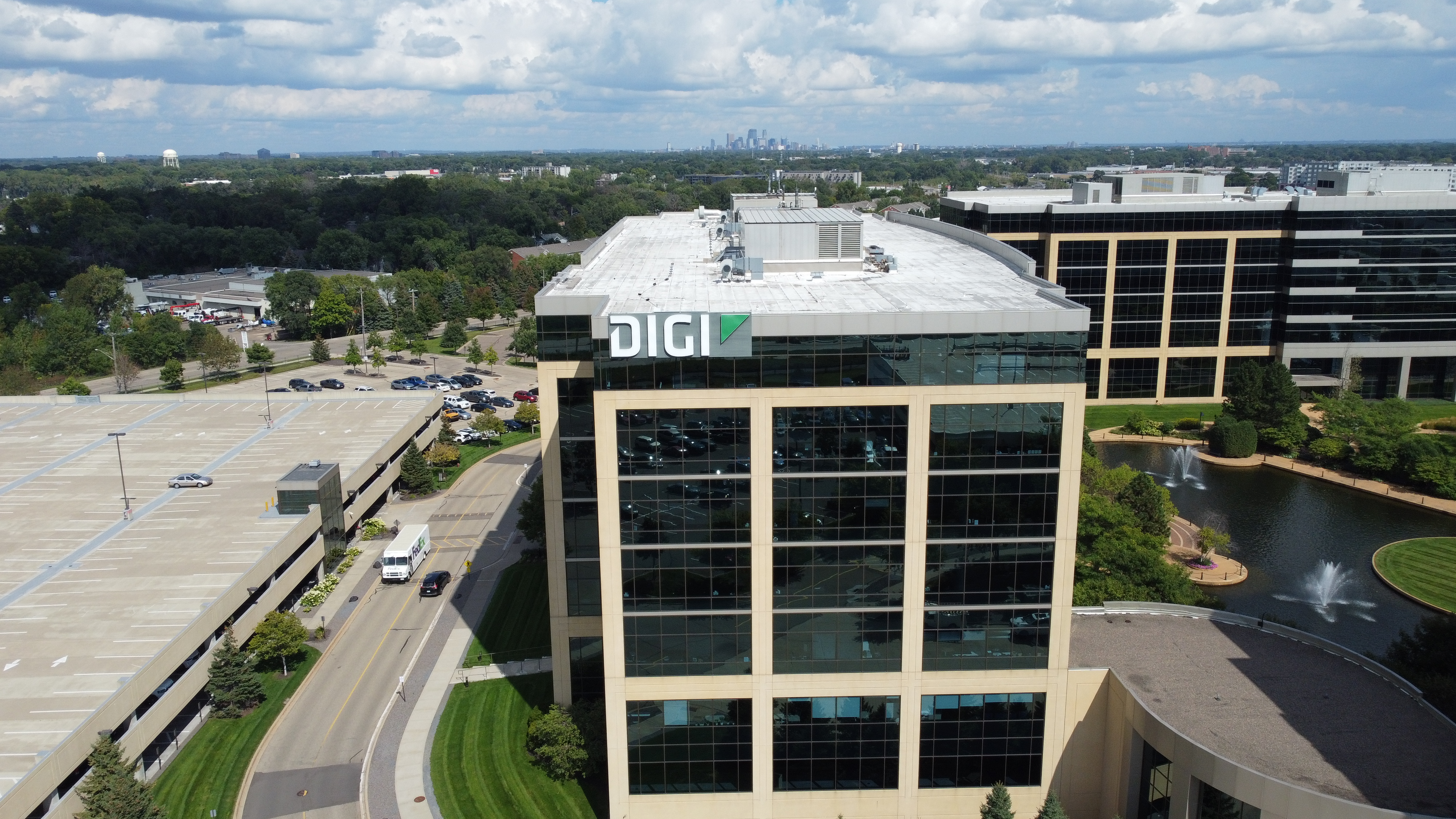
- Digi International headquarters in Hopkins, MN
- Type: Public
- Traded as: Nasdaq: DGII; S&P 600 component
- Industry: Industrial Internet of Things (IIoT)
- Founded: 1985; 41 years ago
- Headquarters: Hopkins, Minnesota, United States
- Number of locations: United States, Canada, Australia, Germany, Spain, UK, Singapore, China, Japan
- Key people: Ron Konezny (CEO)
- Revenue: ▲US$430 million (2025)
- Net income: ▲US$40.8 million (2025)
- Number of employees: 550
- Website: digi.com

Digi International, Inc. is an American industrial Internet of things technology company based in Hopkins, Minnesota. Founded in 1985, it was best known in the early 1990s as a manufacturer of multi-line serial data serial cards for PC clones, allowing these machines to run multi-line bulletin board systems (BBSes). As this market began to wind down with the rise of the internet in the late 1990s, Digi began to concentrate on network attached devices and industrial monitoring.

== History ==
The company was founded in 1985 and went public as Digi International in 1989.

The company initially offered intelligent ISA/PCI boards (the 'DigiBoard') with multiple asynchronous serial interfaces for PCs.

The company's current CEO and president, Ron Konezny, joined the company in December 2014.

=== Patents ===
Digi International settled a patent infringement lawsuit with U.S. Ethernet Innovations LLC for $1.525 million in April 2013.

In 2022, NimbeLink, a subsidiary of Airgain, filed a lawsuit alleging certain Digi products infringed on NimbeLink's Skywire cellular modems. The U.S. District Court for the District of Minnesota found all patent claims by Nimbelink to be invalid in May 2024.

== Acquisitions ==
Since the early 1990s, Digi International has acquired numerous companies. In the 1990s, Digi acquired companies including Arnet Corp, Stargate and Milan Technologies, Lan Access, Aetherworks, Centrall Data Corp, and German-based ITK International Inc.

In 2000, Digi acquired Texas-based USB connectivity manufacturer Inside Out Networks, and phased the brand out in 2006. In 2002, the company acquired Net Silicon, a fabless manufacturer of ARM-based microprocessors.

In 2005, Digi acquired Rabbit Semiconductor, a manufacturer of Z180 based silicon, embedded modules and single-board computers. In the same year, the company acquired processor module manufacturers FS Forth-Systeme GmbH of Breisach, Germany, and Logroño, Spain-based Sistemas Embebidos S.A.

In 2006, the company acquired Wireless technology company MaxStream, for $38.8M. Two years later, in 2008, Digi acquired Cellular router manufacturer Sarian Systems Ltd. for $30.5 million. In the same year, Digi also acquired wireless technology design services company Spectrum Design Solutions Inc.

In 2009, Digi acquired Mobiapps, a fabless manufacturer of satellite modems on the Orbcomm satellite network.

In 2012, Digi acquired Cloud computing services provider Etherios.

Digi acquired Toronto-based temperature monitoring company Bluenica in 2015. A year later, in 2016, Digi acquired FreshTemps, temperature monitoring and task management for the food industry.

In 2017, Digi acquired SMART Temps and TempAlert, two temperature and task management providers for retail, education, food service, healthcare, and industrial applications. A year later, in 2018, Digi acquired Network equipment company Accelerated Concepts.

Digi acquired Utah-based Opengear, a computer network technology company in 2019.

In 2021, Digi acquired Haxiot, a provider of wireless connection services; Ctek, a company specializing in remote monitoring and industrial controls; and Ventus Holdings, a telecommunications company.

In 2025, Digi acquired Jolt Software for $145.5 million.

In 2026, Digi acquired Particle, an IoT hardware and software company.
