= Xircom =

Former American business enterprise

Xircom, Inc.
- Company type: Public
- Founded: 1988; 38 years ago in Thousand Oaks, California
- Founders: Dirk Gates; Kirk Mathews
- Defunct: 2001; 25 years ago
- Fate: Acquired by Intel
- Products: Modems; Personal digital assistants
- Website: xircom.com at the Wayback Machine (archived 2000-03-01)

Xircom, Inc., was an American computer networking hardware and mobile technology company. Headquartered in Thousand Oaks, California, Xircom was one of the first companies to develop network computing products for notebook computers. Products included computer memory cards, LAN adapters, modems, and remote access server products. The company's products enabled notebook users to share information over a network connection.

During its existence, the company possessed manufacturing facilities in Penang, Malaysia, and international offices throughout Europe and the Asia Pacific. In 2001, Intel acquired Xircom and in early 2003 laid off most of Xircom's Thousand Oaks employees.

== History ==
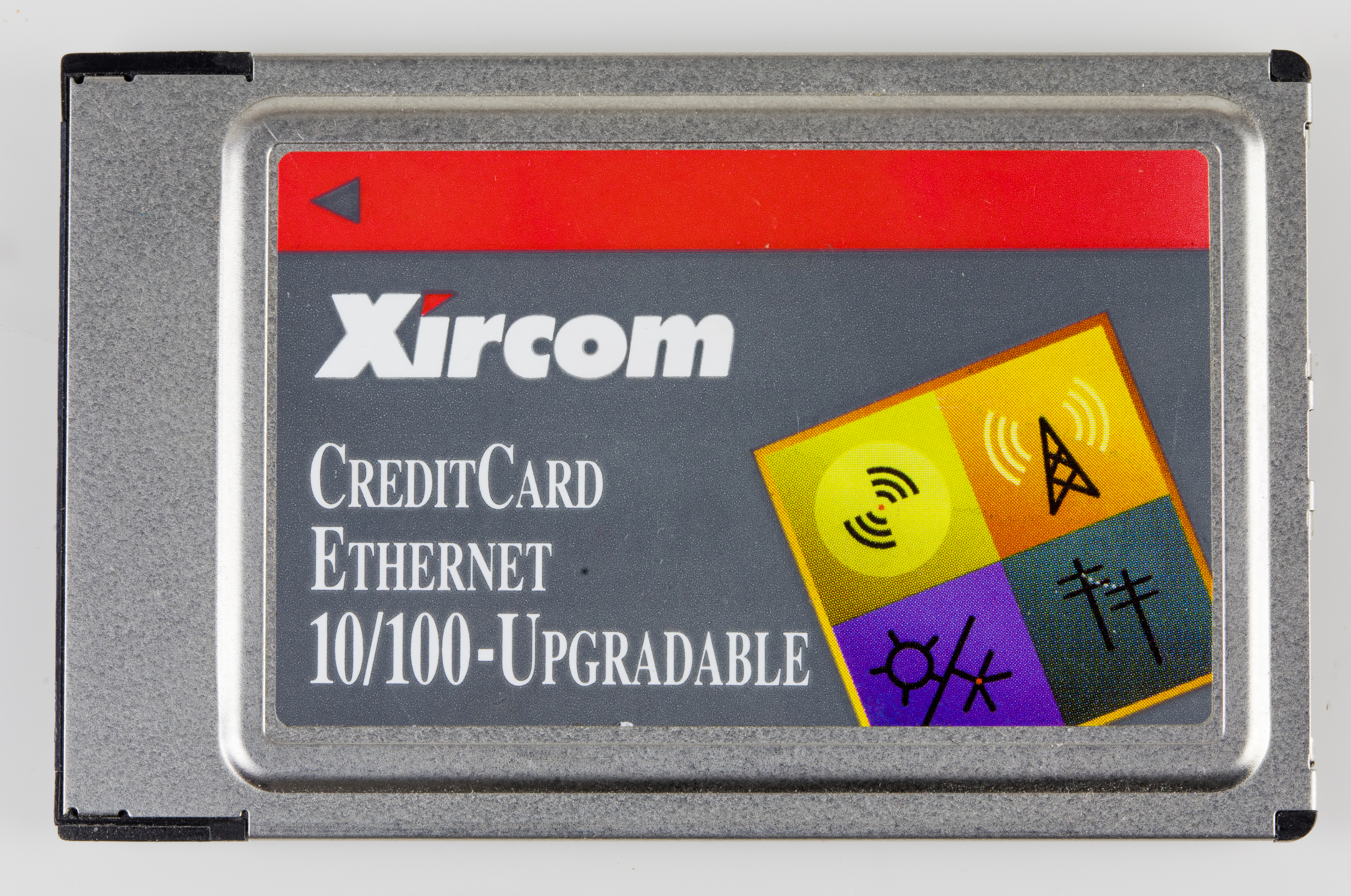
An Ethernet PC Card manufactured by Xircom

The company was founded in 1988 by Dirk Gates and Kirk Mathews on the premise of delivering modem and Ethernet connectivity to mobile computers. The company grew to over 2,000 employees and achieved revenues of $500M and a market cap in excess of $2B. Mobility solutions were based on IEEE 802.11, GPRS, and Bluetooth technologies.

Xircom was known as an innovative leader in networking technology, pioneering the world's first wireless networking devices for portable computers, known as Netwave. Xircom's NetWave adapters boasted a raw data rate of 1M bit/sec (blazing fast at the time) and fostered the creation and development of today's WiFi infrastructure and devices, which are virtually everywhere today.

Xircom was also equally innovative in its working environment. Employees were encouraged to express their creative natures, fostering a positive and creative environment where new ideas and efficiency flowed as easily as the waterfall in its indoor fish pond, which was originally constructed in front of the Engineering Vice President's cubicle as a joke.

== Products ==
=== Pocket LAN Adapter ===
In 1988, the only universal connection available on notebook PCs was the printer port, so Xircom devised the Pocket LAN Adapter that attached to the printer port and connected the notebook PC to a network. Xircom then became one of the top providers of networking computing devices.

=== RealPort ===
Xircom was renowned for its PC Cards, the most well known of which was the RealPort series designed by boutique start-up ID firm Next Planet. The 32-bit RealPort CardBus Ethernet 10/100+Modem 56 combined 10/100 Mbit/s Ethernet, a 56K modem, and even GSM connectivity via an externally connected Mobile Phone, in a single dongle-free Integrated PC Card solution. RealPort family of cards solved the major problem mobile users experienced with PC Cards: lost, forgotten, or broken cable connectors and broken pop-out jacks. By eliminating fragile dongles on the device, the RealPort Integrated PC Cards provided robust and reliable communications by integrating connectors directly into the card.

=== NetAccess ===
NetAccess Series Remote Access cards (RAS) included models ISDN, and the world's first multiport modem (MPM-4 and MPM-8).

=== REX 6000 ===
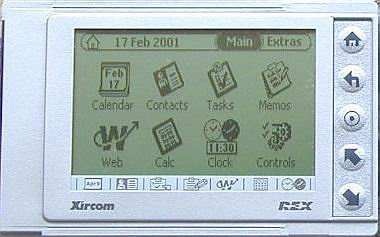
Xircom REX 6000, at the time the world's smallest full function PDA

The REX 6000 was an ultra-thin PDA produced by Xircom. It was the world's smallest full-function PDA due to its size as a Type II PC Card. The REX synchronized by insertion into a host PC's PCMCIA/PC Card slot. The REX 6000 was similar to its predecessor (the Franklin REX 5000) except it included a touch screen, among other improvements.

=== PortGear & PortStation ===
Xircom acquired Entrega, a small company that produced the USB upgrade boards (for people with older PCs lacking USB connectors) and converters (USB to serial, to parallel, to Ethernet). It turned these products into its own Port-Gear line, including special drivers to support USB in Windows NT v4 systems.

=== Handheld products ===
Before being purchased by Intel in 2001, Xircom made a series of innovative connectivity devices for handheld computers, including the CompactFlash (Ethernet, Modem, GSM, etc.), SpringPort modules for Handspring, and sleds for Palm.

== Acquisition ==
On January 15, 2001 Intel announced that it would acquire Xircom for approximately 748 Million US$.
