= Cc65 =

65(C)02 cross development software

cc65
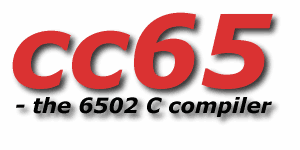
- Developer: Ullrich von Bassewitz
- Release: November 15, 1998; 27 years ago
- Stable release: 2.19 / November 20, 2020; 5 years ago
- Written in: ANSI C
- Operating system: Multiplatform
- Type: Cross compiler
- License: zlib License
- Website: cc65.github.io
- Repository: github.com/cc65/cc65

cc65 is a cross development package for 6502 and 65C02 targets, including a macro assembler, a C cross compiler, linker, librarian and several other tools.

== Overview ==
cc65 is based on a native C compiler that was originally adapted for the Atari 8-bit computers by John R. Dunning in 1989, which originated as a Small-C descendant. It has several extensions, and some of the limits of the original Small C compiler are gone.

The toolkit has largely been expanded by Ullrich von Bassewitz and other contributors. The actual cc65 compiler, a complete set of binary tools (assembler, linker, etc.) and runtime library are under a license identical to zlib's.

The compiler itself comes close to ANSI C compatibility, while C library features depend on the target platform's hardware. stdio is supported on many platforms, as is Borland-style conio.h screen handling. GEOS is also supported on the Commodore 64 and the Apple II. The library supports Commodore 8-bit systems, Apple II, Atari 8-bit computers, Oric Atmos, Nintendo Entertainment System, Watara Supervision game console, Synertek Systems SYM-1 and Ohio Scientific Challenger 1P.

Officially supported host systems include Linux, Windows, MS-DOS and OS/2, but the source code itself has been reported to work almost unmodified on many platforms besides these.

The ca65 macro assembler supports 6502, 65C02, and 65C816 processors, and can be used standalone without the C compiler.

== Supported API ==
=== static ===
- conio (text-based console I/O non-scrolling)
- dio (block-oriented disk I/O bypassing the file system)

=== dynamic ===
- em (expanded memory, used for all kinds of memory beyond the 6502's 64K barrier, similar EMS)
- joystick (relative input devices)
- mouse (absolute input devices)
- serial (communication)
- tgi (2D graphics primitives inspired by BGI)

	conio	dio	emd	joy	mou	ser	tgi
apple2	Yes	Yes	1	1	1	1	2
apple2enh	Yes	Yes	1	1	1	1	2
atari	Yes	Yes		2			15
atmos	Yes						1
c16	Yes		1	1			
c64	Yes		6	4	3	1	1
c128	Yes		5	2	3	1	2
cbm510	Yes		1	1		1	
cbm610	Yes		1			1	
geos	Yes	Yes	1	1			1
lynx				1		1	1
nes	Yes			1			1
osic1p	Yes						
pet	Yes			1			
plus4	Yes			1		1	
supervision							
sym1							
vic20	Yes			2			

Note: For static libraries, "Yes" means the feature is available. For dynamic libraries, the columns list the number of available drivers.
