= List of Intellivision games =

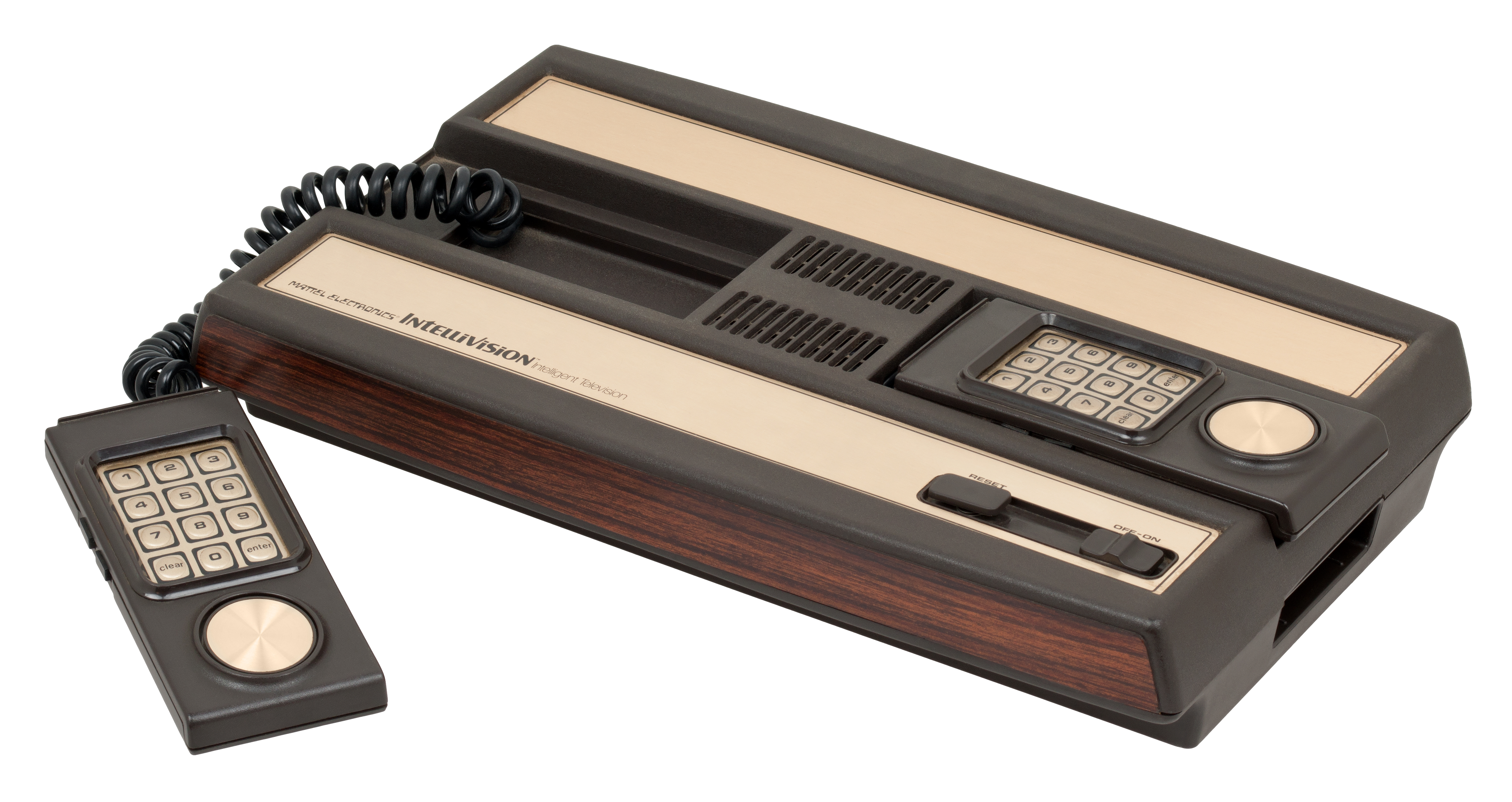
The Intellivision

This is a list of cartridges and cassettes for the Intellivision game system. Some cartridges were branded as both Mattel Electronics and Sears Tele-Games, and later republished by INTV Corp. as Intellivision Inc. Between 1979 and 1989, a total of 132 titles were released:

- 118 cartridges plus one compilation cartridge for the Master Component
- 6 cartridges for the ECS Computer Adapter
- 7 cassettes and 1 cartridge for the Keyboard Component

The main reference for this is the Game Catalog of IntellivisionLives.com. Some games were also published under different names when they were re-released as Intellivision Lives!.

== Table key ==
^	For two players only
*	Compilation of previously released games
†	Intellivoice voice synthesis cartridge
‡	ECS Computer Adapter cartridge
§	Keyboard Component cassette

All early games published by Mattel Electronics were categorized by "Network". Each network had its own color that was used for the game box. The network concept was abandoned in late 1982.

Sports network
Action network
Space Action network
Strategy network
Gaming network
Children's Learning network
Arcade network

== Master component releases ==
Cartridges released during the production life of the Intellivision from 1979 to 1990. Intellivoice cartridges are included here. Although designed to be played with speech, the Intellivoice cartridges do run without the Intellivoice peripheral.

Title	Genre	Developer	Publisher	Released	Notes
Auto Racing	Racing	APh Technological Consulting	Mattel Electronics	NA: 1980-10-03	Running change with steering changed from "directional" to "realistic" (left/right).
Boxing ^	Sports	APh Technological Consulting	Mattel Electronics	NA: 1981-10-21	Two players required.
Major League Baseball ^	Sports	APh Technological Consulting	Mattel Electronics	NA: 1979	aka Baseball, Big League Baseball; Two players required.
NASL Soccer ^	Sports	APh Technological Consulting	Mattel Electronics	NA: 1980-09-04	aka Soccer; Two players required.
NBA Basketball ^	Sports	APh Technological Consulting	Mattel Electronics	NA: 1979	aka Basketball; Two players required.
NFL Football ^	Sports	APh Technological Consulting	Mattel Electronics	NA: 1979	aka Football; Two players required.
NHL Hockey ^	Sports	APh Technological Consulting	Mattel Electronics	NA: 1980-10-03	aka Hockey; Two players required.
PBA Bowling	Sports	Mattel Electronics	Mattel Electronics	NA: 1981-07-31	aka Bowling
PGA Golf	Sports	APh Technological Consulting	Mattel Electronics	NA: 1980-11-05	aka Golf
Tennis ^	Sports	APh Technological Consulting	Mattel Electronics	NA: 1980-12-10	Two players required. In addition to Gavin Claypool, programming credits are also given to Chris Lutz.
U.S. Ski Team Skiing	Sports	APh Technological Consulting	Mattel Electronics	NA: 1980-12-10	aka Skiing. In addition to Scott Reynolds, programming credits are also given to Terry Ligocki.
Advanced Dungeons & Dragons	Action-adventure	APh Technological Consulting	Mattel Electronics	NA: 1982-08-16	aka Advanced Dungeons & Dragons Cloudy Mountain, Adventure, Crown of Kings; Programming by Chris Hawley, Tom Soulanille, and Tom Loughry.
Armor Battle ^	Action	APh Technological Consulting	Mattel Electronics	NA: 1979-11	Running change with faster tank turning. Two players required.
Frog Bog	Platform	APh Technological Consulting	Mattel Electronics	NA: 1982-05-25	
Lock 'N' Chase	Maze	Mattel Electronics	Mattel Electronics	NA: 1982-07-09	
Night Stalker	Stealth	Mattel Electronics	Mattel Electronics	NA: 1982-05-16	
Sea Battle ^	Action, Strategy	APh Technological Consulting	Mattel Electronics	NA: 1980-10-03	Two players required.
Shark! Shark!	Action	Mattel Electronics	Mattel Electronics	NA: 1982-12-06	
Sharp Shot		APh Technological Consulting	Mattel Electronics	NA: 1982-10-28	designed for voice activated control for TV Powww call-in game show
Snafu	Action	Mattel Electronics	Mattel Electronics	NA: 1981-10-15	
Sub Hunt	Action, Simulation	APh Technological Consulting	Mattel Electronics	NA: 1982-05-06	Programming by John Hershberger and Tom Loughry
Triple Action ^	Action	APh Technological Consulting	Mattel Electronics	NA: 1981-10-15	album cartridge: Battle Tanks, Racing Cars, and Biplanes; Two players required for Biplanes and Battle Tanks. In addition to Rich O'Keefe, programming credits are also given to Shal Farley.
Tron: Deadly Discs	Action	Mattel Electronics	Mattel Electronics	NA: 1982-09	
Tron: Maze-A-Tron	Action	Mattel Electronics	Mattel Electronics	NA: 1982-10-06	
Astrosmash	Shooter	Mattel Electronics	Mattel Electronics	NA: 1981-10-15	
Space Armada	Shooter	APh Technological Consulting	Mattel Electronics	NA: 1981-10-15	
Space Battle	Action	APh Technological Consulting	Mattel Electronics	NA: 1980-08-25	Originally part of Action network. Running change added a fifth "super advanced" difficulty level.
Space Hawk	Action	Mattel Electronics	Mattel Electronics	NA: 1982-04-19	
Star Strike	Action	APh Technological Consulting	Mattel Electronics	NA: 1981-12-22	Running change fixes bug with left controller.
ABPA Backgammon	Board Game	APh Technological Consulting	Mattel Electronics	NA: 1979-11	aka Backgammon
Checkers	Board Game	APh Technological Consulting	Mattel Electronics	NA: 1979	aka Draughts in some markets
Reversi	Board Game	APh Technological Consulting	Mattel Electronics	NA: 1982-05-11	
USCF Chess	Board Game	Mattel Electronics Teletape Inc.	Mattel Electronics	NA: 1982-11-23	aka Chess
Utopia	Construction and management simulation	Mattel Electronics	Mattel Electronics	NA: 1982-06-03	Credited as the game that spawned the construction and management simulation genre. For one or two players.
Horse Racing	Gambling	APh Technological Consulting	Mattel Electronics	NA: 1980-10-03	
Las Vegas Poker & Blackjack	Gambling	APh Technological Consulting	Mattel Electronics	NA: 1979-11	aka Blackjack & Poker; pack-in cartridge 1979-1982
Las Vegas Roulette	Gambling	APh Technological Consulting	Mattel Electronics	NA: 1980-10-03	Programmed by Walter Bright Intellivision Lives also credits John Brooks.
Royal Dealer	Card Game	APh Technological Consulting	Mattel Electronics	NA: 1982-09	
The Electric Company: Math Fun	Educational	APh Technological Consulting	Mattel Electronics	NA: 1979-11	aka Math Masters; Running change had digit entry changed from right to left to left to right.
The Electric Company: Word Fun	Educational	APh Technological Consulting	Mattel Electronics	NA: 1980-11-05	album cartridge: Crosswords, Word Hunt, and Word Rockets. In addition to Kevin Miller, programming credits are also given to Don Bacon.
Vectron	Shooter	Mattel Electronics	Mattel Electronics	NA: 1983-03	
B-17 Bomber †	Action	Mattel Electronics	Mattel Electronics	NA: 1982-07-23	
Bomb Squad †	Puzzle	Mattel Electronics	Mattel Electronics	NA: 1982-09-14	
Space Spartans †	Action	Mattel Electronics	Mattel Electronics	NA: 1982-06-29	
Tron: Solar Sailer †	Action	Mattel Electronics	Mattel Electronics	NA: 1983-02	
Advanced Dungeons & Dragons: Treasure of Tarmin	Role-playing	APh Technological Consulting	Mattel Electronics	NA: 1983-10	aka Minotaur
Bump 'n' Jump	Racing	Technology Consultants	Mattel Electronics	NA: 1983	
BurgerTime	Maze	Mattel Electronics	Mattel Electronics	NA: 1983	
Buzz Bombers	Shooter	Mattel Electronics	Mattel Electronics	NA: 1983-07	
Kool-Aid Man	Action	Mattel Electronics	Mattel Electronics	NA: 1983-11	
Loco-Motion	Puzzle	Mattel Electronics	Mattel Electronics	NA: 1983	
Masters of the Universe: The Power of He-Man	Action	Mattel Electronics	Mattel Electronics	NA: 1983-11	
Mission X	Shooter	Mattel Electronics	Mattel Electronics	NA: 1983	
Motocross	Racing	Mattel Electronics	Mattel Electronics	NA: 1983-10	
Pinball	Action	Mattel Electronics	Mattel Electronics	NA: 1983	
Beamrider	Shooter	Cheshire Engineering	Activision	NA: 1983	
Happy Trails	Puzzle	Activision	Activision	NA: 1983	
Pitfall!	Platform	Activision	Activision	NA: 1982-11	
River Raid	Shooter	Activision	Activision	NA: 1983-12	
Stampede	Shooter	Activision	Activision	NA: 1982-12	
The Dreadnaught Factor	Action	Cheshire Engineering	Activision	NA: 1983	
Worm Whomper	Shooter	Cheshire Engineering	Activision	NA: 1983	
Centipede	Shooter	Atari	Atarisoft	NA: 1984-02	
Defender	Shooter	Atari	Atarisoft	NA: 1983	
Pac-Man	Maze	Atari	Atarisoft	NA: 1983	Later re-released by INTV Corporation.
Carnival	Shooter	Roklan	Coleco	NA: 1982	
Donkey Kong	Platform	Roklan	Coleco	NA: 1982-08	
Donkey Kong Jr.	Platform	Roklan	Coleco	NA: 1983	
Lady Bug	Maze		Coleco	NA: 1983	
Mouse Trap	Maze	Roklan	Coleco	NA: 1983-01	
Turbo	Racing		Coleco	NA: 1984-01	
Venture	Action-adventure	Roklan	Coleco	NA: 1983	
Zaxxon	Shooter	Roklan	Coleco	NA: 1983	
Atlantis	Shooter	Imagic	Imagic	NA: 1982-10	
Beauty & the Beast	Platform	Imagic	Imagic	NA: 1982-10	
Demon Attack	Shooter	Imagic	Imagic	NA: 1982	
Dracula	Action	Imagic	Imagic	NA: 1983-03	
Dragonfire	Action	Imagic	Imagic	NA: 1982	
Fathom	Action-adventure	Imagic	Imagic	NA: 1983	
Ice Trek	Action	Imagic	Imagic	NA: 1983	
Microsurgeon	Action, Simulation	Imagic	Imagic	NA: 1982-10	
Nova Blast	Shooter	Imagic	Imagic	NA: 1983	
Safecracker	Action	Imagic	Imagic	NA: 1983	
Swords & Serpents	Action-adventure	Imagic	Imagic	NA: 1982	
Tropical Trouble	Platform	Imagic	Imagic	NA: 1982	
Truckin'	Driving, Simulation	Imagic	Imagic	NA: 1983	
White Water!	Action	Imagic	Imagic	NA: 1983	
Blockade Runner	Shooter	Interphase Technologies Inc.	Interphase Technologies Inc.	NA: 1983	
Sewer Sam	Shooter	Interphase Technologies Inc.	Interphase Technologies Inc.	NA: 1983	
Frogger	Platform	Roklan	Parker Brothers	NA: 1983	
Popeye	Platform	Roklan	Parker Brothers	NA: 1983	
Q*bert	Platform	Roklan	Parker Brothers	NA: 1983	
Star Wars: The Empire Strikes Back	Shooter	Roklan	Parker Brothers	NA: 1983	
Super Cobra	Shooter	Roklan	Parker Brothers	NA: 1983	Was not available in the United States.
Tutankham	Shooter	Roklan	Parker Brothers	NA: 1983	Was not available in the United States.
Congo Bongo	Platform	Beck-Tech	Sega	NA: 1983	
Championship Tennis	Sports	Nice Ideas	Dextell Ltd.	NA: 1986; EU: 1985	
World Cup Soccer	Sports	Nice Ideas	Dextell Ltd.	NA: 1986; EU: 1985	When used with the ECS Computer Adapter up-to four controllers and cooperative two-player game-play is supported. aka Super Soccer
Body Slam: Super Pro Wrestling	Action	Realtime Associates	INTV Corporation	NA: 1988	
Chip Shot: Super Pro Golf	Sports	Realtime Associates	INTV Corporation	NA: 1987-06	
Commando	Shooter	Realtime Associates	INTV Corporation	NA: 1987-10	
Dig Dug	Action	Atari	INTV Corporation	NA: 1987-06	
Diner	Action	Realtime Associates, Mattel Electronics	INTV Corporation	NA: 1987-06	
Hover Force	Action	Realtime Associates, Mattel Electronics	INTV Corporation	NA: 1986	Programmed with ChromaDepth 3-D technology and shown publicly by Mattel Electronics as HoverForce 3-D at 1984 January CES. Released by INTV with modified game-play, 3-D glasses not included.
Learning Fun I	Educational	Realtime Associates, Mattel Electronics	INTV Corporation	NA: 1987-06	aka Factor Fun; also includes Math Master from Math Fun cartridge
Learning Fun II	Educational	Realtime Associates, Mattel Electronics	INTV Corporation	NA: 1987-10	aka Memory Fun; also includes Word Rockets, Word Hunt, Crosswords from Word Fun cartridge
Mountain Madness: Super Pro Skiing	Sports	Realtime Associates, APh Technological Consulting	INTV Corporation	NA: 1988	updated U.S. Ski Team Skiing
Pole Position	Racing	Realtime Associates	INTV Corporation	NA: 1988	
Slam Dunk: Super Pro Basketball	Sports	Realtime Associates, APh Technological Consulting	INTV Corporation	NA: 1987-10	updated NBA Basketball
Slap Shot: Super Pro Hockey	Sports	Realtime Associates, APh Technological Consulting	INTV Corporation	NA: 1987-10	updated NHL Hockey
Spiker! Super Pro Volleyball	Sports	Realtime Associates	INTV Corporation	NA: 1989	
Stadium Mud Buggies	Racing	Realtime Associates	INTV Corporation	NA: 1989	
Super Pro Decathlon	Sports	Realtime Associates	INTV Corporation	NA: 1988	
Super Pro Football	Sports	Realtime Associates, APh Technological Consulting	INTV Corporation	NA: 1986	updated NFL Football
Thin Ice	Action	Mattel Electronics	INTV Corporation	NA: 1986	
Thunder Castle	Maze	Mattel Electronics	INTV Corporation	NA: 1985	
Tower of Doom	Role-playing	Realtime Associates, Mattel Electronics	INTV Corporation	NA: 1987-03	Programmed by Daniel Bass as ADVANCED DUNGEONS & DRAGONS Tower of Mystery Cartridge. Game-play and strategy was incomplete when Mattel Electronics closed in 1984. John Tomlinson prepared the game for the 1987 INTV release.
Triple Challenge *	Board Game	Mattel Electronics Teletape Inc. APh Technological Consulting	INTV Corporation	NA: 1987-03	Compilation of previously released games Chess, Checkers, and Backgammon
World Championship Baseball	Sports	APh Technological Consulting	INTV Corporation	NA: 1985	aka All-Star Major League Baseball; updated Major League Baseball

== Entertainment Computer System releases ==
With one exception the following cartridges require the ECS Computer Adapter and either the Computer Keyboard or Music Synthesizer peripherals.

Title	Genre	Developer	Publisher	Released	Notes
The Jetsons' Ways With Words ‡	Educational	Mattel Electronics	Mattel Electronics	NA: 1983	Developed with Mattel's Educational Product Department.
Melody Blaster ‡	Music	Mattel Electronics	Mattel Electronics	NA: 1983	designed for the Music Synthesizer piano keyboard
Mind Strike ‡	Strategy	Mattel Electronics	Mattel Electronics	NA: 1983	
Mr. Basic Meets Bits 'N Bytes ‡	Educational	Mattel Electronics	Mattel Electronics	NA: 1983	runs without the ECS Computer Module with limited features
Scooby Doo's Maze Chase ‡	Stealth	Mattel Electronics	Mattel Electronics	NA: 1983	
World Series Major League Baseball † ‡	Sports	Mattel Electronics	Mattel Electronics	NA: 1983	aka Super Series Big League Baseball; First sports simulation and management video-game.

== Keyboard component releases ==
Keyboard Component cassettes had limited availability through direct mail or select markets. Only 4000 Keyboard Components were manufactured.

Title	Genre	Developer	Publisher	Released	Notes
BASIC Cassette & Cartridge	Programming	APh Technological Consulting, Microsoft	Mattel Electronics	NA: 1980	Based on Microsoft BASIC v2.0b for MOS 6502. Unique cartridge using one of the Keyboard Component I/O ports.
Conversational French §	Educational	APh Technological Consulting	Mattel Electronics	NA: 1981	Programming credits to Mark Stroberg, Scott Bishop, Alan Blanchard, Hal Finney, Kirsi Allison, John Tomlinson, John Brooks, Jon Buss.
Crosswords I §	Puzzle	Mattel Electronics	Mattel Electronics	NA: 1982	Requires the BASIC cartridge.
Crosswords II §	Puzzle	Mattel Electronics	Mattel Electronics	NA: 1982	Requires the BASIC cartridge.
Crosswords III §	Puzzle	Mattel Electronics	Mattel Electronics	NA: 1982	Requires the BASIC cartridge.
Family Budgeting §	Financial		Mattel Electronics	NA: 1982	Requires the BASIC cartridge.
Geography Challenge §	Educational	Mattel Electronics	Mattel Electronics	NA: 1982	Requires the BASIC cartridge. Programmed by Don Daglow and Julie Hoshizaki in BASIC.
Jack LaLanne's Physical Conditioning §	Fitness	APh Technological Consulting	Mattel Electronics	NA: 1981	Programming credits to Robby Butler, Tom Loughry, Hal Finney, John Brooks, Mark Stroberg.

== Unreleased ==
A list of Intellivision games that are playable but not released. Keyboard Component software on cassette tape are also included. Technical demos, store demos, and test cartridges are not included. Air Strike is one example that can be considered unfinished and is included in this list because the found prototype is playable. Hypnotic Lights is excluded because it is mostly a technical demo. Grid Shock is excluded due to lack of gameplay. Some were not released due to marketing decisions, others were due to Mattel Electronics shutting down in January 1984. Unless otherwise noted the reference source is the list of Unreleased Intellivision Games at IntellivisionLives.com.

In a 2014 interview, APh programmer Tom Loughry explains that in 1982 he and another APh programmer started a third Advanced Dungeons & Dragons game which was abandoned when he left the company. He also worked on a Keyboard Component cassette game Super Football whose completion status is unknown. In a 2015 interview with Russ Haft, manager of the Intellivision programming group at Atari, it is explained that in addition to the four games released versions of Joust, Jungle Hunt, Pole Position, and Missile Command were completed or close to completion. Missile Command would have been dropped because of poor playability. A June 1983 press release from CBS Electronics announces Wizard of War and Gorf to be released in July and Blueprint, Solar Fox, and Omega Race cartridges for August. This suggests Wizard of War and Gorf were completed and programming on the others were at least started. Other announced games such as Imagic Wing War and Moonsweeper have little information about their status.

Title	Genre	Developer	Publisher	Copyright	Notes
Adventures of TRON	Platform	APh Technological Consulting	Mattel Electronics	1982	An Atari 2600 conversion of Mazeatron converted back to Intellivision. Rejected by Mattel marketing.
Air Strike	Action	APh Technological Consulting	Mattel Electronics	1982	Unfinished but playable. Rejected by Mattel marketing. Released in 1998 Intellivision Lives! PC/Mac
Brickout!	Action	APh Technological Consulting	Mattel Electronics	1981	Created for the Triple Action cartridge. Dropped due to legal concerns. Released in 1998 Intellivision Lives! PC/Mac.
Chartcraft Stock Analysis §	Financial	APh Technological Consulting	Mattel Electronics		Keyboard Component cancelled. Programming credits to Jon Buss, Bill Chapman, Kevin Miller, Scott Reynolds.
Choplifter!	Action	Realtime Associates	INTV Corporation	1990	lacks some sound effects.
Deep Pockets Super Pro Pool & Billiards	Sports	Realtime Associates	INTV Corporation	1990	Released in 1998 Intellivision Lives! PC/Mac and Intellivision for PC Volume 2
Doubles Tennis	Sports	Mattel Electronics	Mattel Electronics	1982	Ray Kaestner updated the original Intellivision Tennis with computer controlled players and support for ECS four controllers. Unrelated to Championship Tennis.
Fireman	Action	Nice Ideas			
The Flintstones' Keyboard Fun ‡	Educational	Mattel Electronics	Mattel Electronics	1983	Developed with Mattel's Educational Product Department.
Game Factory ‡	Educational	Mattel Electronics	Mattel Electronics	1983	Video-game construction kit. Released in 2001 Intellivision Rocks
Gli Spartani Dello Spazio †	Action	Mattel Electronics	Mattel Electronics	1982	Space Spartans with Italian speech; requires the unreleased International Intellivoice
Go for the Gold *	Sports	Mattel Electronics	Mattel Electronics	1983	Compilation of previously released games Skiing, Hockey, Basketball, and Boxing
Hockey (Pong)	Action	APh Technological Consulting	Mattel Electronics	1981	Created for the Triple Action cartridge. Dropped due to legal concerns.
Illusions	Puzzle	Nice Ideas	Mattel Electronics	1983	
Jeanne Dixon Astrology §	Entertainment	APh Technological Consulting	Mattel Electronics		Keyboard Component cancelled. Programming credits to Kevin Miller, Greg Favor
Joust	Action	Atari	Atarisoft	1983	no known prototype found; unreleased due to market crash
Jungle Hunt	Action	Atari	Atarisoft	1983	no known prototype found; unreleased due to market crash
King of the Mountain	Action-adventure	Mattel Electronics	Mattel Electronics	1982	Lacks sound effects and only mountains 1 and 6 accessible. Programmed by Judy Mason. Released in 1998 Intellivision Lives! PC/Mac.
Land Battle ^	Action, Strategy	APh Technological Consulting	Mattel Electronics	1982	Two-players required. Cancelled by marketing. Released in 1998 Intellivision Lives! PC/Mac.
Las Vegas Craps	Gambling	APh Technological Consulting	Mattel Electronics		
League of Light	Music	Activision	Activision	1983	Released in 2001 Intellivision Rocks. Programmers, Russ Lieblich and Peter Kaminski, switched to Commodore 64 development and released the game as Master of the Lamps in 1985.
Les Spartiates De L'Espace †	Action	Mattel Electronics	Mattel Electronics	1982	Space Spartans with French speech; requires the unreleased International Intellivoice
Magic Carousel †	Children's Educational	Mattel Electronics	Mattel Electronics	1983	Postponed by Mattel marketing. Released in 2001 Intellivision Rocks
Magic Carpet	Action	Nice Ideas	Mattel Electronics		
Meteor	Shooter	Mattel Electronics	Mattel Electronics	1981	Unfinished but playable; embedded in Astrosmash. Dropped due to legal concerns. Released in 1998 Intellivision Lives! PC/Mac
Missile Command	Shooter	Atari	Atarisoft	1983	no known prototype found; unreleased due to poor playability
Number Jumble	Educational	Mattel Electronics	Mattel Electronics	1983	ECS provides scratchpad work area but plays without it. Developed with Mattel's Educational Product Department. Released in 1998 Intellivision Lives! PC/Mac.
Party Line: Blow Out	Party games	Mattel Electronics	Mattel Electronics	1983	Part of the Party Line album cartridge. Released in 2004 Intellivision Lives! for Nintendo DS
Party Line: Hard Hat	Party games	Nice Ideas	Mattel Electronics	1983	Part of the Party Line album cartridge. Released in 1998 Intellivision Lives! PC/Mac
Party Line: Space Cadet	Party games	Mattel Electronics	Mattel Electronics	1983	Part of the Party Line album cartridge. Released in 1998 Intellivision Lives! PC/Mac
PizzaTime	Maze	Nice Ideas	Mattel Electronics		BurgerTime sequel
Pole Position	Racing	Atari	Atarisoft	1983	no known prototype found; unreleased due to market crash
Robot Rubble	Action	Activision	Activision	1983	Released in 2001 Intellivision Rocks
Rocky & Bullwinkle	Puzzle	Mattel Electronics	Mattel Electronics	1983	Cancelled by new management.
Scarfinger	Action	Nice Ideas	Mattel Electronics	1983	Rejected by Mattel marketing.
Shootin' Gallery	Shooter	Imagic	Imagic		Atari 2600 version sold poorly.
Spartaner aus dem All †	Action	Mattel Electronics	Mattel Electronics	1982	Space Spartans with German speech; requires the unreleased International Intellivoice
Spelling Challenge §	Educational	APh Technological Consulting	Mattel Electronics	NA: 1982	Programmed by Peter Kaminski, who also worked on an unreleased Math Challenge.
Spina the Bee	Action	Nice Ideas	Mattel Electronics	1983	aka Zzzz! Spina the Bee. Based on a European cartoon character, popular with little girls. Rejected by Mattel marketing.
Super Football §	Sports	Mattel Electronics	Mattel Electronics	1980	Unfinished cassette for the Keyboard Component
Super NFL Football ‡	Sports	Mattel Electronics	Mattel Electronics	1983	
Takeover ^	Real-time strategy	APh Technological Consulting	Mattel Electronics	1982	Two-players required. Rejected by Mattel marketing. Released in 1998 Intellivision Lives! PC/Mac
Tetris	Puzzle	Realtime Associates			Programmed by David Warhol to test new PC development system; not for release.
Yogi's Frustration	Platform	Mattel Electronics	Mattel Electronics	1983	

== Tutorvision ==
White-cased game cartridges playable ONLY on the unreleased World Book Tutorvision console (which uses its own REXEC and REXGROM). Games were designed by World Book, J. Hakansson Associates, and programmed by Realtime Associates. The Tutorvision and cartridges listed below were developed in 1989 but not released.

Title	Genre	Developer	Publisher	Notes
Busy Bodies	Educational (young children)	Realtime Associates	World Book	
Geo Graphics	Educational	Realtime Associates	World Book	Geography Level 2
Jungle Math	Educational (young children)	Realtime Associates	World Book	
Map Mazes	Educational (young children)	Realtime Associates	World Book	Social Studies Level 1
Nounsense	Educational (young children)	Realtime Associates	World Book	
Shapes In Space	Educational (young children)	Realtime Associates	World Book	Math Level 1
Story Stopper	Educational	Realtime Associates	World Book	
Tale Teller	Educational (young children)	Realtime Associates	World Book	
Time Trip	Educational	Realtime Associates	World Book	
Time Trip (Canadian Edition)	Educational	Realtime Associates	World Book	
Tops In Terms	Educational	Realtime Associates	World Book	
Wordcalc	Educational	Realtime Associates	World Book	
Wordsmith	Educational	Realtime Associates	World Book	
Write It Right	Educational	Realtime Associates	World Book	
Zoo Review	Educational (young children)	Realtime Associates	World Book	

== Homebrew ==
Games created by Intellivision fans and hobbyists.

Title	Genre	Developer	Publisher	Released
4-Tris	Puzzle	Joe Zbiciak	Joe Zbiciak	NA: 2001
Minehunter	Puzzle	Ryan Kinnen	Ryan Kinnen	NA: 2004
Same Game and Robots		Michael Hayes, David Harley	Michael Hayes, David Harley	NA: 2004
Stonix		Arnauld Chevallier, David Harley, Heather Harley	Arnauld Chevallier, David Harley, Heather Harley	NA: 2004
Space Patrol	Shooter	Joe Zbiciak	Joe Zbiciak	NA: 2007
Blix	Puzzle	Michael Hayes	Good Deal Games	NA: 2014
Piggy Bank	Action	Mark Ball	BBWW Games	NA: 2015
Christmas Carol vs. The Ghost Of Christmas Presents	Action	James Pujals	Left Turn Only	WW: 2012
Frankenstein's Monster		2600 Connection		2021
GoSub		2600 Connection		2016
Peter the Pea		2600 Connection		2022
Pumpkin Master		2600 Connection		2018
Space Raid		2600 Connection		2020
Upmonsters		2600 Connection		2018
Zombie Madness		2600 Connection		2020
Amigo Cornhole		5-11 Under Productions		2023
Which Way?		5-11 Under Productions		2025
Zig-Zap Zip Zap		5-11 Under Productions		2025

== Related pages ==
- Lists of video games
