= Dracula (1983 video game) =

- Developer: Imagic
- Publisher: Imagic
- Designer: Alan Smith
- Platform: Intellivision
- Release: March 1983
- Modes: Single-player, multiplayer

Dracula is a 1983 video game by Imagic for the Intellivision. In the game, the player controls Dracula who must attack his victims at night before sunrise and return to his coffin. Along the way, he must avoid enemies such as vultures, wolves and the police.

Contemporary reviews of the game mentioned the graphics and gameplay unique to the Intellivision, with some viewers commenting on the level of violence.

== Gameplay ==
Dracula can be played as a single-player game, or two players taking turns. In the single-player game, the player takes on the role of Dracula as he attempts to bite an allotted amount of victims such as joggers and other neighbours to maintain his strength between midnight and 6:00 am. Dracula is moved by the disc controller. The player must avoid obstacles such as wolves, vultures and the police. Dracula has the power to turn a police officer into a zombie and attack the other police.

In a two-player game, each player can take turns playing as Dracula, or one player can be Dracula while the other assumes the role of one of his victims. The second player is awarded points for avoiding Dracula's bite attacks.

== Development ==
Dracula was a third-party software developed for Mattel's Intellivision video game system. While most games developed for the system were ports of games made for other systems, there were some console exclusive games, including Dracula. Dracula was designed by Alan Smith and Wilfredo Aguilar helped out with some of the graphics.

== Reception ==
Gameplay of Dracula. Contemporary reviews from The Video Game Update and Video Games complimented the graphics.

Dracula was released for the Intellivision in March 1983 where it was published by Imagic.

From contemporary reviews, The Video Game Update gave the game a positive review, noting that the graphics and sound effects were quite good with only the vulture being slightly weak because it was "a bit blocky." Perry Greenberg of Video Games magazine said the game had made Imagic prove "once again that it can make captivating games that make extraordinary use of Intellivisision's graphic capabilities." Michael Blanchet of Electronic Fun with Computers & Games found the game most fun with the two-player mode, noting that he had little use for the zombie. Blanchet also complimented the humour in the game, noting the victims "scurrying around in fear, they nonchalantly stroll their merry way, oblivious to the fact that they are about to lose their jugular to some maniac." Greenberg wrote that the gameplay was varied enough to sustain interest, but controlling the game was difficult for more sudden and rapid movement. Mark Brownstein of JoyStik gave the game a three-star rating out of five, referring to it as a "so-so game" with limited strategy and occasional rapid reflexes, but was still a unique game for the Intellivision.

Some reviewers commented on the potential violence in the game, with The Video Game Update and Blanchet saying it was not as gruesome as it sounded, while Brownstein noted that "unless you relish games where you score points for killing people and not just alien spaceships, you may think twice before you buy it."

In 1984, the editors of Electronic Games magazine awarded Dracula the "Certificate of Merit" in their year-end awards for "Videogame of the Year (Less than 16K ROM memory)". From retrospective reviews, Brett Weiss in his book Classic Home Video Games 1972-1984 commented that the gameplay in Dracula was somewhat repetitive, but found the game worthwhile due to its atmospheric graphics, specifically the detailed backgrounds and the time passage being illustrated through a sky which changes colour. Retro Gamer included Dracula in their list of top ten games for the Intellivision. The writers of the magazine stated the game was well loved by collectors and noted the graphics and that "nothing complicated [in Dracula], but what there is is presented brilliantly."

== See also ==
- Count Dracula in popular culture
- List of Intellivision games
