= Vectron =

Vectron can refer to:

- Vectron (locomotive), a European locomotive produced by Siemens from 2010
- Vectron International, an American manufacturer of crystal oscillators and related electronic products acquired by Microsemi
- RCG Vectron, a part of the Reliance Insurance Company
- Vectron, a video game for the Mattel Intellivision
- Vectron, a ZX Spectrum video game published by Firebird Software in 1985, based on the Disney film Tron
