= Standard Television Interface Circuit =

The AY-3-8900, also known as the Standard Television Interface Chip or STIC, is a video display controller (VDC) produced by General Instrument for use with their CP1600 CPU in games consoles. It is best known as the basis for the Mattel Intellivision.

The STIC is typical of VDCs of the era, using a grid of character-like cells to draw a background graphic and then using up to eight sprites they called "movable objects" (MOBs), to produce animation. The overall resolution is 167 × 105 pixels in NTSC (in the 8900-1 model) and 168 × 104 pixels in PAL (8900 model), but only visible in an area of 159 × 96 pixels. The extra pixels around the visible area allow sprites to be placed in those locations and then smoothly move on-screen. The background consists of a 20 × 12 grid of 8×8 patterns known as "cards", which can be used as characters or other shapes. The STIC also computes collision information between the objects and screen borders.

== Characteristics ==
- able to operate up to 4 MHz, but is generally run at 3.579545 MHz (NTSC)
- 14-bit multiplexed data/address bus shared with CPU
- 20×12 tiled playfield, tiles are 8×8 pixels for a resolution of 159×96 (right pixel not displayed)
  - 16 color palette, two colors per tile
  - Foreground/Background mode; all 16 colors available for background and colors 1–8 available for foreground per tile; grom cards limited to the first 64
  - Color Stack mode; all 16 colors available for foreground per tile; background colour from a four colour rotating stack of any four colors, all 277 grom and gram cards available
  - Colored Squares mode allows each tile to have four different colored 4×4 blocks as in Snafu); first seven colors available for foreground blocks; background colour from the color stack
- 8 sprites (all visible on the same scanline). Hardware supports the following features per-sprite:
  - coordinate addressable off screen for smooth edge entries and exits
  - Size selection: 8×16 or 8 pixels wide by 8 half-pixels high
  - Stretching: horizontal (1× or 2×) and vertical (1×, 2×, 4× or 8×)
  - Mirroring: horizontal and vertical
  - Collision detection: sprite to sprite, sprite to background, and sprite to screen border
  - Priority: selects whether sprite appears in front of or behind background.
- fine horizontal and vertical pixel scrolling
- all STIC attributes and GRAM re-programmable at VBLANK, 60 times a second

== Color Palette ==
The chip generates a sixteen color palette, based on four bit input and divided into two sets. The following table shows bit and YIQ values as presented in technical information:

AY-3-8900 color palette
Color Set	Color	Bits	Y	I	Q
Primary	Black	0000	0.000	0.000	0.000
Primary	Blue	0001	0.330	-0.733	+0.660
Primary	Red	0010	0.523	+0.666	+0.200
Primary	Tan	0011	0.715	+0.266	-0.133
Primary	Dark Green	0100	0.413	-0.133	-0.600
Primary	Green	0101	0.577	-0.200	-0.533
Primary	Yellow	0110	0.853	+0.533	-0.333
Primary	White	0111	1.000	0.000	0.000
Pastel	Gray	1000	0.550	0.000	0.000
Pastel	Cyan	1001	0.660	-0.533	-0.266
Pastel	Orange	1010	0.687	+0.533	-0.066
Pastel	Brown	1011	0.330	+0.266	-0.266
Pastel	Magenta	1100	0.550	+0.400	+0.667
Pastel	Light Blue	1101	0.660	-0.400	+0.400
Pastel	Yellow-Green	1110	0.687	+0.066	-0.533
Pastel	Purple	1111	0.440	+0.133	+0.533

Note: The displayed colors are approximate. Actual tones varied according to the analog television standard and quality of the CRT display.

== See also ==
- Thomson EF9345
- Motorola 6845
- TMS9918
- MOS Technology VIC-II
