= Monster Truck Rally (video game) =

1991 video game

- Scan of the front cover of the packaging
- Developer(s): Realtime Associates
- Publisher(s): INTV Corp.
- Composer(s): George Sanger
- Platform(s): Nintendo Entertainment System
- Release: NA: September 1991
- Genre(s): Off-road racing
- Mode(s): Single-player, multiplayer

Monster Truck Rally is an off-road racing video game developed by Realtime Associates for the Nintendo Entertainment System (NES), and published by INTV Corp. in 1991.

== Gameplay ==
In the game, monster trucks rally on long dirt tracks; compete in special events such as automotive tug of war and sled-pulling; and perform maneuvers such as driving in doughnuts and crushing stationary cars. In Track Builder mode, players can design their own special stage to drive on.

Monster Truck Rally is one of a minority of NES software titles to support the NES Four Score and NES Satellite video game accessories, allowing up to four players to compete in the game.

This Box cover from 1991 features an illustration by Marc Ericksen.

== See also ==
- R.C. Pro-Am (1988)
- Ivan "Ironman" Stewart's Super Off Road (1989)
- Stadium Mud Buggies (1989 Spiritual Predecessor)
