= Thunder Castle =

1986 video game

- Publisher: INTV Corporation
- Designer: David Warhol
- Platform: Intellivision
- Release: 1986
- Genre: Maze
- Modes: Single-player, multiplayer

Thunder Castle is a maze video game designed for Intellivision by Dave Warhol and published in 1986. The player controls a knight navigating three mazes, defeating enemies to progress. It was going to be published by Mattel Electronics, but the division closed in 1984. It was released in 1986 through mail order by INTV. The game received praise from Computer Entertainer and, retrospectively, Allgame, with Dave Beuscher calling it one of the best games for the Intellivision.

== Gameplay ==
Gameplay of the forest maze

In Thunder Castle, the player controls the knight via the Intellivision direction disc, moving the knight up, down, left and right in the maze. The knight continues in that direction pushed until a turn is possible. The game can be played single-player or two-players alternating. The game is set in three mazes: a forest, a castle and a dungeon. The player guides their knight through these mazes, slaying three dragons in the forest maze, six sorcerers in the castle maze, and nine demons in the dungeon maze. Magical objects are scattered throughout the maze which may help or hinder the knight. After completing the final maze, the game restarts with enemies moving faster. The player can energize their knight for a few seconds by interacting with a bat in the forest, a mouse in the castle or a red skull in the dungeon. Being energized lets the knight slay a monster. Each of the mazes contain gates. Magical creatures can move through the gates, while the knight can not. Scattered throughout the mazes are various magical items which are activated by using any of the action buttons on the Intellivision controller. These items have the ability to freeze monsters for a few seconds, energize the knight, increase his speed, let him move through a gate, or teleport him to a random location in the maze. Collecting the comb item will cut the player's score in half.

The goal is to achieve a high score by slaying the monsters in the maze until all lives are depleted. Death occurs when a monster comes into contact with the knight while he is not energized.

== Development ==
Thunder Castle was developed by David Warhol. It was initially scheduled to be released by Mattel Electronics as Mystic Castle. By October 1983, Mattel Electronics had a $201 million deficit and closed their electronics division in 1984. After Mattel Electronic closed, Warhol formed Warhol Audio Arts specialized in computer game sound effects and music for companies like Electronic Arts and Interplay.

Terrence Valeski, Mattel Electronics senior vice president of marketing felt that as 3 million people had Intellvisions, there was a market and formed the company Intellvision Inc., later changed to INTV. Valeski began marketing new games, which included ones that were finished by a former Mattel Electronics office in France (World Cup Soccer and Championship Tennis) and two previously completed unreleased games World Series Baseball and Thunder Castle.

== Release and reception ==
Thunder Castle was distributed by INTV Corporation predominantly through mail order in 1986.

A review in Computer Entertainer found that nothing was innovative in the game, but "for the first time in a while, the maze lovers among you have something new to add to your library." From retrospective reviews, Dave Beuscher of AllGame wrote in his overview of the system that Thunder Castle was among the best titles for the Intellivision. Jonathan Sutyak from the same publisher gave the game a four out of five-star review, stating it had "some of the best visuals ever seen on the Intellivision" noting nicely drawn characters, detailed backgrounds and fluid movement for the characters. The review concluded that "The action can get tedious when the enemies continually avoid your character, but the game is nevertheless a lot of fun." Mike Bevan wrote in Retro Gamer that "from an aesthetic point of view, this is Intellivision's visual masterpiece." Bevan found that while there were only three stages in the game, "quality rather than quantity sets this title apart."

== Legacy ==
Warhol later re-branded Warhol Audio Arts to Realtime Associates and began making completing old and making new Intellivision games such as ports of Dig Dug and console exclusive games like Hover Force.

Thunder Castle is included in the compilation Intellivision Lives!.

== See also ==
- List of Intellivision games
