= PBA Bowling (1982 video game) =

1982 video game

- Developer: Mattel Electronics
- Publisher: Mattel Electronics
- Platform: Intellivision
- Release: 1982
- Genre: Sports (Bowling)

PBA Bowling is a 1982 bowling sports video game from Mattel Electronics. The game is licensed by the Professional Bowlers Association and supports up to 4 players.

== Gameplay ==
PBA Bowling allows players to customize their approach by choosing among ten ball weights and ten levels of alley slickness, each affecting how the ball curves. It also accounts for whether the bowler is right- or left-handed. Gameplay unfolds across two visual perspectives: an initial side view showcasing the bowler and a portion of the lane, followed by a frontal shot of the pins once the ball is released. Achieving strikes demands precision and skill in curving the ball accurately, while spares can be practiced separately in a dedicated mode called Pick-Up Spares.

== Reception ==
Reception

Review score
Publication	Score
All Game Guide	4/5

All Game Guide gave the game a score of 4 out of 5 stating: "PBA Bowling is a lot of fun if you enjoy the actual sport. Many similarities exist and you have the option of playing pick-up spares if you get tired of the standard game".

Joystik Magazine praised the game's realistic graphics but criticized the lack of challenging gameplay.
