= Royal Dealer =

- Developer: APh Technological Consulting
- Publisher: Mattel Electronics
- Platform: Intellivision
- Release: 1982
- Genre: Digital tabletop
- Mode: Single-player

Royal Dealer (Le Donneur royal in certain versions intended for French-speaking markets) is a video game developed by APh Technological Consulting and published by Mattel Electronics. It was released in 1982 for the Intellivision console..

Royal Dealer is a collection of four card games: Hearts, Rummy, Gin Rummy, and Crazy Eights. The game supports single-player matches against up to three computer-controlled opponents.

== Gameplay ==
The player occupies the front position at the virtual card table, while the opponents are displayed around its upper and side sections. The number of opponents depends on the player's selection before starting a match. The game also includes on-screen instructions explaining the rules and gameplay of each card game.
