= Entertainment Computer System =

Add-on peripheral for the Intellivision

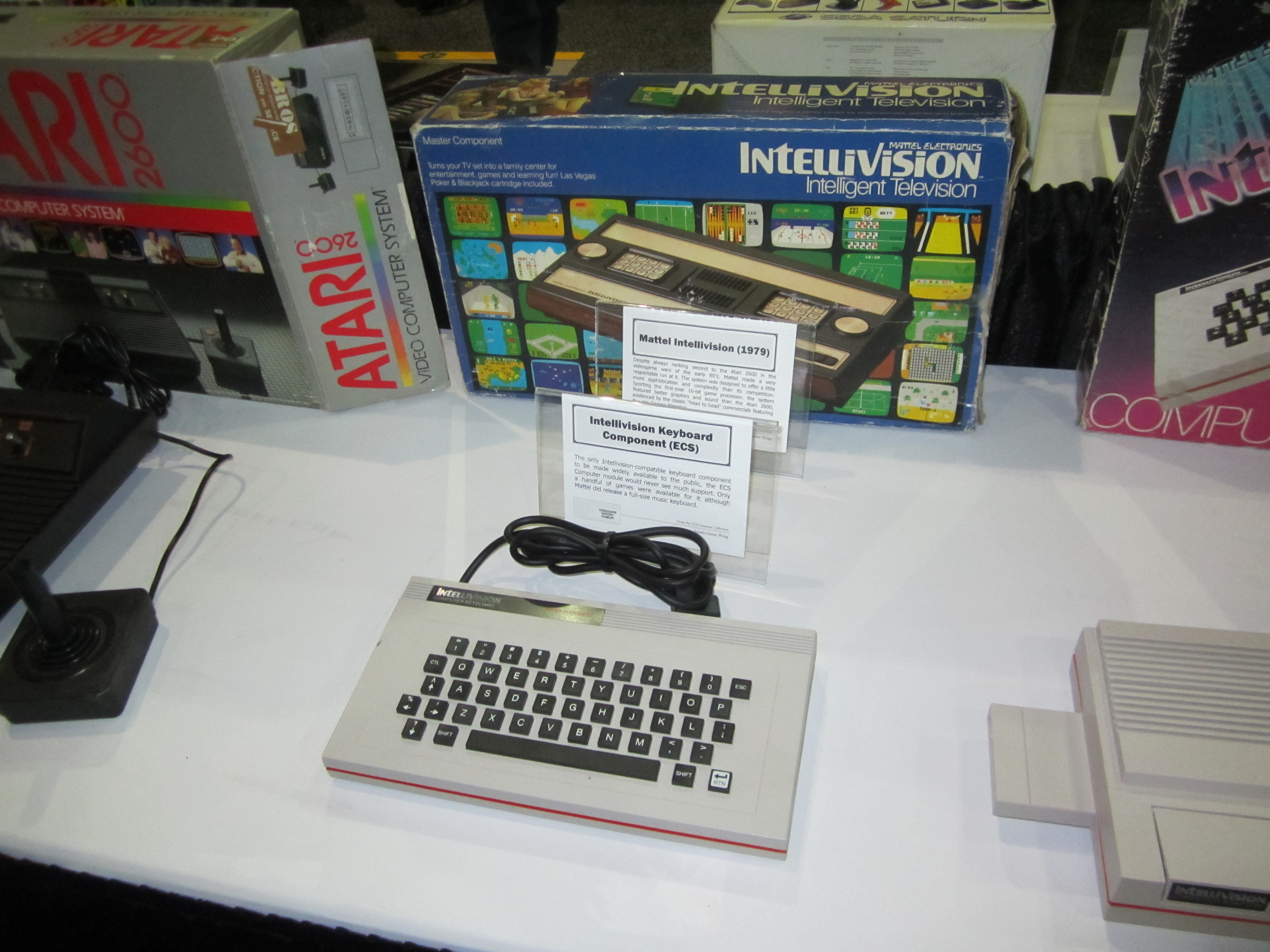
The ECS For Intellivision

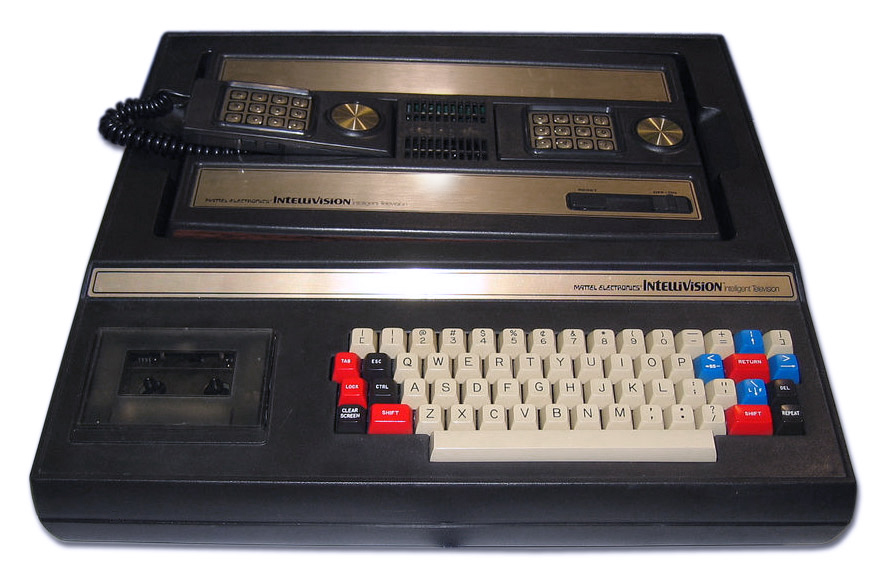
The Former Intelliputer/Blue Whale/Keyboard Component

The Entertainment Computer System (ECS) is an add-on peripheral released for the Intellivision video game console in 1983. It was Mattel Electronics' second attempt at creating a peripheral to upgrade the Intellivision into a home computer, and was rushed into production to appease the Federal Trade Commission after they began fining Mattel for false advertising following consumer complaints about the repeated delays in releasing the originally planned Intellivision Keyboard Component add-on. The ECS includes the Computer Module, Music Synthesizer, and additional hand controllers; each sold separately. Any Intellivision Master Component is compatible and a requirement to use the system. A second requirement is a cartridge plugged into the ECS, although any ECS or Intellivision cartridge will do; pressing anything on the Intellivision hand controllers will then bring up the three-option menu of BASIC, CARTRIDGE or MUSIC.

== History ==
When Mattel Electronics originally released the Intellivision in late 1979, they advertised that the Intellivision — unlike its primary rival, the Atari 2600 (then known as the Atari VCS) — would be upgradeable to a fully functional home computer via a hardware add-on accessory called the Keyboard Component, internally sometimes called the "Blue Whale" or the "Intelliputer". Many potential buyers were excited by the notion (especially parents, who liked the idea of a machine that could be turned into an educational tool, or at least something more useful and practical than just a game-playing system), and many bought Intellivisions on that basis alone.

The planned Keyboard Component would have offered a 16kB of RAM (expandable to an unprecedented 8 megabytes), built-in cassette storage for programs and data (plus a simultaneous audio track that could be played under computer control), an optional 40-column thermal printer, and a secondary CPU to run all of these expanded features independently of the Intellivision's CP1610 processor. While the planned Keyboard Component was an ambitious design, it had reliability problems that proved difficult to overcome, and it was far too expensive to manufacture and sell. The Keyboard Component — originally planned for a 1981 release — was continually delayed and pushed back as Mattel's engineering group, headed by David "Papa Intellivision" Chandler, kept going back to the drawing board trying to find ways to overcome these problems.

Eventually, complaints from Intellivision owners who had chosen to buy the Intellivision specifically on the promise of a "Coming Soon!" personal-computer upgrade caught the attention of the Federal Trade Commission (FTC), which launched an investigation of Mattel Electronics for fraud and false advertising. Mattel tried to claim that the Keyboard Component was a real product that was still being test-marketed, and even released a small number of Keyboard Components and a handful of software titles to a few select retail stores (as well as offering them via mail-order to any customers who complained loudly enough) in order to support this claim.

Mattel Electronics already had a "plan B" in progress. Increasingly concerned that the Keyboard Component division might never actually produce a sellable product, in mid-1981, Mattel Electronics' management set up a competing internal engineering team headed by Richard Chang. Ostensibly, this group was working on a low-cost add-on called the BASIC Development System, or BDS, which would be sold as an educational device to introduce kids to the concepts of computer programming via a simplified color-coded BASIC interpreter and an inexpensive keyboard. Only a few people within Mattel knew the team's real mission: to either fix the Keyboard Component, or replace it.

Chang's "Design & Development" group (who had to keep the project's real purpose a closely guarded secret among themselves, fearing that if Chandler found out about it he would use his influence at Mattel, Inc. to get the project killed) eventually came up with an alternative to the Keyboard Component. Originally dubbed the LUCKI (from "Low User-Cost Keyboard Interface"), it lacked many of the sophisticated features envisioned for the original Keyboard Component: instead of a full 16kB of RAM, it only offered a mere 2kB (not all of which was actually available to the user); the cassette interface was stripped down to the bare essential needed to save and load data (and was now an optional extra, rather than built-in), and there was no secondary CPU. Still, it fulfilled the original promises—turn the Intellivision into a computer, make it possible to write programs and store them to tape, and interface with a printer—well enough to allow Mattel to claim that they had delivered the promised computer upgrade and, it was hoped, to get the FTC off Mattel's back.

On the plus side, the ECS did include a built-in BASIC that was somewhat functional, if idiosyncratic and occasionally buggy, and a second AY-3-8910 sound chip which expanded the system's audio capabilities to six-voice synthesized sound and, when paired with the optional 49-key Music Synthesizer keyboard, could potentially turn the Intellivision into a polyphonic synthesizer for playing, recording, or learning music. It would also allow two additional hand-held Game Controllers to be connected in place of the alphanumeric keyboard, which opened up the possibility of four-player games.

In the fall of 1982, the LUCKI—now renamed the Entertainment Computer System, or ECS—was presented at the annual sales meeting, officially signaling the end of the ill-fated Keyboard Component project. (Although it didn't go quietly. Not only did Mattel have to agree to buy back all of the existing keyboard components, but Compro, Inc., the manufacturer which had been contracted to make the keyboards, promptly sued Mattel for $10 million, claiming breach of contract, fraud, and nonpayment for the last 1,300 units. At least a number were modified (and dubbed internally "Black Whales") to use as part of development systems for creation of Intellivision software.) A new advertising campaign was hastily rushed onto the air in time for the 1982 Christmas season, promising once again that a home-computer upgrade was just around the corner, and the ECS itself was shown to the public at the January 1983 Consumer Electronic Show (CES) in Las Vegas. A few months later, the ECS hit the market, and the FTC agreed to drop the $10K/day fines.

By the time the ECS made its retail debut, an internal shake-up at the top levels of Mattel Electronics' management had caused the company's focus to shift away from hardware add-ons in favor of software, and the ECS received very little further marketing push. Further hardware developments, including a planned Program Expander that would have added another 16kB of RAM and a more sophisticated, fully featured Extended-BASIC to the system, were halted, and in the end only a half-dozen titles were released for the ECS.

== Hardware ==
- ECS EXEC/BASIC ROM, containing the built-in BASIC programming language and additional BIOS routines to handle the added hardware features (12K)
- additional 2kB of system RAM, of which about 1.5K is available for BASIC programming (the system could supposedly be further expanded to as much as 64kB with add-on memory modules, but no such modules ever made it to production)
- AY-3-8917 sound chip (similar to the sound chip used in the Intellivision), doubling the system's audio and controller capability
- an audio tape recorder interface with two 3.5mm mono jacks and one 2.5mm jack for optional tape control. It is compatible with the Aquarius Data Recorder, but requires a different cable than the Aquarius, and is also compatible with most cassette recorders with MIC, EAR and REM jacks.
- auxiliary jack for a serial printer connection (Aquarius compatible), 3.5mm stereo jack that is RS-232C compatible, where tip is data transmit, ring is DSR/DCD, sleeve is ground, 1200 baud, 8 data bits, 2 stop bits, and no parity
- two DE-9 ports for the alphanumeric Computer Keyboard, the Music Synthesizer keyboard, or two additional Intellivision Game Controllers

== What was included ==
- Computer Adaptor add-on module (plugged into the Intellivision)
- alphanumeric 49 key Computer Keyboard
- AC adapter, Input 120 V, 60 Hz, 17 VA; Output 10 VAC, 1.0 amp. The connector is a size larger than the Intellivision II connector.
- spiral-bound "Computer Module Owner's Guide", including a language reference for the built-in BASIC

== Optional add-ons ==
- "Step-By-Step Guide to Home Computing" programming guide (available via mail order)
- Music Synthesizer 49-key music keyboard
- extra Intellivision game controllers (for 4-player games)
- data cassette drive
- 40-column thermal printer

(Note: the latter two options were never actually marketed with Intellivision/ECS boxes and logos. The system would use the same cassette and printer units which were being sold for the Aquarius, but this fact seems to have not been widely advertised by Mattel.)

== Games ==
Initially, at least a half-dozen ECS-supporting software titles were slated to roll out along with the ECS, with more to follow. Unfortunately, as noted above, by the time the ECS made its retail debut in 1983 a new management team had taken over at Mattel Electronics which was no longer interested in selling or promoting hardware add-ons, which they viewed as money-losers that had tied up too much of the company's capital for too little return. (Perhaps not without some justification, given the history of the long-delayed, never-released Keyboard Component and the lower-than-expected sales of the Intellivoice module.) The Marketing and Applications departments were also not particularly enthusiastic about the ECS unit, since it really didn't add any revolutionary features to the system and it was a struggle to come up with game ideas that would justify requiring the user to have one.

As a result, the ECS was not well-promoted, and few of the planned software titles were released before Richard Chang's "Design & Development" group was closed down in August 1983, effectively halting further work on ECS-supporting titles. A very few titles that were already well in progress were eventually completed, but none of them made it to production before Mattel Electronics ceased operations in January 1984.

=== Released titles ===
- The Jetsons' Ways With Words, a/k/a Jetsons' Word Fun (educational title)
- Melody Blaster (Music Synthesizer game title)
- Mind Strike (strategy game title)
- Mr. BASIC Meets Bits 'N Bytes (educational game title)
- Scooby Doo's Maze Chase (strategy / maze game title)
- World Series Major League Baseball (sports title)

Melody Blaster was the only title ever released for the Music Synthesizer add-on unit.

Mr. BASIC Meets Bits 'N Bytes plays without the ECS Computer Module with BASIC commands support disabled.

=== Unreleased titles ===
- BASIC Programmer (educational/productivity title, unfinished)
- Doubles Tennis (4-player sports title, unfinished)
- Flintstones Keyboard Fun (educational title, completed but unreleased)
- Game Factory (educational/productivity title, completed but unreleased)
- Melody Maker (Music Synthesizer title, unfinished)
- Music Conductor (Music Synthesizer title, unfinished)
- Number Jumble (educational title, completed but unreleased)
- Super NFL Football (sports title, completed but unreleased)
- Super NASL Soccer (4-player sports title, completed but unreleased)

Number Jumble plays without the Computer Module.

Super NASL Soccer was eventually released as World Cup Soccer by Mattel Electronics' French division, which reformed under the name Nice Ideas when Mattel Electronics was shut down. World Cup Soccer was sold as a standard Intellivision cartridge but does support ECS 4-player with the Computer Adaptor and extra game controllers.

== Keywords in ECS BASIC ==
The BASIC keywords built into the ECS, discussed at length in the manual, are a maximum of four characters long. Some ECS BASIC keywords are simply a truncation or abbreviation of the standard BASIC terms, e.g. "print" becomes PRIN, "input" becomes INPU, and "gosub" becomes GSUB. The ECS will display help menus covering its commands: type MENU 0 for monitor commands, MENU 1 for BASIC keywords, MENU 2 for BASIC functions, and MENU 3 for BASIC routines.

Eight sprites at a time may be SHOWn or GRABbed from a storehouse of such images in each individual Intellivision cartridge, and such sprites can then be manipulated by changing their colors (1 color available per sprite), doubling their height or width, flipping their shape to a mirror image, creating motion sequences, and so forth. However, the sprites are only "borrowed" and cannot be integrated into the user's own program unless the same cartridge is on board when the program is run.

== Video ==
In BASIC mode, the display on the ECS is 20 columns across (while the maximum program line length is 39 characters), and any text is shown in all capital letters. The normal text color is black against a green background. Color codes are used by the ECS to mark different elements of a program as each line is entered or (in immediate mode) executed. The color-coding scheme, which is explained in the back of the manual or can be discerned from direct observation, is useful in determining how the ECS understood (or misunderstood) any command. As to graphics, the background screen is composed of 240 "cards" (20 wide by 12 high, numbered 0 to 239, each composed of 8x8 pixels), in a choice of one of 16 colors (eight primary and eight pastel). Eight sprites at a time may be SHOWn or GRABbed from a storehouse of such images in each individual Intellivision cartridge, and such sprites can then be manipulated by changing their colors (1 color available per sprite), doubling their height or width, flipping their shape to a mirror image, creating motion sequences, and so forth. However, the sprites are only "borrowed" and cannot be integrated into the user's own program unless the same cartridge is on board when the program is run. (Professional programmers found ways to create the illusion of putting more than eight sprites on the Intellivision screen at the same time through multiplexing-- redefining and repositioning a single object from one frame to the next and back again, resulting in flickering images of two objects-- and sequencing graphics RAM to animate background cards.)

== Interfacing ==
For 600-baud cassette tape recorder access to load and save programs, the ECS has jacks marked OUT TO TAPE, IN FROM TAPE, and REMOTE. While almost any recorder with similar ports can be used, Mattel marketed the Aquarius Data Recorder for use with the ECS, and that unit has the appropriate sockets (labeled MIC, EAR and REM). To attach to the ECS, three straight-through cables are needed, two with mini-plugs on both ends and one with sub-mini-plugs on both ends (for the REMOTE connection). Tape access on the ECS is supported by BASIC keywords for loading (CLOD), saving (CSAV) and verifying (CVRF). The Intellivision hand controllers are pressed to advance through the SET-GO-SAVE/LOAD/VERF sequence. While programs can be saved and accessed without file names, file names up to four characters long (e.g., CSAV PROG) are supported (quote marks are not used around the file names), and the computer will search for the named program to load or verify.

The printer interface, being the AUX jack, is the same as on the Aquarius: a mini-stereo socket with just 3 lines. The Aquarius printers could be used with the ECS, and came with their own cables. However, the ECS like the Aquarius used standard RS-232C serial signals (±12VDC), so it was possible to interface many RS-232C serial printers. The ECS/Aquarius used a 1200 baud rate, 8 data bits, 2 stop bits, and no parity; the printer needed to be set to these selections with no line feed (sometimes called "carriage return only", "CR", "new line invalid", or "line feed inhibit"), and Busy/Ready instead of X-on/X-off. Typical serial printers had DB-25 interfaces; some had DE-9 interfaces; and, some Radio Shack (RS) printers had round 4-pin female DIN connector serial interfaces (with the pin sockets numbered left-to-right: 4, 3, 2, 1). The proper cable for connecting such a printer is as follows:

MINI-STEREO PLUG      DB-25    DE-9     RS       FUNCTION

Tip/Center of Plug    Pin 3    Pin 2    Pin 4    Data to Printer
Middle of Plug        Pin 20   Pin 4    Pin 2    Printer Busy/Ready 
Base/Outside          Pin 7    Pin 5    Pin 3    Signal Ground

To access the printer, the command sequence is:

D=-1
CALL OUTP

and to cancel the access:

D=1
CALL OUTP[2]
