= Snafu (video game) =

1981 video game

- Intellivision box art
- Developer: Mattel Electronics
- Publisher: Mattel Electronics
- Designer: Mike Minkoff
- Composer: Russell Lieblich
- Platforms: Intellivision, Aquarius
- Release: Intellivision: October 15, 1981; Aquarius: 1983
- Genre: Snake
- Modes: Single player, multiplayer

Snafu is a video game released by Mattel for its Intellivision system in 1981. One of a number of snake games released in the late 1970s and early 1980s, Snafu has players controlling ever-lengthening serpents as they attempt to corner their opponents and trap them.

A version of Snafu was released for Mattel's short-lived Aquarius personal computer in 1983.

== Gameplay ==
Snafu contains 16 different game variations based around two game formats, "Trap" (12 variations) and "Bite" (4 variations). Before gameplay begins, players select the speed of the game, then the desired gameplay variation and finally the number of rounds (up to 99) for that game.

"Trap" games may be played by either one or two players; if a controller is not used, the computer assumes control of that player's character. When the round starts, colored serpents appear on the screen inside a rectangular playfield and begin to grow. The object is to box in the opponents' serpents, forcing them to collide with the edges of the playfield or with another serpent, including itself. Players may move horizontally or vertically, although some variations allow diagonal movement. There also may be additional obstacles on the screen and/or two extra computer-controlled lines (for a total of four lines on-screen at once), again depending on the gameplay variation selected. Points are scored by the surviving player(s) whenever an opponent line crashes.

"Bite" games are played by two players, with no computer-controlled opponents. At the start of the round, each serpent grows until it reaches a set length. Players must direct their serpents toward the tail of their opponent. Each time the head of a serpent contacts the tail of the opponent, the opponent serpent loses a segment. Segments are also lost if the serpent collides with the edges of the playfield or with an obstacle. After a period of time, serpents can regrow segments up to a maximum of double the original length. When a player's serpent loses all its segments, the surviving serpent wins the round.

== Development ==
Programmer Mike Minkoff began work on the game under the working title Blockade+Snakes, which was based on the inspirations of the two game variations, the board game Blockade and a prototype handheld game developed by Mattel Electronics but never released. As development continued, Minkoff began calling the game Ssssnakes!, to the point of including the name on the game's start-up screen. However, Mattel had decided to name the game after the military acronym SNAFU, even though Minkoff believed there was no connection between the game and the acronym's meaning.

== Reviews ==
- Games #44

== Legacy ==
Snafu was re-released as part of the Intellivision Lives! collection.
