= Intellivision =

Home video game console

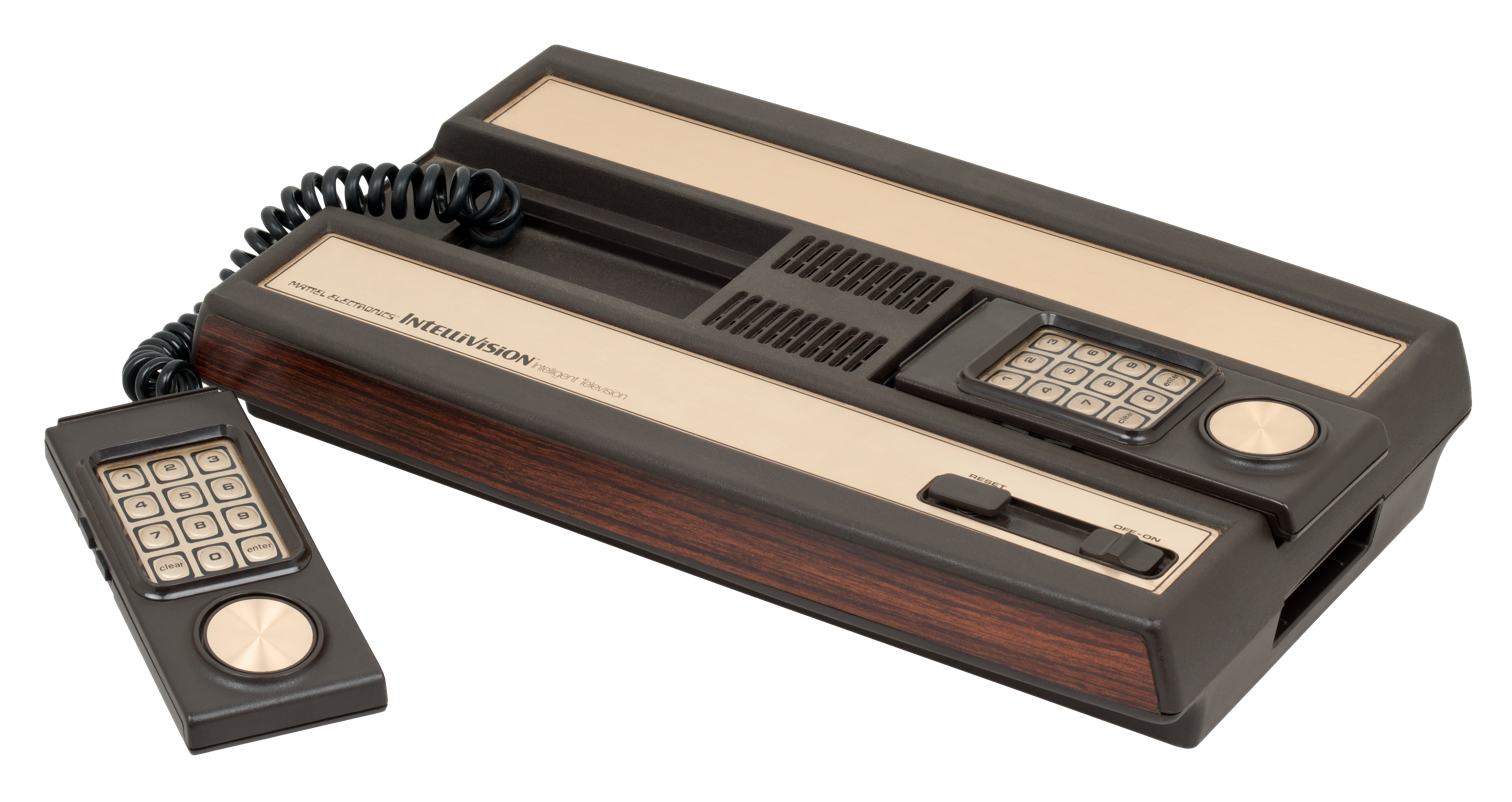
- First model Intellivision (1979)
- Manufacturer: Mattel Electronics (1979–1984); INTV Corporation (1984–1990)
- Type: Home video game console
- Generation: Second
- Released: NA: 1979; UK: 1980/81; ZA: 1982; DE: 1982; FRA: 1982; JP: 1982; BR: 1983
- Lifespan: 1979—1990
- Introductory price: US$275 1,220; CA$385; £199; DM499; ₣2000; ¥49,800
- Discontinued: 1990
- Units sold: > 3.75 million (1980–83)
- Media: ROM cartridge
- CPU: GI CP1610
- Memory: 1K RAM, 6K ROM
- Display: Standard TV, 159×96 resolution, 16 color palette
- Graphics: Standard Television Interface Chip (STIC)
- Sound: GI AY-3-8914 (three-channels, one noise generator)
- Online services: PlayCable
- Best-selling game: Las Vegas Poker & Blackjack 1.939 million; Major League Baseball 1.085 million (as of June 1983)

The Intellivision (a portmanteau of "intelligent television") is a home video game console released by Mattel Electronics in 1979. It distinguished itself from competitors with more realistic sports and strategic games. By 1981, Mattel Electronics had close to 20% of the domestic video game market, selling more than 3.75 million consoles and 20 million cartridges through 1983. At its peak, Mattel Electronics had about 1,800 employees in several countries, including 110 videogame developers. In 1984, Mattel sold its video game assets to a former Mattel Electronics executive and investors, eventually becoming INTV Corporation. Game development ran from 1978 to 1990, when the Intellivision was discontinued.

In 2009, IGN ranked the Intellivision No. 14 on their list of the greatest video game consoles of all time. There have been a number of followup consoles released with Intellivision branding, including the Intellivison Flashback from AtGames, the Intellivision Amico by Intellivision Entertainment, and the Intellivision Sprint by Atari, Inc. who own the Intellivision brand and library as of 2024.

== History ==
The Intellivision was developed at Mattel in Hawthorne, California. By 1969, multiple research and development groups came together as the Preliminary Design department on the third floor of the head office. Mattel had a history with technology R&D as design engineer Jack Ryan, who joined the company in 1955 from Raytheon, led a group of engineers, chemists, and sculptors. With a large budget they were expected to be forward thinking, dubbed the blue-sky group.

=== Early design concepts ===
In 1975, mechanical engineer Richard Chang, a director under Ryan, contacted MOS Technology for a demonstration of their new 6502 microprocessor in a video game application. MOS arranged for their client Glenn Hightower of APh Technological Consulting and teacher at CalTech University to do the demonstration.

Shortly after, Dave James, an industrial engineer under Chang, wrote a memo dated January 26, 1976, documenting two product concepts. First, a microprocessor programmed video system with "plug-in" ROM modules or cassettes, and a list of applications that include war games, gambling games, strategy and board games, video Etch-a-Sketch, driving simulator, pinball; and football with 10 player a side, defense/offense patterns and floating field background. Second, calculator based games. With Mattel executives skeptical, Chang's group moved forward with handheld electronic games enlisting Hightower's help with a prototype.

Mattel hired Michael Katz as Marketing Manager for New Product Categories. In 1975, Katz asked Chang to prototype a calculator-sized electronic game for 1976. In Fall 1976, Mattel hired Ed Krakauer as Vice President of New Business Development, who hired Jeff Rochlis as Director of New Business Development. In an October 1977 newspaper article, Rochlis was quoted saying, "Basically these things are fore-runners of the home computer. There's a logical transition involved. One way to get into the home-computer market is to sell games."

=== Choosing a platform ===
In April 1977, David Chandler, with a doctoral degree in Electrical Engineering, a career in Aerospace, also having prototyped an early word processor as well as an arcade video game, joined Preliminary Design under Chang. Chandler shared Chang's vision for a video game system with rich graphics and long-lasting gameplay to distinguish itself from its competitors and took over responsibility for its engineering. Prior to Chandler's arrival, Chang's group had already met with National Semiconductor about their new video display controller that would be paired with an Intel 8080 CPU. Chandler negotiated better pricing for a simpler design. At the Consumer Electronics Show in June 1977, Chandler saw two more video driver chipsets. One from MOS Technology lacked moving objects (sprites) which would make it difficult to program sports games. The other from General Instrument (GI), listed as the Gimini programmable set in the GI 1977 catalog. The GI chipset lacked programmable graphics and Mattel worked with GI to implement changes. GI published an updated chipset in its 1978 catalog. Mattel initially chose National Semiconductor, who wanted to postpone the project, forcing Mattel to turn to GI. Mattel corporate management reacted by putting a halt to video game development for several months. On November 9, 1977, Mattel, GI, and Magnavox (their initial contract manufacturer) met to plan contracts and production.

Around this same time, the previous slow sales of Mattel Electronics branded handheld electronic games reversed and began to be a hit product. Management responded by spinning off the designs to the newly formed Mattel Electronics division, with separate marketing, finance, and engineering. In September, Krakauer made Rochlis its president. Chang became director of its new Design and Development department, responsible for Intellivision software. Chandler became director of Product Engineering and lead a team engineering the hardware, including the hand controllers. In 1978, David Rolfe of APh developed the onboard executive control software named Exec, and with a group of Caltech summer student employees programmed the first Intellivision games. Hal Finney of APh contributed sound and music processing routines to the Exec. Graphics were designed by a group of artists at Mattel led by Dave James. James also creating detailed game proposal documents.

During June 1978 CES, Mattel privately showed a prototype to retailers, leading to a Christmas release. Delays at GI pushed that into 1979. Magnavox backed out as manufacturer, replaced with Sylvania. Chandler considered replacing the GI chipset and working with Texas Instruments and their new TMS9918 video processor. The TI chip had more moving objects but half the number on a horizontal line compared with the GI STIC; it also lacked hardware scrolling that the GI STIC provides. Further, the TI chip requires more RAM and software already developed would have to be reworked.

=== Master Component ===
The Intellivision was introduced at the 1979 Las Vegas CES in January as a modular home computer with the Master Component priced at US$165 and a soon-to-follow Keyboard Component also at $165 (equivalent to $730 in 2025). At Chicago CES in June, prices were revised to $250 for each component. A shortage of key chips from manufacturer General Instrument resulted in a limited number of Intellivision Master Components produced that year. In Fall 1979, Sylvania marketed its own branded Intellivision at $280 in its GTE stores at Philadelphia, Baltimore, and Washington, D.C. On December 3, Mattel delivered consoles to the Gottschalks department store chain headquartered in Fresno, California, with a suggested list price of $275. The Intellivision was also listed in the nationally distributed JCPenney Christmas 1979 catalog along with seven cartridges. By April 1980, markets expanded to Los Angeles, New York, and Chicago. It was in stores nationwide by mid-1980 with the pack-in game Las Vegas Poker & Blackjack and a library of ten cartridges.

By September 1980, there was internal debate about the effectiveness of marketing the Intellivision as a home computer and the direction of Mattel Electronics was questioned. Krakauer and Rochlis resigned, and Josh Denham became the new president of Mattel Electronics. The Keyboard Component was no longer promoted in advertising. A series of advertisements starring George Plimpton used side-by-side game comparisons to demonstrate the superior graphics and sound of Intellivision over the Atari 2600. One slogan called Intellivision "the closest thing to the real thing". One such example compared golf games; where the 2600's games had a blip sound and cruder graphics, the Intellivision featured a realistic swing sound and striking of the ball and a more 3D look. In 1980, Mattel sold out its 190,000 stock of Intellivision Master Components, along with one million cartridges. In 1981, more than one million Intellivision consoles were sold, more than five times the amount of the previous year. Mattel Electronics became a subsidiary and relocated to another building to accommodate their growth. In 1982, they sold 1.8 million Intellivisions.

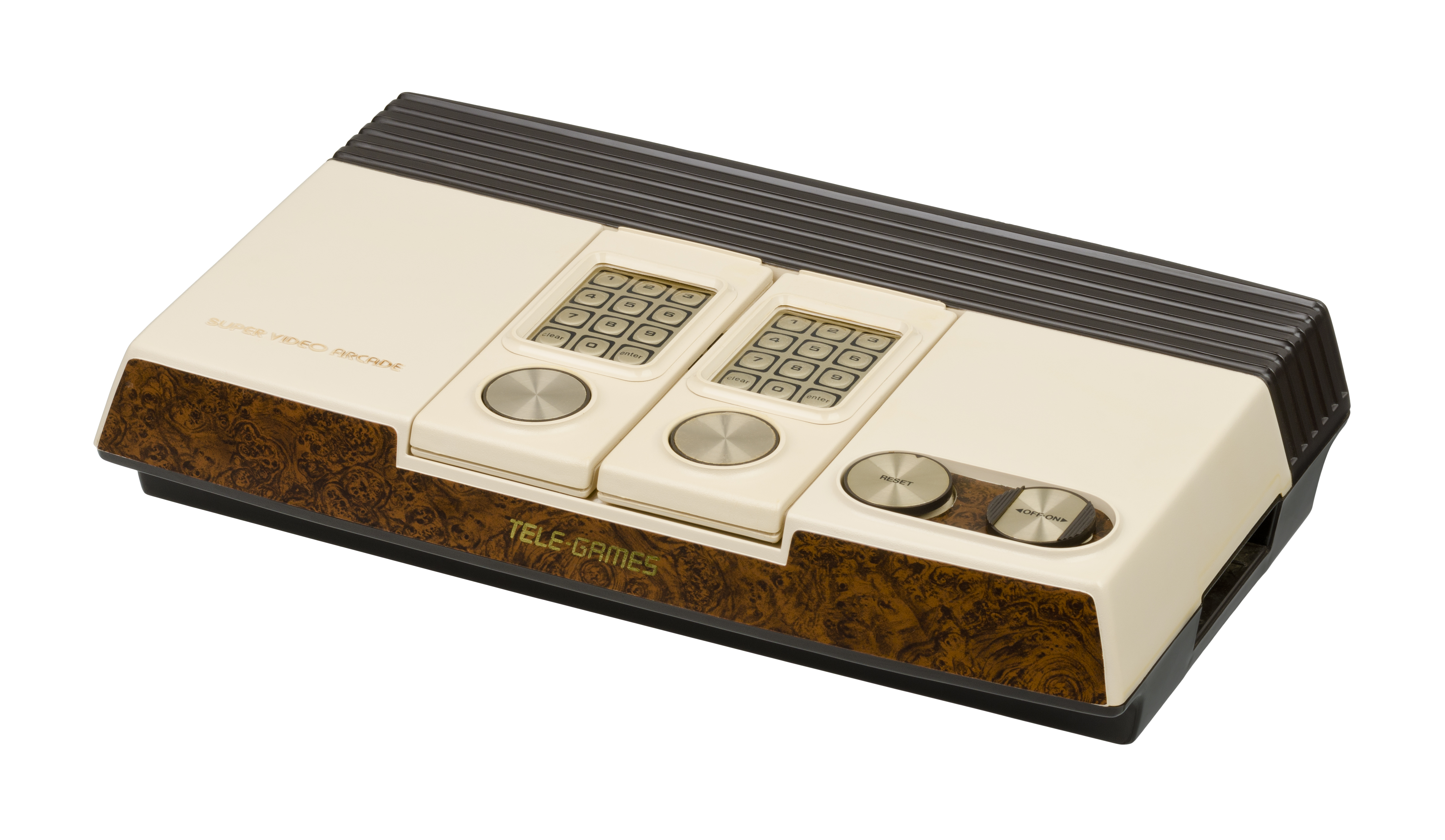
Super Video Arcade

The Intellivision Master Component was branded and distributed by various companies. Before Mattel shifted manufacturing to Hong Kong, Mattel Intellivision consoles were manufactured by GTE Sylvania. GTE Sylvania Intellivision consoles were produced along with Mattel's, differing only by the brand name. The Sears Super Video Arcade, manufactured by Mattel in Hong Kong, has a restyled beige top cover and detachable controllers. Its default title screen lacks the "Mattel Electronics" captioning. In 1982, Radio Shack marketed the Tandyvision One, similar to the original console but with the gold plates replaced with more wood trim. In Japan, Intellivision consoles were branded for Bandai in 1982, and in Brazil there were Digimed and Digiplay consoles manufactured by Sharp in 1983.

=== Software ===
Inside every Intellivision console is 4K of ROM containing the Exec software. It provides two benefits: reusable code that can effectively make a 4K cartridge an 8K game and a software framework for new programmers to develop games more easily and quickly. It also allows other programmers to more easily review and continue another's project. Under the supervision of David Rolfe at APh, and with graphics from Mattel artist Dave James, APh was able to quickly create the Intellivision launch game library using mostly summer students. The drawback is that to be flexible and handle many different types of games, the Exec runs less efficiently than a dedicated program. Intellivision games that leverage the Exec run at a 20 Hz frame rate instead of the 60 Hz frame rate for which the Intellivision was designed. Using the Exec framework is optional, but almost all Intellivision games released by Mattel Electronics use it and thus run at 20 Hz. The limited ROM space in the early years of Intellivision game releases also means there is no space for a computer player, so many early multiplayer games require two human players.

Initially, all Intellivision games were programmed by an outside firm, APh Technological Consulting, with 19 cartridges produced before Christmas 1980. Once the Intellivision project became successful, software development was brought in-house. Mattel formed its own software development group and began hiring programmers. The original five members of that Intellivision team were Mike Minkoff, Rick Levine, John Sohl, Don Daglow, and manager Gabriel Baum. Levine and Minkoff, a long-time Mattel Toys veteran, both transferred from the hand-held Mattel game engineering team. During 1981, Mattel hired programmers as fast as possible. Early in 1982 Mattel Electronics relocated from Mattel headquarters to an unused industrial building. Offices were renovated as new staff moved in. To keep these programmers from being hired away by rival Atari, their identities and work location was kept a closely guarded secret. In public, the programmers were referred to collectively as the Blue Sky Rangers.

Most of the early games are based on traditional real-world concepts such as sports, with an emphasis on realism and depth of play within the technology of the time. The Intellivision was not marketed as a toy; as such, games such as Sea Battle and B-17 Bomber are not made in the pick-up-and-play format like arcade games. Reading the instructions is often a prerequisite. Every cartridge produced by Mattel Electronics includes two plastic controller overlays to help navigate the 12-button keypad, although not every game uses it. Game series, or networks, are Major League Sports, Action, Strategy, Gaming, Children's Learning, and later Space Action and Arcade. The network concept was dropped in 1983, as was the convenient gatefold-style box for storing the cartridge, instructions, and overlays.

Starting in 1981, programmers looking for credit and royalties on sales began leaving both APh and Mattel Electronics to create Intellivision cartridges for third-party publishers. They helped form Imagic in 1981, and in 1982 others joined Activision and Atari. Cheshire Engineering was formed by a few senior APh programmers including David Rolfe, author of the Exec, and Tom Loughry, creator of one of the most popular Intellivision games, Advanced Dungeons and Dragons. Cheshire created Intellivision games for Activision. Third-party developers Activision, Imagic, and Coleco started producing Intellivision cartridges in 1982, and Atari, Parker Brothers, Sega, and Interphase followed in 1983. The third-party developers, not having legal access to Exec knowledge, often bypassed the Exec framework to create smooth 30 Hz and 60 Hz Intellivision games such as The Dreadnaught Factor. Cheaper ROM prices also allowed for progressively larger games as 8K, 12K, and 16K cartridges became common. The first Mattel Electronics Intellivision game to run at 60 Hz was Masters of the Universe in 1983. Marketing dubbed the term "Super Graphics" on the game's packaging and marketing.

Mattel Electronics had a competitive advantage in its team of experienced and talented programmers. As competitors often depended on licensing well known trademarks to sell video games, Mattel focused on original ideas. Don Daglow was a key early programmer at Mattel and became director of Intellivision game development. Daglow created Utopia, a precursor to the sim genre and, with Eddie Dombrower, the ground-breaking sports simulation World Series Major League Baseball. Daglow was also involved with the popular Intellivision games Tron Deadly Discs and Shark! Shark!. After Mattel Electronics closed in 1984, its programmers continued to make significant contributions to the videogame industry. Don Daglow and Eddie Dombrower went on to Electronic Arts to create Earl Weaver Baseball, and Don Daglow founded Stormfront Studios. Bill Fisher, Steve Roney, and Mike Breen founded Quicksilver Software, and David Warhol founded Realtime Associates.

=== Keyboard Component ===
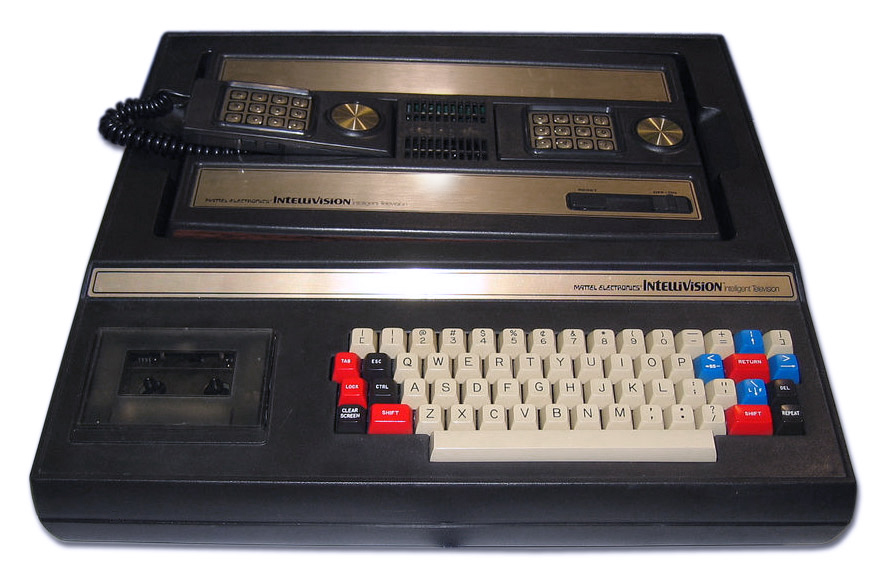
The Keyboard Component was code-named the Blue Whale, also known as the Intelliputer.

The Intellivision was designed as a modular home computer; so, from the beginning, its packaging, promotional materials, and television commercials promised the addition of a forthcoming accessory called the Keyboard Component. The Master Component was packaged as a stand-alone video game system to which the Keyboard Component could be added, providing the computer keyboard and tape drive. Not meant to be a hobbyist or business computer, the Intellivision home computer was meant to run pre-programmed software and bring "data flow" (Videotex) into the home.

The Keyboard Component adds an 8-bit 6502 processor, making the Intellivision a dual-processor computer. It has 16K 10-bit shared RAM that can load and execute both Intellivision CP1610 and 6502 program code from tape, which is a large amount as typical contemporary cartridges are 4K. The cassettes have two tracks of digital data and two tracks of analog audio, completely controlled by the computer. Two tracks are read-only for the software, and two tracks are for user data. The tape drive is block addressed with high speed indexing. A high resolution 40×24 monochrome text display can overlay regular Intellivision graphics. There is a microphone port and two expansion ports for peripherals and RAM. The Microsoft BASIC programming cartridge uses one of these ports. Expanded memory cartridges support 1,000 pages of 8 KB each. A third pass-through cartridge port is for regular Intellivision cartridges. It uses the Intellivision's power supply.

David Rolfe of APh wrote a control program for the Keyboard Component called PicSe (Picture Sequencer) specifically for the development of multimedia applications. PicSe synchronizes the graphics and analog audio while concurrently saving or loading tape data. Productivity software for home finances, personal improvement, and self education were planned. Subject experts were consulted and their voices recorded and used in the software. Only two applications using the PicSe system were released on cassette tape: Conversational French and Jack Lalanne's Physical Conditioning. Cassettes in development include Super Football, Spelling Challenge, Chartcraft Stock Analysis, and Jeanne Dixon Astrology.

Programs written in BASIC do not have access to Intellivision graphics and were sold at a lower price. Five BASIC applications were released on tape: Family Budgeting, Geography Challenge, and Crosswords I, II, and III.

The Keyboard Component was an ambitious piece of engineering for its time, and it was repeatedly delayed as engineers tried to reduce manufacturing costs. In August 1979, a breadboard form of the Component was successfully entered into the Sears Market Research Program. In December 1979, Mattel had production design working units but decided on a significant internal design change to consolidate circuit boards. In September 1980, it was test marketed in Fresno, California, but without software, except for the BASIC programming cartridge. In late 1981, design changes were finally implemented and the Keyboard Component was released at $600 (equivalent to $2,120 in 2025) in Seattle and New Orleans only. Customers who complained in writing could buy a Keyboard Component directly from Mattel. The printer, a rebadged Alphacom Sprinter 40, was only available by mail order.

The Keyboard Component's repeated delays became so notorious around Mattel headquarters that comedian Jay Leno, when performing at Mattel's 1981 Christmas party, got his biggest response of the evening with the line: "You know what the three big lies are, don't you? 'The check is in the mail', 'I'll still respect you in the morning', and 'The keyboard will be out in spring.'"

Complaints from consumers who had chosen to buy the Intellivision specifically on the promise of a "coming soon" personal-computer upgrade eventually caught the attention of the Federal Trade Commission (FTC), who started investigating Mattel Electronics for fraud and false advertising. Mattel explained to the FTC that the Keyboard Component was a failed product, avoiding fines. Mattel subsequently cancelled the product in August 1982, and offered to buy back all of the existing Keyboard Components from customers. Mattel provided a full refund, but customers without a receipt received $550 for the Keyboard Component, $60 for the BASIC cartridge, and $30 for each cassette software. Any customer who opted to keep the products was required to sign a waiver with the understanding that no more software would be written for the system and absolving Mattel of any future responsibility for technical support. They were also compensated with $1,000 worth of Mattel Electronics products.

Though approximately 4,000 Keyboard Components were manufactured, it is not clear how many of them were sold and they are rare. Many of the units were dismantled for parts. Others were used by Mattel Electronics programmers as part of their development system. A Keyboard Component could be interfaced with an Intellivision development system in place of the hand-built Magus board RAM cartridge. Data transfer to the Keyboard Component RAM is done serially and is slower than the Magus board parallel interface.

The keyboard component debacle was ranked as No. 11 on GameSpy's "25 dumbest moments in gaming".

=== Entertainment Computer System (ECS) ===
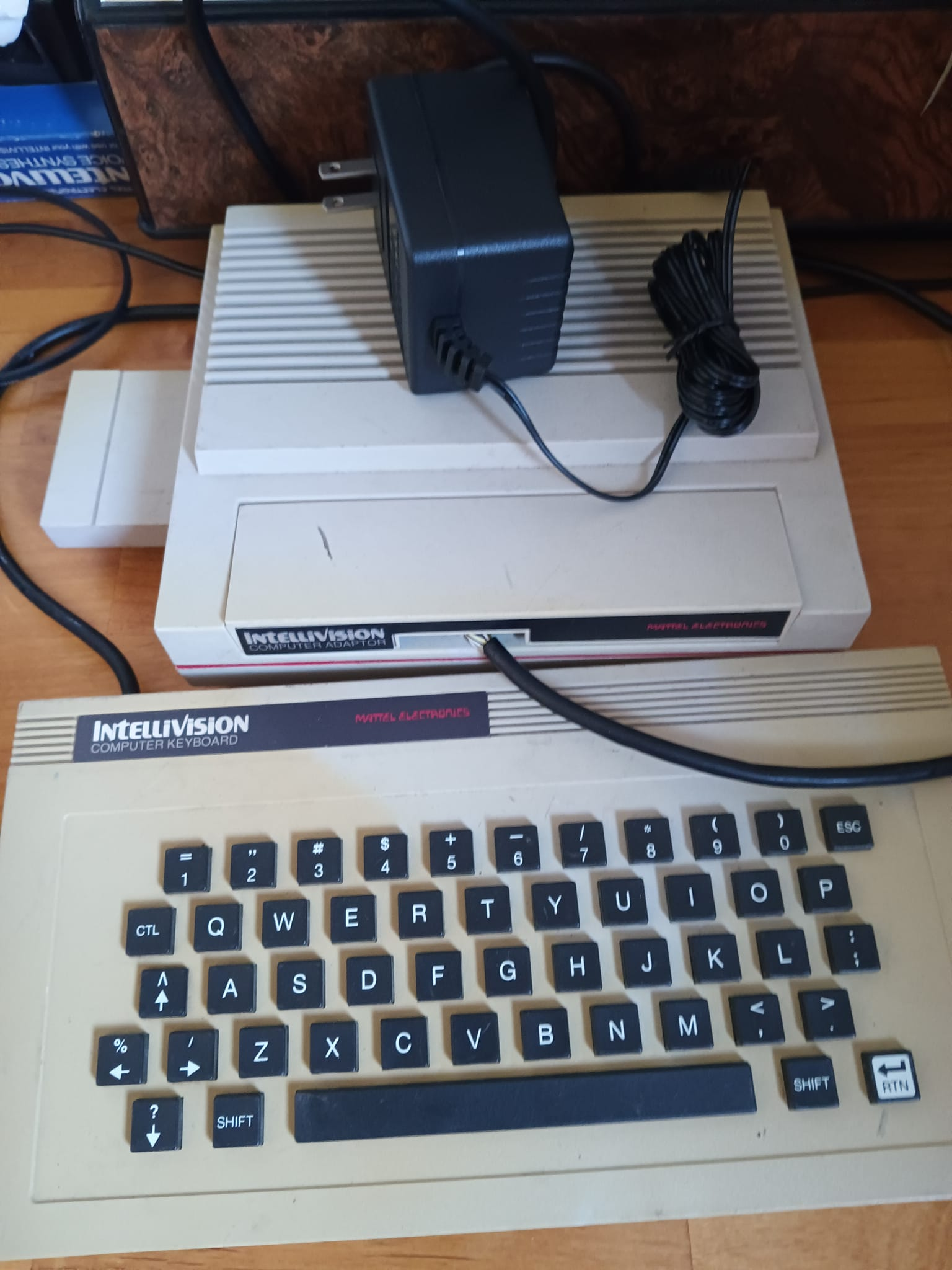
Entertainment Computer System with Keyboard and Power Supply

In mid-1981, Mattel's upper management was becoming concerned that the Keyboard Component group would never be able to produce a sellable product. As a result, Design and Development set up a competing engineering team whose stated mission was to produce an inexpensive add-on called the "Basic Development System", or BDS, to be sold as an educational device to introduce kids to the concepts of computer programming.

The rival BDS engineering group eventually came up with a much less expensive alternative. Originally dubbed the "Lucky", from LUCKI: Low User-Cost Keyboard Interface, it lacked many of the sophisticated features envisioned for the original Keyboard Component. Gone, for example, was the 16K (8MB max) of RAM, the secondary CPU, and high resolution text; instead, the ECS offered a mere 2KB RAM expansion, a built-in BASIC that was marginally functional, plus a much-simplified cassette and printer interface. Ultimately, this fulfilled the original promise of turning the Intellivision into a computer, making it possible to write programs and store them to tape as well as interfacing with a printer. It even offered, via an additional sound chip (AY-3-8917) inside the ECS module and an optional 49-key music synthesizer keyboard, the possibility of turning the Intellivision into a multi-voice synthesizer which could be used to play or learn music.

In the fall of 1982, the LUCKI, now renamed the Entertainment Computer System (ECS), was presented at the annual sales meeting, officially ending the ill-fated keyboard component project. A new advertising campaign was aired in time for the 1982 Christmas season, and the ECS itself was shown to the public at the January 1983 Consumer Electronics Show (CES) in Las Vegas. However, it would not see release until late December as the Intellivision Computer Module.

Prior to release, an internal shake-up at the top levels of Mattel Electronics' management had caused the company's focus to shift away from hardware add-ons in favor of software, and the ECS received very little in terms of furthering the marketing push. Further hardware developments, including a planned Program Expander that would have added another 16K of RAM and a more intricate, fully featured Extended-BASIC to the system, were halted. In the end, six games were released for the ECS; a few more were completed but not released.

The ECS Computer Module also offered four player game-play with the optional addition of two extra hand controllers. Four player games were in development when Mattel Electronics closed in 1984. World Cup Soccer was later completed and released in 1985 by Dextel in Europe and then INTV Corporation in North America. The documentation does not mention it but when the ECS Computer Adapter is used, World Cup Soccer can be played with one to four players, or two players cooperatively against the computer.

=== Intellivoice ===
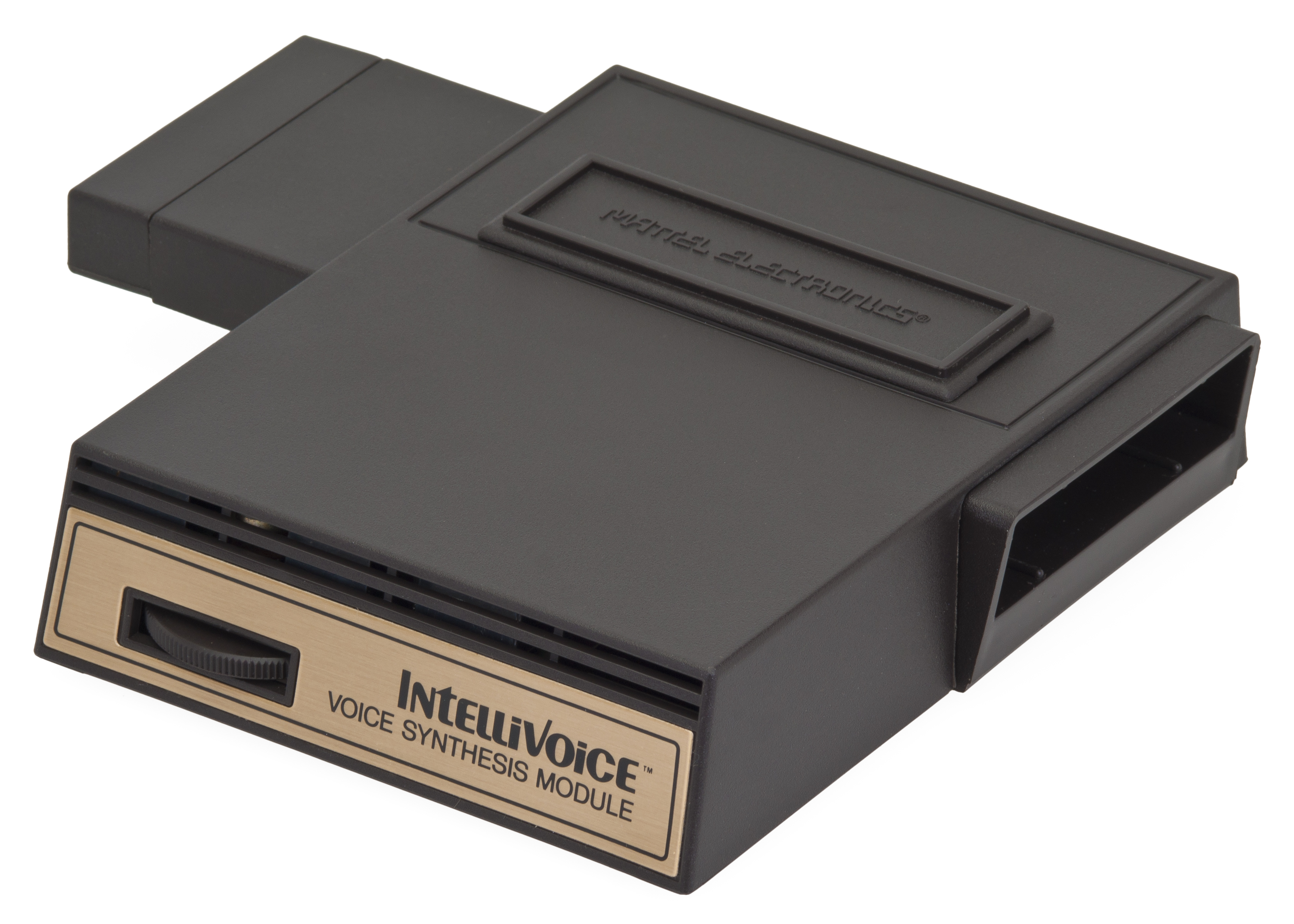
The Intellivoice add-on

In 1982, Mattel introduced the Intellivoice Voice Synthesis Module, a speech synthesizer for compatible cartridges. The Intellivoice was novel in two respects: human sounding male and female voices with distinct accents, and speech-supporting games designed with speech as an integral part of the gameplay.

Like the Intellivision chipset, the Intellivoice chipset was developed by General Instrument. The SP0256-012 orator chip has 2KB ROM inside and is used to store the speech for numerical digits, some common words, and the phrase "Mattel Electronics presents". Speech can also be processed from the Intellivoice's SP650 buffer chip, stored and loaded from cartridge memory. That buffer chip has its own I/O and the Intellivoice has a 30-pin expansion port under a removable top plate. Mattel Electronics planned to use that connector for wireless hand controllers.

Mattel Electronics built a state of the art voice processing lab to produce the phrases used in Intellivoice games. However, the amount of speech that could be compressed into an 8K or 12K cartridge and still leave room for a game was limited. Intellivoice cartridges Space Spartans and B-17 Bomber did sell about 300,000 copies each, priced a few dollars more than regular Intellivision cartridges. However, at $79, the Intellivoice did not sell as well as Mattel expected; Intellivoices were later offered free with the purchase of a Master Component. In August 1983, the Intellivoice system was quietly phased out. A children's title called Magic Carousel and foreign-language versions of Space Spartans were completed but shelved. Additional games Woody Woodpecker and Space Shuttle went unfinished with the voice recordings unused.

Four Intellivoice games were released: Space Spartans, B-17 Bomber, Bomb Squad, and Tron: Solar Sailer.

A fifth game, Intellivision World Series Major League Baseball, developed as part of the Entertainment Computer System series, also supports the Intellivoice if both the ECS and Intellivoice are connected concurrently. Unlike the Intellivoice-specific games, however, World Series Major League Baseball is also playable without the Intellivoice module (but not without the ECS).

=== Intellivision II ===
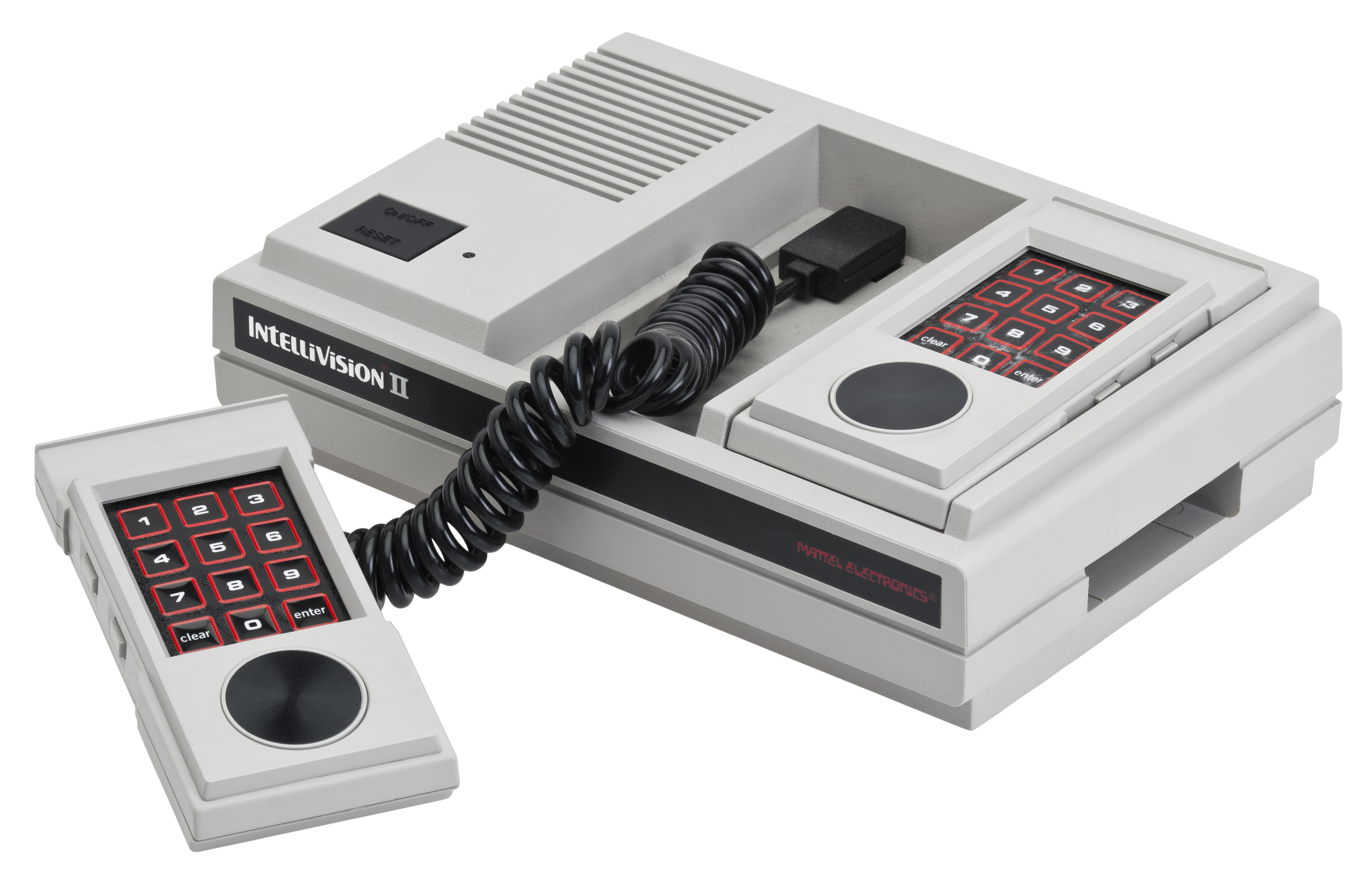
The Intellivision II redesign was much smaller and cheaper to manufacture than the original.

In the spring of 1983, Mattel introduced the Intellivision II, a cheaper, more compact redesign of the original, that was designed to be less expensive to manufacture and service, with updated styling. It also had longer controller cords. The Intellivision II was initially released without a pack-in game but was later packaged with BurgerTime in the United States and Lock 'n' Chase in Canada. In 1984, the Digiplay Intellivision II was introduced in Brazil. Brazil was the only country outside North America to have the redesigned Intellivision II.

Using an external AC Adapter (16.2V AC), consolidating some ICs, and taking advantage of relaxed FCC emission standards, the Intellivision II has a significantly smaller footprint than the original. The controllers, now detachable, have a different feel, with plastic rather than rubber side buttons and a flat membrane keypad. Users of the original Intellivision missed the ability to find keypad buttons by the tactile feel of the original controller bubble keypad.

One functional difference was the addition of a video input to the cartridge port, added specifically to support the System Changer, an accessory also released in 1983 by Mattel that played Atari 2600 cartridges through the Intellivision. The Intellivision hand controllers could be used to play Atari 2600 games. The System Changer also had two controller ports compatible with Atari joysticks. The original Intellivision required a hardware modification, a service provided by Mattel, to work with the System Changer. Otherwise the Intellivision II was promoted to be compatible with the original.

It was discovered that a few Coleco Intellivision games did not work on the Intellivision II. Mattel secretly changed the Exec internal ROM program in an attempt to lock out third-party games. A few of Coleco's early games were affected but the 3rd party developers quickly figured out how to get around it. Mattel's own Electric Company Word Fun, however, will not run on the Intellivision II due to this change. In an unrelated issue but also due to Exec changes, Super Pro Football experiences a minor glitch where the quarterback does not appear until after the ball is hiked. There were also some minor changes to the sound chip (AY-3-8914A/AY-3-8916) affecting sound effects in some games. Programmers at Mattel discovered the audio differences and avoided the problem in future games.

=== Decade ===
As early as 1981, Dave Chandler's group began designing what would have been Mattel's next-generation console, codenamed Decade and now referred to as the Intellivision IV. It would have been based on the 32-bit MC68000 processor and a 16-bit custom designed advanced graphic interface chip. Specifications called for dual-display support, 240×192 bitmap resolution, 16 programmable 12-bit colors (4096 colors), anti-aliasing, 40×24 tiled graphics modes, four colors per tile (16 with shading), text layer and independent scrolling, 16 multicolored 16×16 sprites per scan-line, 32 level hardware sprite scaling. Line interrupts for reprogramming sprite and color registers would allow for many more sprites and colors on screen at the same time. It was intended as a machine that could lead Mattel Electronics into the 1990s; however, on August 4, 1983, most hardware people at Mattel Electronics were laid off.

=== Intellivision III ===
Also in 1981, Mattel Electronics executives indicated to APh, interest in a successor system for 1983. Although planned for some time, APh redirected staff efforts on the Intellivision III hardware around summer 1982. Based on a faster CP1610 for backward compatibility, APh developed an updated graphics STIC chip with 4x the resolution, more sprites, and more colors. Mattel Electronics programmers developing the EXEC software. When Mattel Electronics cancelled the project in mid-1983, Toshiba was laying out the new graphics chip, consoles expected to be in production by Christmas, cartridges to be ready by January 1984, according to Glenn Hightower of APh. A Mattel document titled Target Specification Intellivision III has the following.

- CPU: CP1610-2 at 3.56 MHz (2x original CPU speed)
  - separate 16-bit data bus and address bus
  - multiplexed data/address mode for backward compatibility with existing cartridges
- Graphics: STIC 1B
  - tiled graphics, 20 cards by 24 rows
    - 2-color 16×8 pixel cards for a resolution of 320×192
    - 4-color 8×8 pixel cards for a resolution of 160×192
  - 40 x 24 alphanumerics
  - 16 programmable colors
    - color palette selectable per card
    - 12-bit RGB definition for 4096 possible colors
  - 8 sprites per scanline
    - reusable on different scanlines
    - 16 pixels wide in 1 color, 8 pixels wide in 3 colors
    - up-to 255 lines high
    - overlap detect of individual colors
  - fine pixel horizontal and vertical scrolling (backward compatible)
  - single data bus allows graphics ROM/RAM storage on cartridges
  - STIC 1 backwards-compatible mode
- RAM: 4K words, 16-bit, DRAM (upgradable to 65K words)
- five channel sound with improved frequency range (backward-compatible)
- integrated Intellivoice

=== Competition and market crash ===
According to the company's 1982 Form 10-K, Mattel had almost 20% of the domestic video-game market. Mattel Electronics provided 25% of revenue and 50% of operating income in fiscal 1982. Although the Atari 2600 had more third-party development, Creative Computing Video & Arcade Games reported after visiting the summer 1982 Consumer Electronics Show that "the momentum is tremendous". Activision and Imagic began releasing games for the Intellivision, as did hardware rival Coleco. Mattel created "M Network" branded games for Atari's system. The company's advertisement budget increased to over $20 million for the year. In its October 1982 stockholders' report Mattel announced that Electronics had, so far that year, posted a nearly $100 million profit on nearly $500 million sales; a threefold increase over October 1981.

However, the same report predicted a loss for the upcoming quarter. Hiring still continued, as did the company's optimism that the investment in software and hardware development would pay off. The M Network brand expanded to personal computers. An office in Taiwan was opened to handle Apple II programming. The original five-person Mattel game development team had grown to 110 people under new vice president Baum, while Daglow led Intellivision development and top engineer Minkoff directed all work on all other platforms. In February 1983, Mattel Electronics opened an office in the south of France to provide European input to Intellivision games and develop games for the ColecoVision. At its peak Mattel Electronics employed 1800 people.

Amid the flurry of new hardware and software development, there was trouble for the Intellivision. New game systems (ColecoVision and Atari 5200) introduced in 1982 took advantage of falling RAM prices to offer graphics closer to arcade quality. In 1983, the price of home computers, particularly the Commodore 64, came down drastically to compete with video game system sales. The market became flooded with hardware and software, and retailers were ill-equipped to cope. In spring 1983, hiring at Mattel Electronics came to a halt.

At the June 1983 Consumer Electronics Show in Chicago, Mattel Electronics had the opportunity to show off all their new products. The response was underwhelming. Several people in top management positions were replaced due to massive losses. On July 12, 1983, Mattel Electronics President Josh Denham was replaced with outsider Mack Morris. Morris brought in former Mattel Electronics president and marketing director Jeff Rochlis as a consultant and all projects were under review. The Intellivision III was cancelled and then all new hardware development was stopped when 660 jobs were cut on August 4. The price of the Intellivision II (which launched at $150 earlier that year) was lowered to $69, and Mattel Electronics was to be a software company. However, by October 1983, Electronics' losses were over $280 million for the year and one third of the programming staff were laid off. Another third were gone by November, and, on January 20, 1984, the remaining programming staff were laid off. The Taiwan and French offices continued a little while longer due to contract and legal obligations. On February 4, 1984, Mattel sold the Intellivision business for $20 million. In 1983, 750,000 Intellivision Master Components were sold, compared to 1.8 million in 1982.

=== INTV Corporation (1984–1990) ===
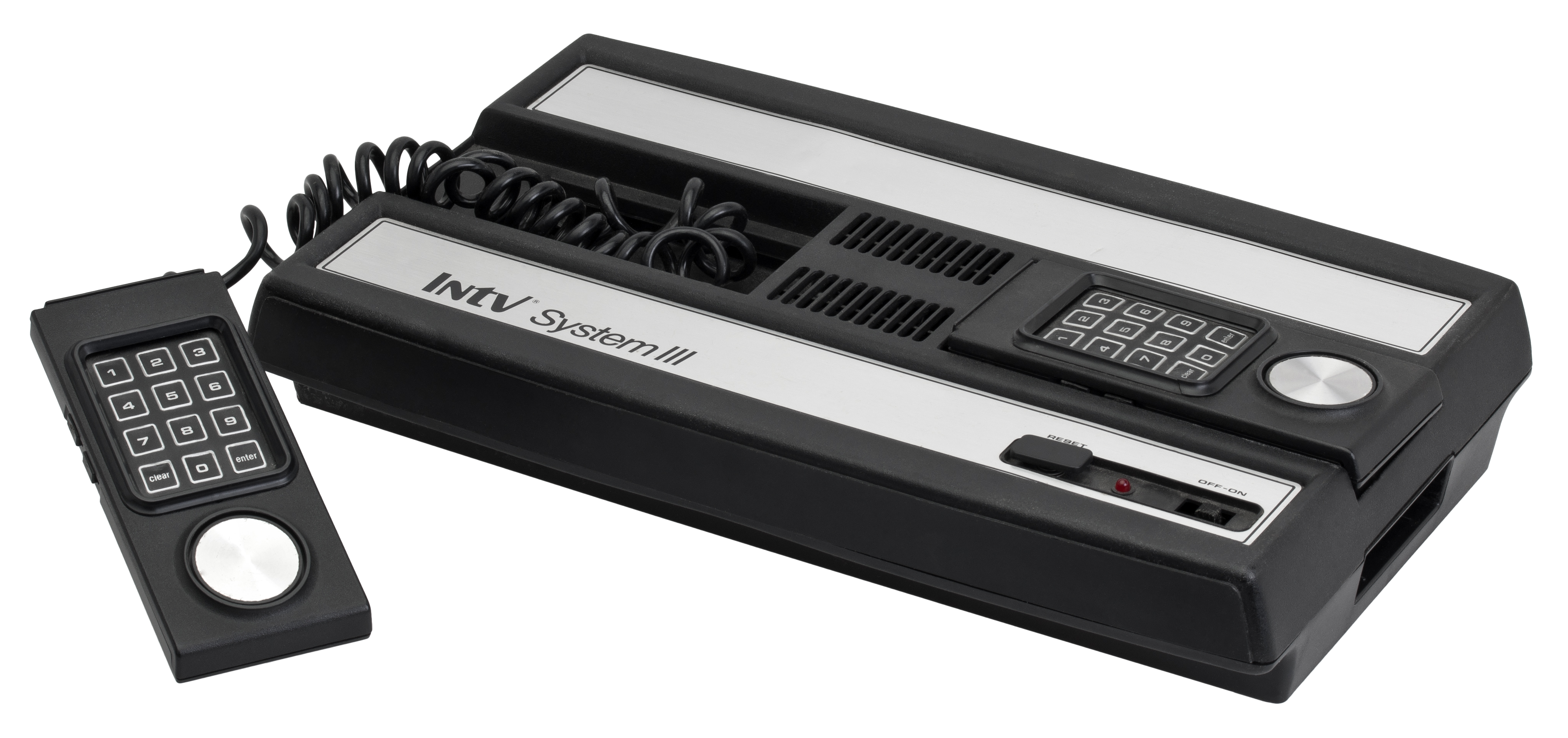
INTV Corp produced their own Intellivision, the INTV System III, after buying the rights from Mattel following the market crash.

Former Mattel Electronics Senior Vice President of Marketing, Terrence Valeski, understood that although losses were huge, the demand for video games increased in 1983. Valeski found investors and purchased the rights to Intellivision, the games, and inventory from Mattel. A new company, Intellivision Inc, was formed and by the end of 1984 Valeski bought out the other investors and changed the name to INTV Corporation. They continued to supply the large toy stores and sold games through direct mail order. At first they sold the existing inventory of games and Intellivision II systems. When the inventory of games sold out they produced more, but without the Mattel name or unnecessary licenses on the printed materials. To lower costs, the boxes, instructions, and overlays were produced at lower quality compared to Mattel.

In France, the Mattel Electronics office found investors and became Nice Ideas in April 1984. They continued to work on Intellivision, Colecovision, and other computer games. They produced Intellivision World Cup Soccer and Championship Tennis, both released in 1985 by European publisher Dextel.

In 1985, INTV Corporation introduced the INTV System III, also branded as the Intellivision Super Pro System, using the same design as the original Intellivision model but in black and silver. That same year INTV Corp introduced two new games that were completed at Mattel but not released: Thunder Castle and World Championship Baseball. With their early success INTV Corp decided to produce new games and in 1986 introduced Super Pro Football, an update of Mattel NFL Football. INTV Corp continued a relationship that Mattel had with Data East and produced all new cartridges such as Commando in 1987 and Body Slam Wrestling in 1988. Also in 1987, INTV Corp released Dig Dug, purchased from Atari where the game was completed but not released in 1984. They also got into producing next-generation games with the production of Monster Truck Rally for Nintendo Entertainment System (NES) in 1991, also released as Stadium Mud Buggies for Intellivision in 1989.

Licensing agreements with Nintendo and Sega required INTV Corporation to discontinue the Intellivision in 1990. INTV Corporation did publish 21 new Intellivision cartridges bringing the Intellivision library to a total of 124 cartridges plus one compilation cartridge.

=== Tutorvision ===
In 1989, INTV Corp and World Book Encyclopedia entered into an agreement to manufacture an educational video game system called Tutorvision. It is a modified Intellivision, the case molded in light beige with gold and blue trim. The Exec ROM expanded, system RAM increased to 1.75K, and graphics RAM increased to 2KB. That is enough graphics RAM to define unique graphic tiles for the entire screen.

Games were designed by World Book, J. Hakansson Associates, and programmed by Realtime Associates. Sixteen games were in production, plus one Canadian variation. However, the cartridges and the Tutorvision were never released; instead World Book and INTV Corporation sued each other. In 1990, INTV Corporation filed for bankruptcy protection and closed in 1991.

An unknown number of later Intellivision SuperPro systems have Tutorvision hardware inside. A subset of these units contain the full Tutorvision EXEC and can play Tutorvision games.

== Hardware specifications ==
=== Master Component ===
Intellivision, Super Video Arcade, Tandyvision One, Intellivision II, INTV System III, Super Pro System

- General Instrument CP1610 16-bit microprocessor CPU
  - 1 microsecond cycle time, 2 MHz 2-phase clock (1.117 μs and 1.7897725 MHz NTSC)
  - 16-bit multiplexed data/address bus
- 1456 bytes of RAM (SRAM):
  - 240 × 8-bit scratchpad memory
  - 352 × 16-bit (704 bytes) system memory, General Instrument RA-3-9600 dual-ported, bridges CPU and STIC buses, 240 words used for graphics
  - 512 × 8-bit graphics RAM
- 7168 bytes of ROM:
  - 4096 × 10-bit (5120 bytes) executive ROM (4352 x 10-bit Intellivision II)
  - 2048 × 8-bit graphics ROM (344 bytes used by Exec program)
- Standard Television Interface Chip (STIC): General Instrument AY-3-8900/AY-3-8900-1
  - operates at 4 MHz or 3.579545 MHz (NTSC)
  - 14-bit multiplexed data/address bus shared with CPU
  - 20×12 tiled playfield, tiles are 8×8 pixels for a resolution of 159×96 (right pixel not displayed)
    - 16 color palette, two colors per tile
    - Foreground/Background mode; all 16 colors available for background and colors 1–8 available for foreground per tile; grom cards limited to the first 64
    - Color Stack mode; all 16 colors available for foreground per tile; background colour from a four colour rotating stack of any four colors, all 277 grom and gram cards available
    - Colored Squares mode allows each tile to have four different colored 4×4 blocks (e.g. Snafu); first seven colors available for foreground blocks; background colour from the color stack
  - 8 sprites (all visible on the same scanline). Hardware supports the following features per-sprite:
    - coordinate addressable off screen for smooth edge entries and exits
    - Size selection: 8×16 or 8 pixels wide by 8 half-pixels high
    - Stretching: horizontal (1× or 2×) and vertical (1×, 2×, 4× or 8×)
    - Mirroring: horizontal and vertical
    - Collision detection: sprite to sprite, sprite to background, and sprite to screen border
    - Priority: selects whether sprite appears in front of or behind background.
  - fine horizontal and vertical pixel scrolling
  - all STIC attributes and GRAM re-programmable at VBLANK, 60 times a second
- Three-channel sound, with one noise generator, audio chip: General Instrument AY-3-8914 (AY-3-8914A/AY-3-8916 Intellivision II)
- Connections:
  - 44-pin cartridge/expansion port
    - 64K addressable (approx 50K available), more with memory bank switching
    - typical cartridges: 4K, 6K, 8K, 12K, 16K, 24K (10-bit ROMs)
  - 2 x 9-pin controller connectors
    - inline pin connectors internally accessible on original Intellivision and INTV systems
    - DE-9 connectors externally accessible on Super Video Arcade and Intellivision II
  - RF/RCA audio/video connector; RGB/SCART/Péritel in France
  - Intellivision II only: external power adapter 16.7Vac 1amp or 16.2Vac 955mA

=== Game controller ===
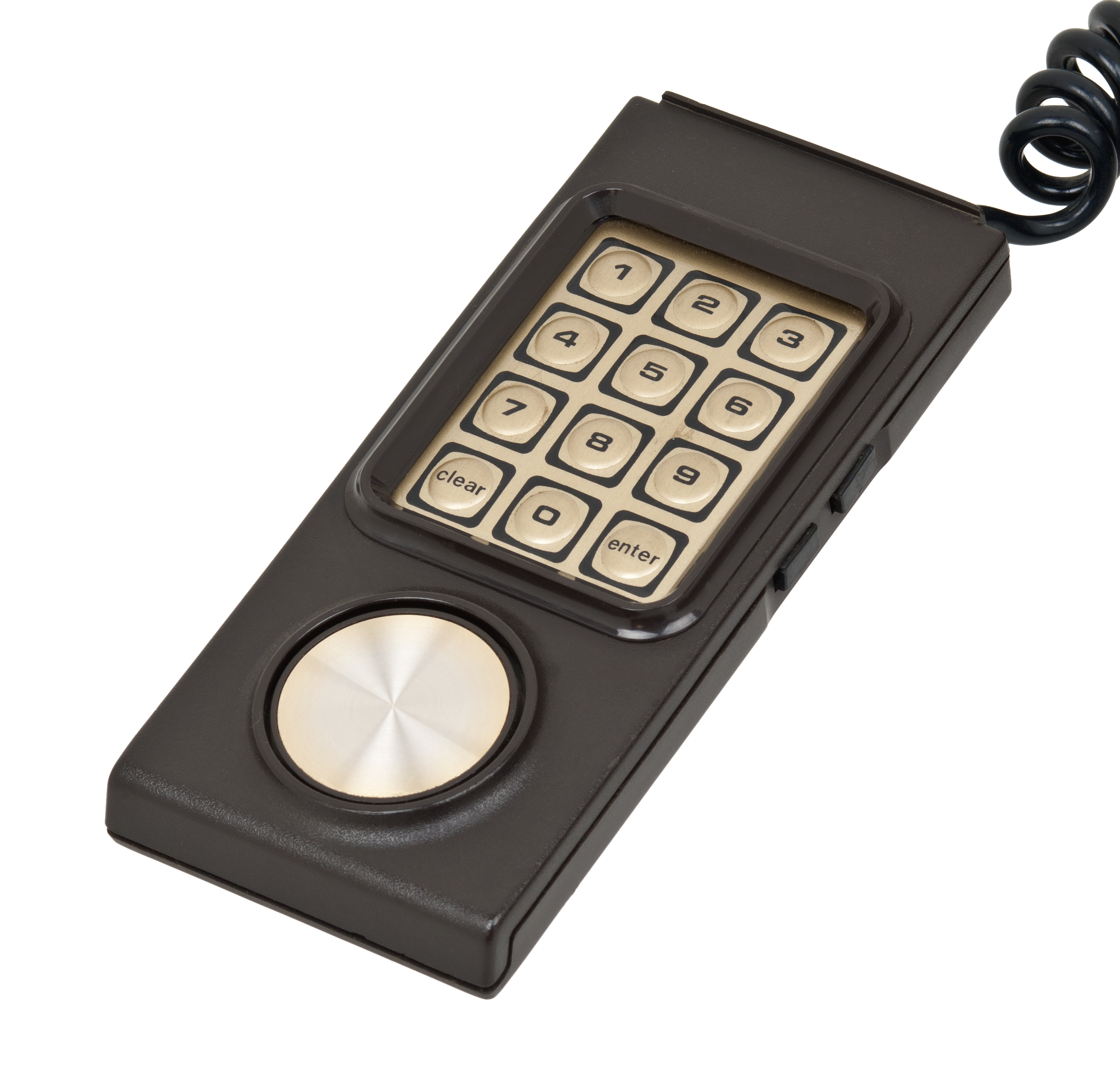
The original Intellivision controller with no overlay inserted

The Intellivision controller features:

- 12-button numeric keypad (0–9, clear, and enter)
- Four side-located action buttons (two for left handed players, two for right handed players)
  - top two side buttons are electronically the same, giving three distinct buttons
- A directional pad, capable of detecting 16 directions of movement
- Plastic overlays that slide into place as an extra layer on the keypad to show game-specific key functions

The directional pad was called a "control disc" and marketed as having the "functionality of both a joystick and a paddle". The controller was ranked the fourth worst video game controller by IGN editor Craig Harris.

=== Peripherals ===
- Keyboard Component (limited availability)
  - 6502 CPU, 16K × 10-bit DRAM, 40×24 text overlay, tape-drive, microphone input, two expansion ports
- PlayCable (availability through cable TV provider 1981–1983)
  - Mattel and General Instrument joint venture, manufactured by GI/Jerrold
  - 8K x 10bit RAM
- Intellivoice Voice Synthesis Module
  - General Instrument SP0256-012
- Computer Module (includes the following)
  - Computer Adapter
    - 2K x 8-bit SRAM, 12K ECS Exec/BASIC ROM, memory expansion port (discontinued)
    - AY-3-8917 sound generator
    - two DE-9 hand controller connectors
    - audio tape recorder data storage interface, two 3.5mm mono jacks and one 2.5mm jack for optional tape control
    - auxiliary jack for a serial printer connection (Mattel Aquarius compatible), 3.5mm stereo jack that is RS-232C compatible, where tip is data transmit, ring is DSR/DCD, sleeve is ground, 1200 baud, 8 data bits, 2 stop bits, and no parity
    - external power adapter 10Vac 1amp
  - Computer Keyboard
- Music Synthesizer (requires Computer Adapter)
  - 49 key piano keyboard
- System Changer
  - Atari 2600 compatible cartridge slot
  - two DE-9 Atari 2600 compatible controller connectors
- Videoplexer (from Compro Electronics)
  - cartridge switching accessory with eight cartridge slots

== Reception ==
A July 1980 article in Video magazine said "Now, arcade addicts can revel in the most sophisticated games this side of the complex simulations designed for high-level computers right in their own livingrooms.", "It may not be perfect but it's certainly the best unit offered so far to players of electronic video games.", "Those used to joysticks will have to endure a short period of adjustment, but even finicky players will be forced to agree that the company has developed a truly elegant solution to the controller problem."

Ken Uston published Ken Uston's Guide to Buying and Beating the Home Video Games in 1982 as a guide to potential buyers of console systems/cartridges, as well as a brief strategy guide to numerous cartridge games then in existence. He described Intellivision as "the most mechanically reliable of the systems… The controller (used during "many hours of experimentation") worked with perfect consistency. The unit never had overheating problems, nor were loose wires or other connections encountered." However, Uston rated the controls and control system as "below average" and the worst of the consoles he tested (including Atari 2600, Magnavox Odyssey², Astrovision, and Fairchild Channel F).

Jeff Rovin lists Intellivision as one of the seven major suppliers of videogames in 1982 and mentions it as "the unchallenged king of graphics", but says the controllers can be "difficult to operate", mentions the fact that if a controller breaks the entire unit must be shipped off for repairs (since they did not detach at first), and explains that the overlays "are sometimes so stubborn as to tempt one's patience" .

A 1996 article in Next Generation said the Intellivision "had greater graphics power than the dominant Atari 2600. It was slower than the 2600 and had less software available, but it was known for its superior sports titles." A year later, Electronic Gaming Monthly assessed the Intellivision in an overview of older gaming consoles, remarking that the controllers "were as comfortable as they were practical. The unique disk-shaped directional pad provided unprecedented control for the time, and the numeric keypad opened up new options previously unavailable in console gaming." They praised the breadth of the software library but said there was a lack of genuinely stand-out games.

== Legacy ==
=== Intellivision Lives! ===
Intellivision games became readily available again when Keith Robinson and Stephen Roney, both former Intellivision programmers at Mattel Electronics, obtained exclusive rights to the Intellivision and games in 1997. That year they formed a new company, Intellivision Productions, and made Intellivision for PC Volume 1 available as a free download. Intellivision games could be played on a modern computer for the first time. That download includes three Intellivision games and an MS-DOS Intellivision emulator that plays original game code. It was followed by Volume 2 and another three games including Deep Pockets Super Pro Pool & Billiards; a game completed in 1990 but never released until this download in 1997. In 2000, the Intellipack 3 download was available with another four Intellivision games and emulators for Windows or Macintosh.

Intellivision Productions released Intellivision Lives! and Intellivision Rocks on compact disc in 1998 and 2001. These compilation CDs play the original game code through emulators for MS-DOS, Windows, and Macintosh computers. Together they have over 100 Intellivision games including never before released King of the Mountain, Takeover, Robot Rubble, League of Light, and others. Intellivision Rocks includes Intellivision games made by Activision and Imagic. Some games could not be included due to licensing, others simply used different titles to avoid trademarked names. The CDs are also a resource for development history, box art, hidden features, programmer biographies, video interviews, and original commercials.

Also in 1997, Intellivision Productions announced they would sell development tools allowing customers to program their own Intellivision games. They were to provide documentation, PC compatible cross-assemblers, and the Magus II PC Intellivision cartridge interface. Unfortunately, the project was cancelled but they did provide copies of "Your Friend the EXEC", the programmers guide to the Intellivision Executive control software. By 2000 Intellivision hobbyists ultimately created their own development tools, including Intellivision memory cartridges.

In 2005, Intellivision Productions announced that new Intellivision cartridges were to be produced. "Deep Pockets and Illusions will be the first two releases in a series of new cartridges for the Intellivision. The printed circuit boards, the cartridge casings, the boxes are all being custom manufactured for this special series." Illusions was completed at Mattel Electronics' French office in 1983 but never released. Deep Pockets Super Pro Pool & Billiards was programmed for INTV Corporation in 1990 and only released as a ROM file in 1998. However, no cartridges were produced. Previously, in 2000, Intellivision Productions did release new cartridges for the Atari 2600 and Colecovision. Sea Battle and Swordfight were Atari 2600 games created by Mattel Electronics in the early 1980s but not previously released. Steamroller (Colecovision) was developed for Activision in 1984 and not previously released.

=== Licensing Intellivision Games ===
Also in 1999, Activision released A Collection of Intellivision Classic Games for PlayStation. Also known as Intellivision Classics, it has 30 emulated Intellivision games as well as video interviews of some of the original programmers. All of the games were licensed from Intellivision Productions and none of the Activision or Imagic Intellivision games were included. In 2003, Crave Entertainment released a PlayStation 2 version of Intellivision Lives! followed by versions for the Xbox and GameCube in 2004. In 2010, Virtual Play Games released Intellivision Lives! for the Nintendo DS including one never before released game, Blow Out. In 2008 Microsoft made Intellivision Lives! an available download on the Xbox Live Marketplace as an Xbox Original and playable on the Xbox 360.

In 2003, the Intellivision 25 and Intellivision 10 direct-to-TV systems were released by Techno Source Ltd. These are an all-in-one single controller design that plugs directly into a television. One includes 25 games the other ten. These Intellivision games were not emulated but rewritten for the native processor (Famiclone-based hardware) and adapted to a contemporary controller. As such they look and play differently than Intellivision. In 2005 they were updated for two-player play as the Intellivision X2 with 15 games. They were commercially very successful altogether selling about 4 million units by end of 2006.

Several licensed Intellivision games became available to Windows computers through the GameTap subscription gaming service in 2005 including Astrosmash, Buzz Bombers, Hover Force, Night Stalker, Pinball, Shark! Shark!, Skiing and Snafu. Installation of the GameTap Player software was required to access the emulator and games. The VH1 Online Arcade made nine Intellivision games available in 2007. Using a Shockwave emulator these Intellivision games could be played directly through a web browser with Shockwave Player. In 2010, VH1 Classic and MTV Networks released 6 Intellivision games to iOS. Intellivision games were first adapted to mobile phones and published by THQ Wireless in 2001. On March 24, 2010, Microsoft launched the Game Room service for Xbox Live and Games for Windows Live. This service includes support for Intellivision games and allows players to compete for high scores via online leaderboards. At the 2011 Consumer Electronics Show, Microsoft announced a version of Game Room for Windows Phone, promising a catalog of 44 Intellivision games. AtGames and its Direct2Drive digital store has Windows compatible Intellivision compilations available for download purchase.

=== Intellivision Flashback ===
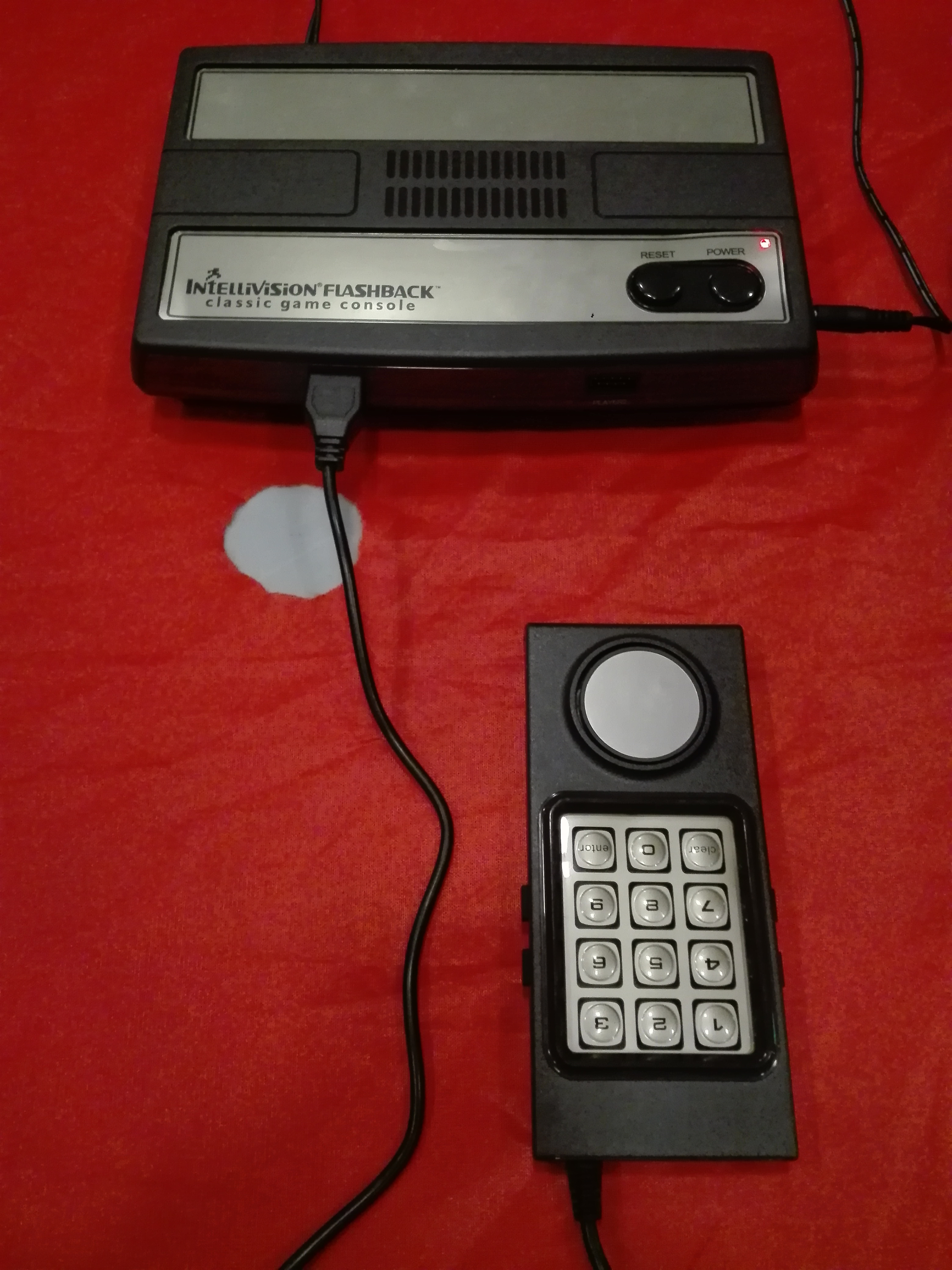
Intellivision Flashback

The number of Intellivision games that can be played effectively with contemporary game controllers is limited. On October 1, 2014, AtGames Digital Media, Inc., under license from Intellivision Productions, Inc., released the Intellivision Flashback classic game console. It is a miniature sized Intellivision console with two original sized Intellivision controllers. While adapters have been available to interface original Intellivision controllers to personal computers, the Intellivision Flashback includes two new Intellivision controllers identical in layout and function to the originals. It comes with 60 (61 at Dollar General) emulated Intellivision games built into ROM and a sample set of plastic overlays for 10 games. The Advanced Dungeons & Dragons games were included as Crown of Kings and Minotaur. As with many of the other Intellivision compilations, no games requiring third-party licensing were included.

=== Intellivision Entertainment ===
In May 2018, Tommy Tallarico announced that he acquired the rights to the Intellivision brand and games with plans to launch a new home video game console, the Intellivision Amico. A new company, Intellivision Entertainment, was formed with Tallarico serving as president. Intellivision Productions has been renamed Blue Sky Rangers Inc. and their video game intellectual property has been transferred to Intellivision Entertainment.

In 2021 Blaze Entertainment released a collection of twelve emulated Intellivision games for the Evercade systems. They released a second collection of twelve emulated Intellivision games in 2022.

=== Intellivision Sprint ===
On May 23, 2024, Atari, Inc. announced the acquisition of the Intellivision brand and library from Intellivision Entertainment. The deal did not include the unreleased Intellivision Amico console nor the Intellivision Entertainment company itself, both of which would be renamed. However, that company would secure a licensing deal with Atari to continue to release newer versions of Intellivision titles for the Amico.

Atari announced the Intellivision Sprint for pre-orders in October 2025, and shipping on December 5, 2025, for $150. As a retro console based on the original Intellivision design, the Intellivision Sprint includes 45 games from the original Intellivision. It includes two controllers based on the original design of the Intellivision, though both are wireless and charged by USB ports on the console. Overlays for each of the built in games are included. The console also supports HDMI video output and USB-A connections.

== Innovations ==
- Intellivision was the first 16-bit game console, as it has a 16-bit microprocessor with 16-bit registers, 16-bit RAM, and a 16-bit data bus.
- The first home console and one of the first video games to use a tile-based playfield. It allowed for the display of detailed graphics and colour with very little RAM.
- The Intellivision was also the first system to feature downloadable games with PlayCable in 1981.
- Intellivision was the first game console to provide real-time human voices in the middle of gameplay, courtesy of the Intellivoice module.
- The first game controller with a directional thumb pad.
- The Intellivision was also the first game console or home computer to offer a musical synthesizer keyboard.
- Intellivision was also the first console to have a complete built-in character font. While Odyssey² had a limited character font (uppercase alphabet, numerals, and some other characters), Intellivision's system font had complete upper- and lowercase alphabets, numerals, and almost all of the punctuation and symbols found on standard computer keyboards.
- Utopia (1982) is credited as the game that spawned the construction and management simulation genre.
- World Series Major League Baseball (1983) is considered to be the first sports simulation video game with a number of innovations: multiple views of a 3D calculated virtual play-field, statistical based game-play using real historical baseball player statistics, manager player substitutions, play-by-play speech, and save games or lineups to tape storage.

== See also ==
- Entertainment Computer System
- Intellivision Lives!
- Intellivoice
- List of Intellivision games
- PlayCable
- TV POWWW (interactive TV game show that used Intellivision)
