= 1982 in video games =

1982 was the peak year for the golden age of arcade video games as well as the second generation of video game consoles. Many games were released that would spawn franchises, or at least sequels, including Dig Dug, Pole Position, Microsoft Flight Simulator, Mr. Do!, Zaxxon, Q*bert, Time Pilot and Pitfall! The year's highest-grossing video game was Namco's arcade game Pac-Man, for the third year in a row, while the year's best-selling home system was the Atari 2600 (Atari VCS). Additional video game consoles added to a crowded market, notably the ColecoVision and Atari 5200. Troubles at Atari later in the year triggered the video game crash of 1983.

== Financial performance ==
- The US arcade video game market is worth $4.3 billion, equivalent to $14.3 billion adjusted for inflation.
- The US home video game market is worth $3.8 billion, equivalent to $12.7 billion adjusted for inflation.
- The Japanese home video game market is approaching ¥300 billion, equivalent to $4.59 billion adjusted for inflation.

=== Japan ===
In Japan, the following titles were the highest-grossing arcade video games of 1982, according to the annual Game Machine chart.

Rank	Title	Genre	Manufacturer
1	Pole Position	Racing	Namco
2	Dig Dug	Maze	Namco
3	Galaga	Fixed shooter	Namco
4	Pengo	Maze	Sega
5	Time Pilot	Shoot 'em up	Konami
6	Donkey Kong	Platform	Nintendo
7	Front Line	Shoot 'em up	Taito
8	Donkey Kong Jr.	Platform	Nintendo
9	Burnin' Rubber (Bump 'n' Jump)	Vehicular combat	Data East
10	Mr. Do!	Maze	Universal

=== United States ===
In the United States, the following titles were the highest-grossing arcade games of 1982, according to RePlay and Cash Box magazines and the Amusement & Music Operators Association (AMOA).

Rank	RePlay	Cash Box	AMOA	Play Meter
1	Donkey Kong	Ms. Pac-Man		
2	Unknown	Pac-Man	Pac-Man, Centipede, Donkey Kong, Defender, Zaxxon	Unknown
3	Unknown	Donkey Kong, Centipede	Pac-Man, Centipede, Donkey Kong, Defender, Zaxxon	Unknown
4	Unknown	Donkey Kong, Centipede	Pac-Man, Centipede, Donkey Kong, Defender, Zaxxon	Unknown
5	Unknown	—N/a	Pac-Man, Centipede, Donkey Kong, Defender, Zaxxon	Unknown
6	Unknown	—N/a	Pac-Man, Centipede, Donkey Kong, Defender, Zaxxon	Unknown

The following table lists the top-grossing titles of each month in 1982, according to the RePlay and Play Meter charts.

Month	RePlay		Play Meter	Ref
Month	Upright cabinet	Cocktail cabinet	Play Meter	Ref
January	Pac-Man	—N/a	Unknown	
February	Pac-Man	Pac-Man	Unknown	
March	Pac-Man	Pac-Man / Ms. Pac-Man	Unknown	
April	Ms. Pac-Man	Pac-Man / Ms. Pac-Man	Donkey Kong	
May	Ms. Pac-Man	Pac-Man / Ms. Pac-Man	Turbo	
June	Zaxxon	Unknown	Unknown	
July	Ms. Pac-Man	Ms. Pac-Man	Unknown	
August	Ms. Pac-Man	Pac-Man / Ms. Pac-Man	Unknown	
September	Ms. Pac-Man	Pac-Man / Ms. Pac-Man	Unknown	
October	Jungle King	Pac-Man / Ms. Pac-Man	Unknown	
November	Ms. Pac-Man	Pac-Man / Ms. Pac-Man	Unknown	
December	Ms. Pac-Man	Pac-Man / Ms. Pac-Man	Ms. Pac-Man	
1982	Donkey Kong		Ms. Pac-Man	

=== Best-selling home video games ===
The following titles were 1982's best-selling home video games.

Rank	Title	Platform(s)	Developer	Publisher(s)	Release year	Sales	Revenue	Inflation	Ref
1	Pac-Man	Atari 2600, Coleco Mini Arcade, Nelsonic Game Watch	Namco	Atari, Coleco, Nelsonic	1982	9,271,844	$200,000,000+	$670,000,000+	(Note: Atari VCS version sold 7,271,844 cartridges ($200 million). Coleco's Mini-Arcade version sold 1.5 million units. Nelsonic Game Watch version sold more than 500,000 units.)
2	Donkey Kong	ColecoVision, Atari 2600	Nintendo	Coleco	1982	4,550,000	$100,000,000+	$330,000,000+	(Note: ColecoVision version sold 550,000 cartridges. Atari VCS version sold 4 million cartridges ($100 million).)
3	Frogger	Atari 2600	Konami	Parker Brothers	1982	4,000,000	$80,000,000	$270,000,000	
4	Defender	Atari 2600	Williams	Atari	1982	3,006,790	Unknown		
5	E.T. the Extra-Terrestrial	Atari 2600	Universal	Atari	1982	2,637,985	Unknown		
6	Berzerk	Atari 2600	Atari	Atari, Inc.	1982	1,798,773	Unknown		
7	Space Invaders	Atari 2600	Taito	Atari	1980	1,373,033	Unknown		
8	Asteroids	Atari 2600	Atari	Atari	1981	1,331,956	Unknown		
9	Pitfall!	Atari 2600	Activision	Activision	1982	1,000,000+	Unknown		
10	Microsoft Flight Simulator	IBM PC	Sublogic	Microsoft	1982	800,000+	Unknown		

=== Best-selling home systems ===
Rank	System(s)	Manufacturer	Type	Generation	Sales	Ref
1	Atari 2600	Atari, Inc.	Console	Second	5,100,000	
2	Game & Watch	Nintendo	Handheld	—N/a	4,600,000+	
3	Coleco Mini-Arcade	Coleco	Dedicated	—N/a	3,000,000	
4	Intellivision	Mattel	Console	Second	1,100,000	
5	Timex Sinclair 1000	Timex Sinclair	Computer	8-bit	750,000	
6	Atari 400 / Atari 800	Atari, Inc.	Computer	8-bit	600,000	
6	Commodore 64 / VIC-20	Commodore International	Computer	8-bit	600,000	
6	TI-99/4 / TI-99/4A	Texas Instruments	Computer	16-bit	600,000	
9	ColecoVision	Coleco	Console	Second	550,000	
10	Nelsonic Game Watch	Nelsonic Industries	Handheld	—N/a	500,000+	

== Events ==
- September 25 - The first animated adaptation of a video game, Hanna-Barbera's Pac-Man cartoon, begins airing on ABC.
- December 27 – Starcade, a video game television game show, debuts on TBS in the United States.

=== Major awards ===
- Electronic Games holds the third Arcade Awards, for games released during 1980–1981. Pac-Man wins the best arcade game award, Asteroids (Atari VCS) wins the best console game award, and Star Raiders (Atari 8-bit computers) wins the best computer game award.
- Pac-Man wins the Video Software Dealers Association's VSDA Award for Best Videogame.

== Business ==
- Eidansha Boshu Service Center shortens its name to Enix and in August establishes itself as a computer game publisher.
- New companies:
  - Argonaut
  - Artech
  - Compile
  - Cosmi
  - Data Age
  - Distinctive Software
  - Dragon Data
  - Electronic Arts
  - English Software
  - First Star Software
  - Gamestar
  - Imagine Software
  - Llamasoft
  - Lucasfilm Games
  - Martech
  - MicroProse
  - Richard Shepherd Software
  - System 3
  - Ultimate Play the Game
  - U.S. Games

== Notable releases ==
=== Games ===
==== Arcade ====
- January – Sega releases Zaxxon, which introduces isometric graphics and looks far more 3D than any other raster game at the time.
- January 13 – Midway releases Ms. Pac-Man (despite it being copyrighted as 1981); it is (as the name suggests) the sequel to Pac-Man, but was created without Namco's authorization. They also release Baby Pac-Man and Pac-Man Plus without Namco's authorization later in the year; the former is a pinball/video game hybrid.
- February — Exidy releases Victory (video game)
- April 19 – Namco releases Dig Dug, manufactured by Atari in North America.
- August – Nintendo releases Donkey Kong Jr., the sequel to Donkey Kong.
- August – Taito releases parallax scroller Jungle Hunt.
- September 24 – Namco releases Pole Position, one of the first games with stereophonic and quadraphonic sound. Featuring a pseudo-3D, third-person, rear-view perspective, it becomes the most popular racing game of its time.
- September – Sega releases maze game Pengo, starring a cute penguin.
- October – Namco releases Super Pac-Man, the third title in the Pac-Man series.
- October – Universal releases Mr. Do! solely as a conversion kit, the first game in the series.
- October – Gottlieb releases Q*bert.
- November – Konami releases Time Pilot.
- Bally/Midway releases the Tron arcade game before the movie.
- Atari releases Gravitar which, though extraordinarily difficult, inspires a number of gravity-based home computer games.
- Williams Electronics releases Joust, Robotron: 2084, and the second game of the year with parallax scrolling, Irem's Moon Patrol. Robotron popularizes the twin-stick control scheme for fast action games.
- Data East releases BurgerTime.
- Taito releases Front Line, which creates the blueprint for mid-80s, vertically scrolling, commando games.
- Electro Sport releases Quarter Horse, the first Laserdisc video game.
- Kangaroo is one of the first Donkey Kong-inspired games to become popular in arcades.
- Gottlieb releases Reactor.

==== Console ====
- February – Atari releases Haunted House for the 2600, which is later considered one of the first survival horror games.
- March – Atari's Atari 2600 version of Pac-Man hits stores.
- April – Activision releases Pitfall!, which goes on to sell 4 million copies.
- May – Atari releases Yars' Revenge.
- August – Overlooked arcade games are revitalized as ColecoVision launch titles, including Cosmic Avenger, Mouse Trap, Lady Bug, and Venture.
- October – Atari releases Swordquest: Earthworld, the first title in a planned four-game contest.
- December – Atari releases E.T. the Extra-Terrestrial. Written in five and a half weeks, it's one of the games that sparks the video game crash of 1983.
- Activision releases River Raid, Megamania, Barnstorming, Chopper Command, and Starmaster for the Atari 2600. River Raid becomes one of the all-time bestselling games for the system.
- Starpath releases Dragonstomper (the only RPG for the Atari 2600) and Escape From the Mindmaster.
- Parker Brothers releases Star Wars: The Empire Strikes Back for the Atari 2600, which is the first Star Wars video game.
- Imagic releases Demon Attack, Atlantis, Cosmic Ark, and Dragonfire for the 2600. Atlantis sells over a million copies while Demon Attack doubles that.

==== Computer ====
- March – ASCII Corpation releases the first Japanese adventure game, Omotesandō Adventure
- March 11 – Infocom releases their first non-Zork title, Deadline.
- August 24 – Ultima II: The Revenge of the Enchantress is released.
- November – Microsoft Flight Simulator is released for the IBM Personal Computer. It becomes a standard compatibility test for IBM PC compatibles and launches a long-running series.
- Big Five Software releases the widely ported Miner 2049er, a platform game with ten screens compared to the four of Donkey Kong.
- Broderbund releases Choplifter for the Apple II.
- Edu-Ware releases Prisoner 2 for the Apple II, Atari 8-bit computers, and IBM PC compatibles.
- Koei releases The Dragon and Princess, the earliest known Japanese RPG, for NEC's PC-8001 home computer platform. It is an early example of tactical turn-based combat in the RPG genre.
- Koei releases Night Life, the first erotic computer game (Eroge). The company also released the erotic title, Seduction of the Condominium Wife (団地妻の誘惑, Danchi Tsuma no Yūwaku), which was an early role-playing adventure game with color graphics, owing to the eight-color palette of the PC-8001 computer. It became a hit, helping Koei become a major software company.
- Pony Canyon releases Spy Daisakusen, another early Japanese RPG. Based on the Mission: Impossible franchise, it replaces the traditional fantasy setting with a modern espionage setting.
- Sir-Tech releases Wizardry II: The Knight of Diamonds, the second scenario in the Wizardry series.
- Sierra On-Line releases Time Zone for the Apple II. Written and directed by Roberta Williams, the graphical adventure game shipped with 6 double-sided floppy disks and cost US$99.
- Synapse releases Necromancer and Shamus for the Atari 8-bit computers.
- Hiroyuki Imabayashi's Sokoban is released for the PC-88 and becomes an oft-cloned puzzle game concept.
- Datamost releases the action/adventure game Aztec for the Apple II.
- The Arcade Machine from Broderbund is one of the first general-purpose game creation kits.

=== Hardware ===
==== Arcade ====
- January – Sega releases the Sega Zaxxon, an arcade system board that introduces isometric graphics.
- September – Namco releases the Namco Pole Position, the first arcade system board to use 16-bit microprocessors, with two Zilog Z8002 processors. It is capable of pseudo-3D, sprite-scaling, and displays up to 3840 colors.

==== Console ====
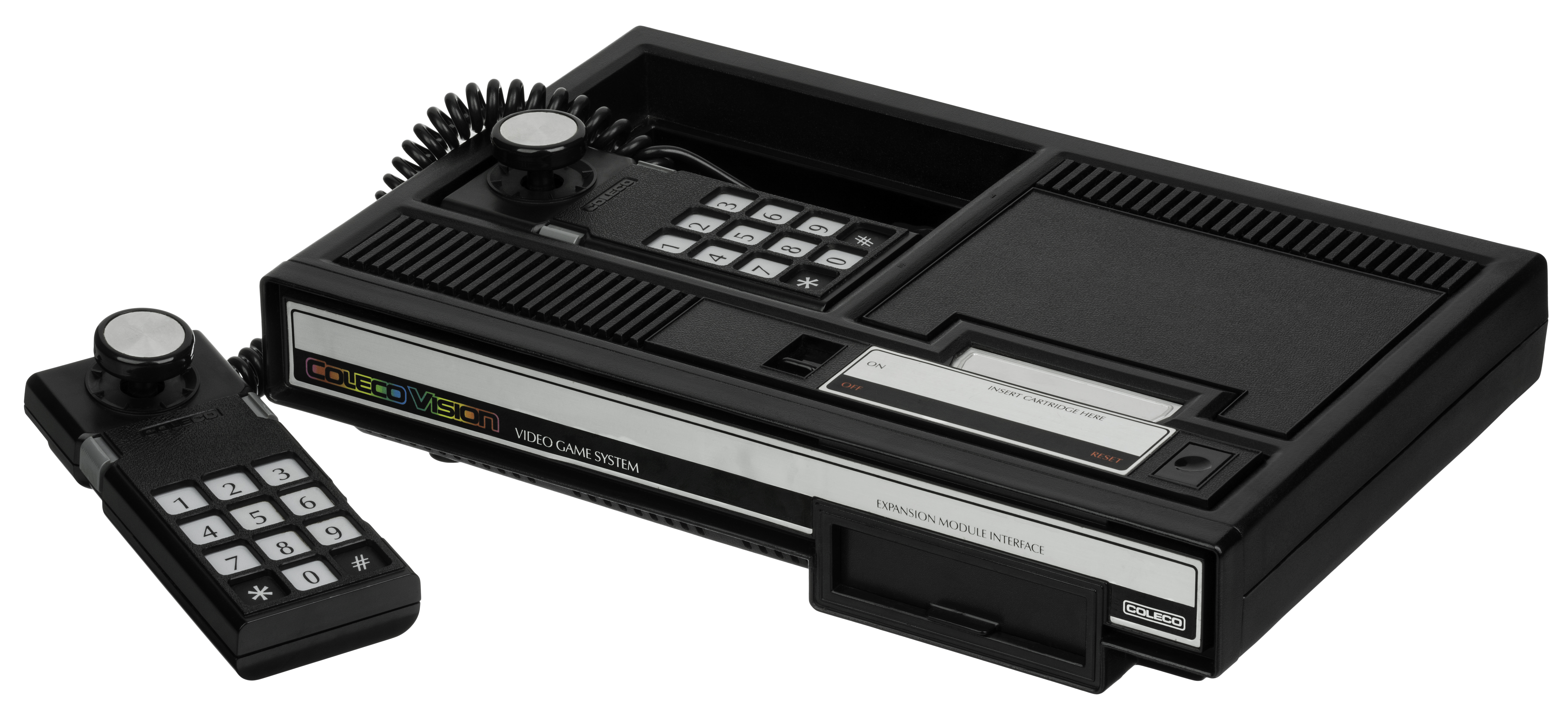
ColecoVision

- May – Emerson releases the Arcadia 2001.
- August – Starpath releases the Starpath Supercharger add-on for the Atari 2600
- August – Coleco launches ColecoVision in North America, the first console with versions of Donkey Kong and Sega's isometric Zaxxon.
- November – General Consumer Electronics releases the Vectrex with built-in vector monitor.
- November – Atari renames the venerable Atari Video Computer System to the Atari 2600.
- Atari releases the Atari 5200, a console based on the hardware of Atari 8-bit computers with analog joysticks and no keyboard.
- Entex releases the Adventure Vision tabletop console.

==== Computer ====
- July – Timex Sinclair releases a modified ZX81 in the US as the TS1000. It's the first sub-$100 home computer.
- Commodore Business Machines releases the Commodore 64 home computer, which would become one of the best-selling computers of all time.
- NEC releases the NEC PC-98, which would become the Japanese market leader and one of the best-selling computers of all time. It is released as the APC overseas.
- Sharp releases the X1.
- Sinclair Research releases the ZX Spectrum home computer, which would become Britain's best-selling computer.
- Dragon Data, initially a subsidiary of Mettoy, releases the Dragon 32 home microcomputer.

== See also ==
- 1982 in games
