= Fireball (video game) =

1982 video game

- Front cover of the Fireball cassette
- Developer: Arcadia/Starpath
- Publisher: Arcadia/Starpath
- Designer: Scott Nelson
- Platform: Atari 2600
- Release: August 1982
- Genre: Action
- Modes: Single-player, multiplayer

Fireball on the Atari 2600

Fireball is a 1982 Breakout clone video game developed by Scott Nelson for the Atari 2600. It was published by Arcadia, whose name changed to "Starpath" during development. Released on cassette tape, the game required the Starpath Supercharger add-on to play. Fireball was one of four launch titles released alongside the add-on, and the only of the four to use the Atari's paddle controllers.

It used the extra memory in the Supercharger to replace Breakout's rectangular "bat" with an animated juggler across five distinct play modes. Fireball received generally positive reviews but was overshadowed by more complex Starpath titles.

== Gameplay ==
Fireball is similar to Breakout in that the player uses a ball (a fireball, hence the name) to break up walls made of bricks by hitting the bricks with the ball, with the shape of the walls changing as the player progresses. Gameplay differs from Breakout, however, in that rather than just being a bat, the player controls an animated juggler who can catch up to two balls (one in each hand) and throw them upward. It also differs from the traditional Breakout format in that six fireballs may be kept in the air at any one time, and the bricks to be destroyed in each level are arranged in varying shapes and patterns. As with Breakout and Circus Atari, Fireball is controlled with a rotary paddle controller. Switches on the Atari console adjust the difficulty by changing the collision detection around the fireballs.

Additional balls can be freed from within blocks, or released onto the screen when the player presses the action button. Scoring is increased by increasing the number of balls in play. If any of the fireballs fall to the bottom of the screen, the juggler is pulled off stage by a vaudeville hook.

Five different modes of play are provided, including "Firetrap", "Knock-a-block", "Marching Blocks", "Migrating Blocks", and "Cascade", and as many as six balls may be on-screen at any given time.

The game modes can be played single-player, or multiplayer where each person takes turns. Up to four players can compete for a high score. Playing the game required both the Starpath Supercharger and a tape recorder to load it into the Supercharger's memory.

== Development ==
Fireball was one of the four 1982 launch titles for the Starpath Supercharger. Starpath, originally named Arcadia, was founded by former Atari Director of Research Bob Brown and former Atari engineer Craig Nelson. The 1977 Atari VCS game console was limited compared to the consoles and lower-end home computers that were released up to 1982, but it remained the market leader. The Supercharger plugged into the Atari VCS cartridge slot and loaded games from inexpensive cassette tapes (similar to early home computers) into its over 6,000 bytes of random access memory (RAM), a significant jump from the console's internal 128 bytes. Because each Atari game "paints" its graphics onto the screen in sync with the electron beam of a tube television, the low system RAM caused many Atari games to draw graphical elements at half the machine's vertical resolution. Starpath's titles like Fireball were written to use the full resolution of the console.

Fireball was coded by Craig Nelson's brother Scott. His follow-up title for Starpath's Supercharger, Sweat, was canceled after the North American video game crash of 1983. Epyx bought out Starpath, and Scott Nelson reworked his second game into Summer Games. All of Starpath's games were coded by individual designers on Apple II home computers. According to fellow Starpath developer Dennis Caswell, they tested games using a "rather crude (but still useful) debugging hardware" as well as downloading games straight from the computers to a Supercharger via audio cable.

== Release ==
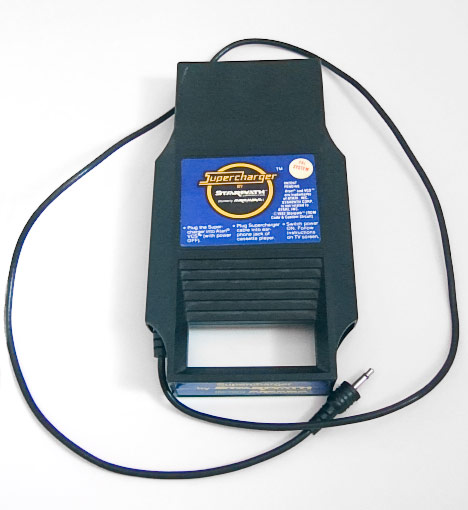
Starpath's Supercharger with cable

Starpath released their add-on along with several launch titles in fall 1982. Fireball and the other games were released on cassettes that year and into 1983. It was sold on cassette tapes costing roughly 40% the cost of Atari's own contemporary releases. Starpath used the extra space on the cassettes to include non-playable demos of their other games. Starpath collapsed in late 1983 and was acquired by Epyx.

Fireball was re-released twice on audio CD-ROM as part of the Stella Gets a New Brain collection. The first release in the late 1990s included all of the Starpath titles. The second release also included all Starpath titles, but also added playable prototypes including the never released Polo developed by Carol Shaw.

== Reception ==
The contemporary reception was generally positive. The British TV Gamer magazine described it as "very similar to other Breakout games" though they also called it "challenging and entertaining". In a 1983 Miami Herald review entitled "Fireball is not hot enough", Rick Vogt gave it a rating of "B" both for children and for adult players. The German TeleMatch magazine gave it a positive review, praising its gameplay as an evolution of similar games going back to Pong and Fireball's detailed graphics, while criticising its "monoton [monotonous]" sound effects. Vidiot magazine described it as "the best variation on the Breakout theme yet". Phil Wiswell, writing for the December 1982 issue of Games, selected Fireball as one of the top games for the VCS. The 1984 Software Encyclopedia was broadly positive, giving it 7/10.

Many reviews framed Fireball in comparison to existing block-breaking games. Antic said it was "similar to Breakout". Games Magazine described some modes as comparable to Atari's sequel Super Breakout, but with an "unusual twist". Video Game Update described the "Knock-A-Block" mode as only a slow-moving "fair" Breakout derivative, and the "Cascade" mode as good, but did not recommend purchasing the tape. At the Logical Gamer, editor Alan Bechtold said that Fireball was an improvement on Breakout, but Mike Wilson didn't recommend it "considering all the other video game challenges" available at the time. TV Gamer described it as a "collection of Breakout type games" with better graphics and praised the game with the caveat that it was not worth buying a Supercharger and tape player just for Fireball. In 1983, Computer and Video Games magazine suggested buying a Supercharger to play its more complex titles Escape from the Mindmaster and Dragonstomper, but described Fireball as only a "reasonably good ... break out type game". Both those Starpath titles received industry awards, while Fireball did not. In addition to Breakout and its sequel, Creative Computing compared it to Innovative Design's Juggler for the Apple II, and noted that the separate play modes amounted to separate games with shared assets. In his book 100 Greatest Console Video Games, Bret Weiss compared the gameplay to Circus Atari as well.

Later reviewers have been more positive about Fireball. In Classic Home Video Games, 1972-1984: A Complete Reference Guide, Weiss described the in-game action as "fun, hectic, and more than a little challenging". Writing for Atari HQ, Iida Keita also gave Fireball a positive review, describing it as "very derivative and familiar to most classic videogame enthusiasts" whilst also saying that "the design does provide for some challenging and exciting play".
