= Tron: Solar Sailer =

1983 video game

- Developer(s): Mattel Electronics
- Publisher(s): Mattel Electronics
- Designer(s): Keith Robinson; Don Daglow
- Programmer(s): Keith Robinson; Gene Smith
- Artist(s): Keith Robinson
- Composer(s): Andy Sells
- Series: Tron
- Platform(s): Intellivision
- Release: February 1983
- Genre(s): Action
- Mode(s): Single-player

Tron: Solar Sailer is a 1983 action video game developed and published by Mattel Electronics for the Intellivision. It is the third of three Intellivision games based on the 1982 Disney film Tron, and was one of four for the console that required the Intellivoice module, along with Space Spartans, B-17 Bomber, and Bomb Squad.

== Gameplay ==
The game begins by giving the player a code. The player then progresses to a grid-like area with spiders and tanks, which hinder the player with melee and ranged attacks. Although enemies may be fired upon, doing so quickly drains the player's energy. Therefore, avoiding contact and dodging shots is often the most efficient way of navigating the grid. After reaching the correct sector, the player may enter the code to move on.

== Bibliography ==
- Videogaming and Computer Gaming Illustrated, July 1983, p. 35
- Electronic Fun with Computers & Games, July 1983, pp. 58–59
- Videogiochi, Oct 1984, pp. 66–68
- TV Gamer, March 1984, p. 56
- Joystick, May 1984, p. 12
