= London Blitz (video game) =

1983 video game

- Atari 2600 box art
- Developer: Avalon Hill
- Publisher: Avalon Hill
- Programmers: Rebecca Heineman; William J. Sheppard
- Platforms: Atari 2600, Commodore 64
- Release: Atari 2600; June 1983; Commodore 64; November 1984
- Genre: Maze
- Mode: Single-player

London Blitz is a first-person maze video game created by Avalon Hill and released in 1983 for the Atari 2600. It was later ported to the Commodore 64. Players take the role of a British Royal Engineer, scouring London for bombs to defuse during the London Blitz. It was an early work of then sixteen year old, Rebecca Heineman, who taught Avalon Hill staff how to code for the 2600. It was later completed by William J. Sheppard.

Most reviewers gave London Blitz glowing reviews, except for Electronic Games which called the game a "dud". Many reviewers complemented the visuals, especially the animations which one reviewer called poetic and "faintly stroboscopic." It is frequently compared to Starpath's Escape from the Mindmaster and Mattel's Bomb Squad.

== Gameplay ==
London Blitz is a first-person maze game where the player takes the role of a British Army Royal Engineer during the London Blitz. The player navigates a maze to locate and disarm bombs placed all over London. Play takes place on three screens: the map screen where the entire maze is seen from a bird's eye perspective, the movement screen where the maze is traversed in first person, and the bomb defusal screen. Player start by selecting a bomb to traverse to on the map screen, before traveling their on the movement screen. Players can swap between the two screens at any time with the action button.

Once a bomb has been found, players reach the third screen displaying its interworkings. Three knobs can be moved left and right to attempt to produce the correct combination to defuse the bomb. Upon submitting a potential combination, players receive lights which indicate whether the knobs need to be moved left, right, or are in the correct position. Once diffusal is complete, players are sent back to the map to find another one. Players have a limited amount of time to defuse each bomb. There are also other types of bombs that require extra challenge to defuse.

== Development & release ==
After winning a national Atari 2600 Space Invaders competition, Rebecca Heineman was contacted by multiple publications including Electronic Games. When she mentioned that she had reversed engineered the Atari 2600, she was put in contact with Avalon Hill who brought her in as a consultant. She was 16 at the time. Avalon Hill had a long history publishing tabletop wargames and strategy board games, they were also already a major publisher of computer strategy games.

Heineman wrote a user manual, built much of the underlying code, and wrote some early prototypes for London Blitz. She left the company before any of Avalon's 2600 games were shipped. The final game credits programmer William J. Sheppard in its manual. Avalon Hill announced its first Atari 2600 games including London Blitz, Death Trap, and Wall Ball in May 1983. The game shipped in June. In 1984, Avalon announced a conversion to the Commodore 64, which shipped in November.

== Reception ==
The Video Game Update called London Blitz an outstanding game with good graphics. They especially highlighted the movement screen which they said was "of a quality not seen before on an enhanced Atari 2600." They also liked the Commodore 64 version, saying "it's one of those that can be played for hours without boredom setting in." Compute!'s Gazette in reviewing the Commodore 64 version said "you'll find London Blitz to be one of the most absorbing computer games in your collection." Electronic Games, on the other hand, called it a "dud" and not a great showing for Avalon Hill. They thought the graphics were "eye-pleasing" but the gameplay "little more than a hit-or-miss guessing game." JoyStik magazine claimed the movement sections take a bit of practice due to the joyticks being too sensitive but that the graphics were "outstanding." They gave it four out of four stars.

In Videogaming and Computer Gaming Illustrated, Jim Clark mused that "a good deal of thought, craft, and care have gone into this game." He thought the graphics didn't compare to the similar first-person maze game Escape from the Mindmaster and the bomb defusal wasn't as complicated as in Bomb Squad, but that it was "poetically animated" and "faintly stroboscopic." E.C. Meade agreed with Clark but added that maze navigation was "clumsy and irritating." Both Mike Wilson and Alan R. Bechtold of The Logical Gamer recommended the game and believed it was a good demonstration of Avalon Hill's talents. Wilson thought the graphics weren't impressive but still well defined and clear and the sound "doesn't make you want to pull your hair out." Brett Weiss in 2007 said "the graphics are redundant, but the scrolling is smooth, and the first person perspective works well."
