= Phaser Patrol =

1982 video game

- Developer: Starpath
- Publisher: Starpath
- Designer: Dennis Caswell
- Platform: Atari 2600
- Release: NA: 1982
- Genre: Space combat simulator
- Mode: Single-player

Phaser Patrol,designed by Dennis Caswell, is the first numbered release by Arcadia for the Atari 2600 and the pack-in game for the Atari 2600 Supercharger accessory in 1982. The company changed its name to Starpath after launch, and the hardware was rebranded the Starpath Supercharger.

The game simulates space combat in which the player pilots a ship to destroy Dracon invaders. It is largely a clone of Star Raiders for the Atari 8-bit computers.

== Gameplay ==
The sector map of locations the player can travel to

== Reception ==
BYTE called Phaser Patrol an "addictive" game that has a combination of skill and strategy. Danny Goodman of Creative Computing Video & Arcade Games praised the high resolution of the game's instrument panel as an example of the Supercharger's excellent graphics.

The game was a runner-up in the category of "Best Video Game Audiovisual Effects" at the 4th annual Arkie Awards.
