= Intellivoice =

Voice synthesizer adapter for the Intellivision video game system

Intellivoice Voice Synthesis Module

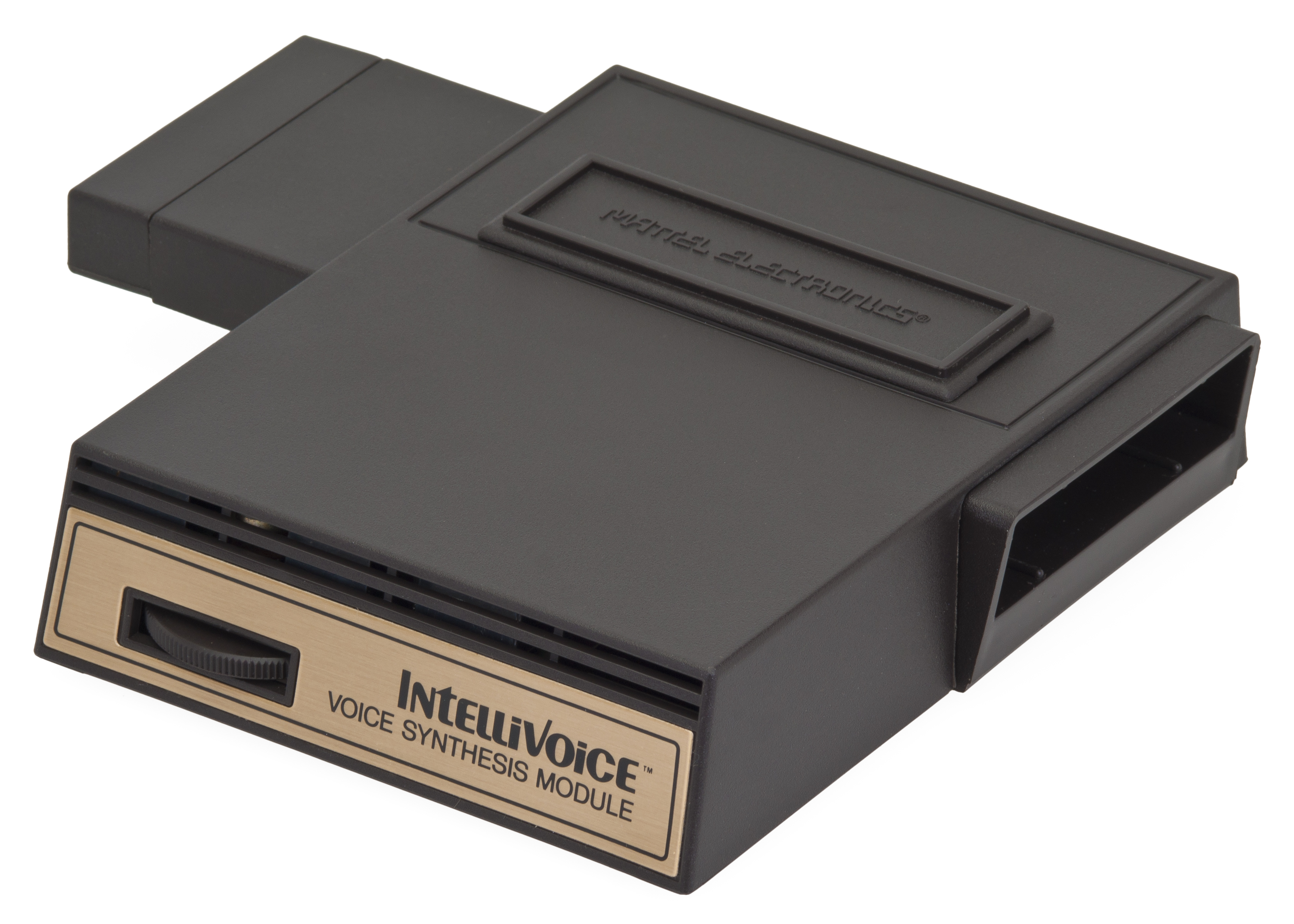
- Manufacturer: Mattel Electronics
- Type: Add-on
- Generation: Second generation
- Released: 1982
- Lifespan: 1982-1983
- Discontinued: 1983
- Media: ROM cartridge

The Intellivoice Voice Synthesis Module, commonly abbreviated as Intellivoice, is an adapter for the Intellivision, Mattel's home video game console, that utilizes a voice synthesizer to generate audible speech. The Intellivoice is a large, brown cartridge that plugs into the Intellivision's side-mounted cartridge slot; games specifically designed for the device can then be inserted into a slot provided on the right-hand side of the module.

An international version of the Intellivoice was planned, but never released. The Intellivoice was discontinued in 1983 due to poor sales, with only five titles released with support for the device. Despite this, it has been called an important innovation in gaming, since the Intellivoice software used speech as an important gameplay element.

== Development ==
In the late 1970s and early 1980s, General Instrument, like nearly every microelectronics manufacturer, was rolling out their own series of microprocessors and support chips in hopes of gaining a share of the then-new and rapidly exploding market for increasingly sophisticated consumer and industrial electronics. One of the peripheral and support chips introduced for G.I.'s microprocessors was the SP0256 Narrator speech synthesizer chip. Since the Intellivision was based on General Instrument's CP1610 microprocessor and support chips, and talking electronic products (such as Texas Instruments' Speak & Spell) had already captured the public's fascination, Mattel Electronics decided to develop an add-on speech-synthesis module for the console. Engineer Ron Carlson was put in charge of designing a device capable of utilizing the chip. Programmer Ron Surratt was hired to write the software for the module, and Patrick Jost would analyze the voice data for the device.

The Narrator had 2 KB of read-only memory (ROM), and this was utilized to store a database of generic words that could be combined to make phrases in Intellivision games. The words included numbers, "press", "enter", "and", "or", and "Mattel Electronics Presents" in a generic male voice. These phrases (as well as the speech for the first game, Space Spartans) were recorded and digitized by Carlson and Jost at General Instrument's facility in New York, and the resulting data was turned into a mask so that a customized version of the SP0256 could be manufactured with the generic phrases permanently stored inside the chip. Since the Orator chip could also accept speech data from external memory, any additional words or phrases needed for specific games could be stored inside the game cartridge itself.

According to Ron Surratt, when he first received Carlson & Jost's data from G.I.'s New York facility and loaded it into the prototype unit, all the device would do was repeat "Auk yooo! Auk yooo!" repeatedly to the Mattel executives and marketing personnel who had come to see the demonstration. This led to several heated phone calls between Hawthorne and New York, and considerable finger-pointing between the hardware and software camps until the problem was found.

Once the bugs were resolved, Mattel Electronics committed itself to producing voice games and built a state-of-the-art voice lab at their Hawthorne, California facility to do the recording and digitization on site.

=== International Intellivoice ===
This unit would have contained additional internal ROMs with the built-in "generic" library of words translated into French, German, and Italian, and would have been sold along with appropriately translated versions of the Intellivoice titles into those markets. While at least two prototypes were known to have been built, and translated versions of Space Spartans were programmed, neither they nor the International Intellivoice were ever released.

=== Intellivoice II ===
A restyled version of the Intellivoice module, designed to match the "white brick" style of the redesigned Intellivision II Master Component, appeared in the 1983 Intellivision catalog. However, no such restyled module was ever actually produced, not even as a prototype; the module seen in the catalog is simply a carved and painted block of wood.

== Market failure ==
After testing Intellivoice games at the summer 1982 Consumer Electronics Show, Danny Goodman of Creative Computing Video & Arcade Games stated that the peripheral was "exciting" because "the initial games designed for it have made the voice an integral part of game play", unlike the Magnavox Odyssey²'s voice module. The device was brought to the public in 1982 with an initial lineup of 3 games: Space Spartans, Bomb Squad, and B-17 Bomber. Despite critical acclaim, the Intellivoice did not sell nearly as well as Mattel had hoped; while initial orders were as high as 300,000 units for the module and its associated games, most of them just sat on retailers' shelves. Even a promotional giveaway of a free Intellivoice by mail with the purchase of an Intellivision Master Component failed to kick-start sales of the Intellivoice game titles; the fourth Intellivoice game release, Tron: Solar Sailer, sold 90,000 units.

There were several issues that contributed to the system's failure in the marketplace:

- The digitized voice data required a great deal of ROM space; as much as, or even more than, the game itself. At the time, these larger ROMs were much more expensive to produce, and so the Intellivoice-supporting titles ended up retailing for much more than a standard Intellivision game; while standard non-voice titles typically debuted at $39.95, then quickly dropped to around $20 – $25 as new titles were released, Intellivoice titles retailed for as much as $45 apiece and were much slower to drop in price.
- The Intellivoice itself was a costly add-on, debuting at around $100, and rarely selling for less than $80. Though the Intellivoice package was bundled with a game (B-17 Bomber), this was considered a high initial investment.
- Due to the limits on the amount of ROM space that could be put inside a cartridge, words had to be digitized at the lowest possible sampling rate at which they could still be understood, and it wasn't unusual for the sampling rate to be changed three or four times within the same word (lower rates for vowels, higher for consonants) to save space. This tended to give the voice a distinctly mechanical, unnatural sound.
- No third-party games supported the Intellivoice. This was partly due to the difficulty of producing voice data for the Orator chip (since the data consisted of strings of analog-filter coefficients to modify the behavior of the chip's synthetic vocal-tract model, rather than simple digitized samples, the process was somewhat complex and required considerable support from G.I.), and partly due to the lack of information on how the Intellivoice module worked since Mattel, like most other game-console manufacturers of the day, did not want third parties to be able to compete with them by producing games for their systems.

In August 1983, all personnel related to Intellivoice game and hardware development were laid off, and development on all further Intellivoice games was halted except for two: Space Shuttle, and World Series Major League Baseball. Space Shuttle, a NASA space mission simulator, continued development for a time, but was eventually cancelled for being "too much simulation and not enough game". World Series Major League Baseball, however, was completed as part of the initial round of games produced for the Entertainment Computer System add-on module, making it the final game produced with Intellivoice support. Unlike the other four Intellivoice games, WSMLB didn't actually require the use of the Intellivoice in order to play; the game was merely "voice enhanced" for those Intellivision owners who happened to have both the ECS and Intellivoice modules.

== Games ==
A total of five games were released for the Intellivoice:

- Space Spartans
- Bomb Squad
- B-17 Bomber
- Tron: Solar Sailer
- Intellivision World Series Baseball
