= Dragonstomper =

- Developer: Starpath
- Publisher: Starpath
- Designer: Stephen Landrum
- Platform: Atari 2600
- Release: Late 1982 or early 1983
- Genre: Role-playing
- Mode: Single-player

Dragonstomper is a video game developed by Stephen Landrum for the Atari Video Computer System (later renamed Atari 2600) and released by Starpath. The game follows the adventures of a dragon hunter who is given a quest by the king to defeat a dragon and reclaim a magical amulet that was stolen. The player makes their way over the countryside, vanquishing various adversaries and gaining gold and experience. After achieving enough strength, the player can enter a shop in an oppressed village where equipment can be purchased, soldiers hired, and special scrolls obtained to defeat the dragon in its lair.

Stating that he wanted to make a "real fantasy role-playing game", Landrum began developing the game under the title of Excalibur. The game required use of the Starpath Supercharger, which connected to the Atari 2600 in order for it to read a cassette tape. The device also increased the RAM capabilities of the Atari 2600 exponentially, allowing for more complex games or graphics for the system. Upon the game's release, it received praise from gaming publications such as Electronic Games and Computer and Video Games with critics commenting on the game's depth and comparing its quality to home computer games of the period; Games listed it among the best games of 1983. Retrospective reviews included Chris Cavanaugh writing for the online database AllGame calling the game "woefully overlooked", and Ed Lin of Forbes praising the game for its graphics, use of music, and multiple ways to solve problems.

== Plot and gameplay ==
Dragonstomper is set in a sword and sorcery–themed world. It takes place in a kingdom where a king once ruled peacefully. After a druid magician enchanted a powerful amulet which he believed would subdue a dragon, they entered the dragon's cave and accidentally left the amulet to fall into the hands of the dragon, increasing its power. The creature used its newfound powers against the kingdom, causing crops to die and creating savage creatures across the land. With the king's knights vanquished by the dragon's warriors, the Dragonstomper was the only person left to restore the kingdom. The Dragonstomper travels through the countryside and a township to prepare themselves to battle the dragon. The ending features different ways, chosen by the player, to deal with the dragon.

The Dragonstomper represented by the small white square being stopped by a guard near a bridge. The text interface and menu options are displayed at the bottom of the screen.

John Harris of Game Developer described the game as a role-playing game; like most games in the genre in the early 1980s, it adhered closely to the template established by Dungeons & Dragons. Michael J. Tresca wrote in his book on the history of role-playing games that it was the only true role-playing game on the Atari 2600. The game is set in three different in-game areas: The Enchanted Countryside, The Oppressed Village, and The Dragon's Cave. In the countryside, the objective is to gain power and magic needed to enter the village, with the Dragonstomper battling enemies in the field to be able to have enough gold to pass the guard at the bridge. The use of each item in this area is randomized each play, such as gaining strength and dexterity, losing half your strength, losing dexterity, or revealing traps on the playing field. Items found in the village all retain their abilities each playthrough, such as vitamins restoring strength or medicine that can cure poisoning.

Enemies are met as random encounters. Each battle in the game can lower the player's strength; when this reaches zero, the game is over. Strength is regained over time during the game. Battling is turn-based and done through an in-game text menu choosing to fight, using a magic spell, use weapons, or attempt to flee from the battle. Once within the village, the user can buy items and recruit other warriors to aid in the final battle before entering the dragon's cave.

== Development ==
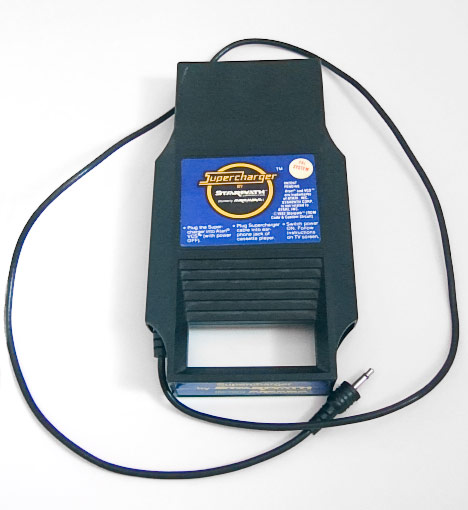
The Starpath Supercharger (pictured) was required to play Dragonstomper on the Atari 2600.

Dragonstomper was created by Stephen Landrum for Arcadia, later rebranded as Starpath. The game was made for a peripheral for the Atari 2600 called the Starpath Supercharger, which allowed for the system to operate through cassette tapes. It was developed in Santa Clara, California, by ex-Atari Director of Research Bob Brown and ex-Atari development engineer Craig Nelson. The system allowed for 6 kilobytes of RAM, while the Atari 2600 had only 128 bytes built into the system. The Supercharger plugged into the cartridge slot of the system and loaded games from audio cassettes by connecting an audio cable on the side of the cartridges to the earphone jack of an external tape player.

Landrum worked for Arcadia/Starpath from March 1981 to November 1983, creating games like Communist Mutants From Space and a port of Frogger as well as completing the code for Suicide Mission. Dragonstomper was developed under the name Excalibur. Landrum stated that the game took several months to develop and chose to make it a role-playing game, as he felt nobody had yet made a "real" fantasy role-playing game on the Atari 2600. Like all the Supercharger games made by the company, they were developed on Apple II computers. By 1982, the Atari 2600 use of music was primarily functional in nature and was mostly for intros to games and in-game events. Dragonstomper features music such as "Rule, Britannia" when completing the game, "Taps" when the player dies, and "The Gold Diggers' Song (We're in the Money)" when gold is found.

== Release ==
The exact release date of Dragonstomper is unknown. Under the title Excalibur, it was initially planned for release in October 1982. The Supercharger itself was available in 1982 in major department stores and would start distribution in specialty stores in 1983, and syndicated columnist Michael Blanchet noted the game had been released in a November 26, 1982, newspaper article. A January 1983 issue of Software Merchandising announced Mindmaster and Dragonstomper among Starpath's upcoming releases.

In the liner notes of Stella Gets a New Brain, a compilation of Starpath Supercharger games on compact disc, Dragonstomper was stated to have been released in 1983. Plans were made to have Dragonstomper available for Atari 8-bit computers by May or June 1983 and the ColecoVision console for September 1983. By January 1984, Starpath was no longer in business and was acquired by Epyx. The game was re-released on compact disc with other Supercharger games in the 1990s from a team organized on the rec.games.video.classic Usenet newsgroup. The CD version required an Atari 2600 and Supercharger adapter to play the games.

== Reception ==
=== Contemporary reviews ===
Contemporary reviews of the game praised the game's sophistication for a console game, comparing it to the quality of home computer games of the period. The Electronic Games 1983 Software Encyclopedia praised the games graphics and sound as "excellent" and its gameplay as "outstanding", noting that "clever design makes it possible to enter all necessary commands through the joystick" and that the game's on-screen menu cut memorization of instructions "to a blessed minimum". The same review was published in the 1984 version but lowering the score to a seven. "B.H." of Games stated that the game was "the most sophisticated adventure game we've seen from any home video system" and that, along with Escape from the Mindmaster, it raised the Atari 2600 to "virtually the level of a home computer".

Other reviews focused on its quality and hailed it as among the best games using the Supercharger, while a few disliked the slower pace and graphics. Mike Meyers of the video game magazine Blip declared that although the game was difficult to master, he ultimately declared Dragonstomper to be best of the supercharger games and "probably the best 'swords and sorcery' game yet produced for a home video game system." An anonymous author in Computer and Video Games also proclaimed it the best of the current Supercharger games in July 1983 and that the game "should be enough to keep even the most skilled adventurer occupied for a very long time". In the UK publication TV Gamer noted that text in the game made it "one of the most striking things about it" and that with Dragonstomper the "supercharger definitely comes into its own". One reviewer in Videogaming and Computer Gaming Illustrated declared it superior to Intellivision's Advanced Dungeons & Dragons and properly captured the spirit of Dungeons & Dragons while noting that the complexity and slow pace may be off-putting to some gamers. A second reviewer declared that "no one on this planet can be more bored with this video game than I was", finding it annoying to let the game choose the player's fate, noting they had preferred the fantasy-themed game Adventure (1980). Both reviewers negatively commented on the game's graphics. Dan Persons wrote in Video Games that graphics and sound in Dragonstomper were merely "ordinary" but that it "happens to be one of the best adventure games released for the 2600". Persons complimented the controls, finding that the system was well laid out for navigating the menus and almost as good as using a keyboard. He concluded his review stating that "the booby traps in the dragon's cave are sprung with such a suddenness that I literally jumped from my seat. A nicely wicked touch."

The game was included in Games magazine's list of the Best New Games of 1983; the publication praised the game for its depth and were surprised to find it on a console as opposed to a home computer. The magazine Video Games Player awarded Dragonstomper the "Adventure Game of the Year" in the home video games category for their Golden Joystick Awards for 1983.

=== Retrospective reviews ===
Later reviews continued to praise the game, again comparing its quality to home computer titles of the era and the variety of gameplay. Joe Santulli and Liz Santulli of the Digital Press declared it "one of the greatest games ever for the 2600" and that it "really shows off the Atari 2600's potential", respectively. Chris Cavanaugh, writing for the online database AllGame, gave the game a five-star rating (out of five) opining that Dragonstomper was a "woefully overlooked" and "surprisingly deep and ambitious RPG" and that the "wonder of Dragonstomper lies in the magnitude and variety of its environments, which provide a depth of gameplay usually reserved for home computer titles of this genre".

Ed Lin, writing for Forbes, praised the game's innovative graphics and music cues and that it contained multiple ways to solve problems. Brett Alan Weiss included the game in his book The 100 Greatest Console Video Games, 1977-1987 (2014), declaring it as a sophisticated role-playing game for its time noting its variety in problem-solving and randomized monsters as well as having a good interface.

== See also ==
- History of Western role-playing video games
- List of Atari 2600 games
- List of role-playing video games: 1975 to 1985
- Video game crash of 1983
