= Rabbit Transit =

Rabbit Transit may refer to:

- rabbittransit, the public bus service that operates in Pennsylvania and Maryland
- Rabbit Transit (film), a 1947 Looney Tunes cartoon
- Rabbit Transit (game), an Atari 2600 game based on the Looney Tunes cartoon
