= Bomb squad (disambiguation) =

Bomb squad most often refers to a team specialised in bomb disposal.

Bomb squad may also refer to:

- Bomb Squad, a former name of Suburban Legends, an American ska punk band
- Bomb Squad (video game), for the Intellivision game system
- BombSquad, a video game developed by Eric Froemling for Windows, OUYA, Android, Linux and macOS.
- The Bomb Squad, an American hip hop production team
