= Party Mix =

Party mix is a snack mix served at parties or other social gatherings. Party Mix also refers to:

- Party Mix!, an EP by The B-52's
- Party Mix (video game), a Starpath Supercharger game for the Atari 2600
