= Sword of Saros =

1983 video game

- Developer: Starpath
- Publisher: Starpath
- Programmers: Jon Leupp; Stephen Landrum
- Platform: Atari 2600
- Release: NA: 1983
- Genre: Action-adventure game
- Mode: Single-player

Sword of Saros on Atari 2600

Sword of Saros is an action-adventure game for the Atari 2600 equipped with the Starpath Supercharger peripheral. The game was only sold via mail order by Starpath and few copies were made. It was programmed by Jon Leupp and Stephen Landrum.

== Gameplay ==
The objective is to explore the evil wizard's maze-like dungeon to find the pieces of the Sword of Saros. The wizard sends bats to find the player; when successful, the wizard teleports to the player's location and sends waves of skeletons to attack. Helpful magical items can be found in the world.
