= Escape from the Mindmaster =

1982 video game

Escape From the Mindmaster
- Cover art
- Developer: Starpath
- Publisher: Starpath
- Designer: Dennis Caswell
- Platform: Atari 2600
- Release: November 1982
- Genre: Maze
- Mode: Single-player

Escape from the Mindmaster is a 1982 maze video game developed and published by Starpath. The game was designed by Dennis Caswell. The game features the a first-person perspective as the navigate six mazes. The player must search the mazes avoiding the wandering creature the Alien Invader and the moving barriers. Their goal is to escape each of the six mazes by finding the differently shaped puzzle pegs and place them in their corresponding slots in as fast as time as possible.

The game was designed for the Atari 2600 video game console and is played through the Starpath Supercharger add-on. The hardware increased the potential memory for games for the system. Caswell said he did not recall how he came up with the idea for the Escape from the Mindmaster, but said that he wanted to make a game without any shooting gameplay mechanics and that programming the visuals were particularly difficult.

Reviews from video game magazines such as Electronic Fun with Computers & Games, JoyStik and Video Games praised the graphics in the game. While some reviews complimented it as an original maze game, others publications such as Videogaming and Computer Gaming Illustrated and JoyStik said the controls were difficult to learn and the game may not hold the attention of players looking for more action-oriented gameplay respectively. The game would appear in year-end best-of lists from the Fort Worth Star-Telegram and Radio-Electronics. It would later appears in best video games of all time lists from Electronic Fun with Computers & Games in 1984 and Flux in 1995.

== Plot and gameplay ==
In Escape From the Mindmaster, the player has been abducted from their home and finds them in a giant corridor with no obvious escape. It dawns on them that they are subject of an experiment that test their intelligence, coordination and reflexes.

Escape From the Mindmaster has been described as a first-person maze game. It contains six mazes. Through each maze, players can find various shapes called "puzzle pegs", such as squares and circles, and their correspondingly shaped holes where they belong. The player can pick up one shape at a time and place them at their respectively shaped holes. The location of both the shape and their corresponding hole change location in the maze with each playthrough. Each maze has a door to the next maze. This door stays locked until all the pegs are in their proper holes. A time also counts down the scores every few seconds, with the final total of this score being added after the player escapes a maze.

Gameplay from Escape from the Mindmaster. The bottom of the screen shows a layout of the maze and an arrow showing which direction the player is currently facing.

On the bottom of the screen, a display shows what puzzle peg they are holding, a map of the maze, and an arrow showing what direction the player is facing and the number of lives a player has in the game. Also wandering the maze is the Alien Stalker. It cannot be defeated and must be avoided as bumping into it makes the player lose a life. The player can sense when the Alien Stalker is near, as it can be heard audibly through an alert sounding.

From the second maze onwards, the player will encounter forcefields that appear as sliding square panels. Making contact with these panels makes the player lose a life. From the fourth maze onwards, some doors only are one-way. The games within Escape From the Mindmaster feature five different mini-games. These games feature various memory and reflex-based challenges. Completing these games effects the score of the game.

On completing the mazes, the Mindmaster ranks the player based on their score.

== Development and release ==
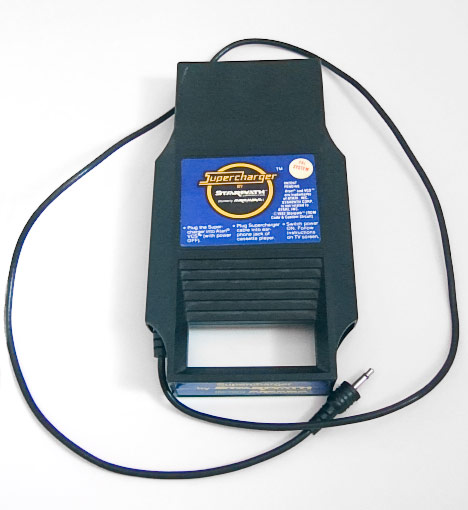
The Starpath Supercharger hardware is required to play Escape From the Mindmaster on the Atari 2600.

Escape from the Mindmaster was developed by Starpath, a company based in Santa Clara, California. It was created by Dennis Caswell. Caswell said he was hired by Starpath to develop Atari 2600 games as he had his own Apple II computer and they were impressed with his skills in the arcade game Crazy Climber (1980).

Escape From the Mindmaster was designed for use with Starpath's Supercharger add-on for the Atari 2600. The supercharger allows a game to contain up to 6,272 bytes of memory for screen display compares the 128 of regular Atari games. Escape from the Mindmaster was among the 12 games Starpath would release for the Supercharger. Caswell said he did not recall where he got the idea for the game, but said he was motivated by the idea of creating a video game that did not have any shooting gameplay. Caswell added that he was not against violent games, saying "One of the last games that I played all the way through before removing myself from the gaming world was Quake, and I played it with as much relish as the next bloodthirsty savage."

Reviewers in Computer Games magazine described that along with Milton Bradley's Survival Run, Escape from the Mindmaster as being part of current trend in maze games where the maze is presented in 3D and has a first-person point of view. Caswell described the first-person perspective as being a benefit as it avoided him having to display a human player onscreen. He said that programming the game for the Atari 2600 proved to be a challenge. This led to challenges regarding programming the game to have walls with smooth edges which would have otherwise appeared more blocky. Other elements led to not having the alien character and the sliding panels appears on the same screens.

== Release ==
Escape From the Mindmaster was released in November 1982 for the Atari 2600. Escape From the Mindmaster was re-released by Cyberpunks as part of the compilation of the Supercharger games titled Stella Gets a New Brain released in 1996.

The game was set for release for the ColecoVision in 1983 but went unreleased. Reviews of the ColecoVision version of the game said it included all the content from the original. A reviewer in Electronic Fun with Computers & Games said this version contained "flickery VCS graphics have been cleaned up somewhat" and the "direction indicator has been slightly redesigned." The maps in the game were changed so the player must explore every corridor before getting a complete map. A version of the ColecoVision version of the game was discovered in what Brett Weiss, author of The 100 Greatest Console Video Games, 1977-1987 (2014), described as "apparently complete" version.

By January 1984, Starpath was no longer in business and was acquired by Epyx. Caswell would create one game for Epyx with Impossible Mission (1984) for the Commodore 64. He spoke positively about being able to work on it after a handful of Atari 2600 games. Following these games Caswell created a few educational games and his final game Battle Bugs (1994). He left the video game development after to work in the aviation industry.

== Reception ==
Reception

Review scores
Publication	Score	
Publication	Atari 2600	ColecoVision
The Book of Atari Software 1984	B+	
Computer Games		A
Electronic Fun with Computers & Games	3.5/4	4/4
JoyStik	3/5	

From contemporary reviews of the game, video game magazines Electronic Fun with Computers & Games, JoyStik and Video Games complimented the graphics. Dan Persons, of the latter magazine, specifically highlight that they convincingly gave the illusion of depth and perspective as well as moving through the corridors. Phil Wiswell, also of Video Games, praised the graphics but said that it led him to expect more in terms of gameplay.

Wiswell found that the game should have had more action gameplay to complement the graphics. Similar comments appeared in JoyStik and from Persons who said that "fans of action games may find Escape from the Mindmaster a little disappointing." Jim Clark in Videogaming and Computer Gaming Illustrated said the game was "highly recommended" and that it was "a welcome change of pace for maze games dominated with "chasing and gobbling" for years." Danny Goodman of Radio-Electronics echoed this, saying the game had "far more board variety than possible from any other existing ROM-based cartridge."

While Persons found the controls "simple and straightforward" with the assistance of the direction indicator and mini-map, E.C. Meade in Videogaming and Computer Gaming Illustrated said that most of the challenge from the game came from inadequate design as it forced players to look between the mini-map, directional arrow and the main point of view which was disorienting. Mark Brownstein in Electronic Fun with Computers & Games alternatively found it took practice to get used to the game's controls.

A review in The Video Game Update proclaimed it to be the most impressive entry from Starpath yet, while Persons similarly said the game "exhibits more creativity in both graphic design and game play" than Starpath's previous efforts. Walter Salm of The Home News said the game would appeal to maze lovers will be Goodman went as far as to say that Escape From the Mindmaster "ranks among the finest video games on the market."

Goodman placed the game at first place in their Best Games of the year list for 1983. Goodman said that it was not a casual game, one that you play for a few minutes complementing the challenge it would give for experienced players. Lou Hudson of the Fort Worth Star-Telegram included the game in his top games of the year list for 1983. In Video Games Player's year end, Escape From the Mindmaster was an honorable mention to Ms. Pac-Man for its "Maze Game of the Year" category.

Some publications reviewed the unreleased ColecoVision version of the game. William Michael Brown of Electronic Fun with Computers & Games found it to be "one of the few games that is as challenging for adults as it is for younger players." Ray Dimetrosky of Computer Games complimentes the games graphics and gameplay, concluding that "the feeling you get when you find hidden puzzle pieces or rooms that lead you to your eventual safety is wonderful.

=== Retrospective reviews ===
In retrospective reviews, The Book of Atari Software 1984 said it was a very good maze game with "considerable depth". Writing for Old School Gamer Magazine in 2019, Eugenio Angueira wrote that Escape From the Mindmaster was one of the most impressive games for the Supercharger, noting smooth and nicely animated graphics.

Escape From the Mindmaster has appeared in Electronic Fun with Computers & Games 1984 list of the "Best 50 Videogames" of all-time list while Flux magazine included in their "Top 100 Video Games" in 1995. Weiss included the game in his book The 100 Greatest Console Video Games, 1977-1987 (2014), saying it was a highly sophisticated game upon its release that was still fun to play.

== See also ==
- List of Atari 2600 games

== Notes ==
=== Sources ===
- Addams, Shay; Gutman, Dan (April 1984). "Computer Game Buyer's Guide". Computer Games. Vol. 3, no. 1. New York, NY: Carnegie Publications. ISSN 0748-4461.
- Amrich, Dan; Barbagallo, Ralph; East, Mark; Hudak, Chris; Kitts, Jeff; Meston, Zach; Yang, Jeff (April 1995). "The Top 100 Video Games". Flux. No. 4. Harris Publications. ISSN 1074-5602.
- Angueira, Eugenio (January 2019). "The History of Starpath Corporation and the Supercharger". Old School Gamer Magazine. No. 8. Grimes, IA: BC Productions. ISSN 2574-8076.
- Bechtold, Alan R. (January 1983). "The Starpath Supercharger Reviewed". The Logical Gamer. No. 6. Topeka, KS: Logical Gamer Publications.
- Brown, William Michael (December 1983). "Escape From the Mindmaster". Electronic Fun with Computers & Games. Vol. 2, no. 2. New York, NY: Fun & Games Inc. ISSN 0746-0546.
- Brownstein, Mark (March 1983). "Escape From the Mindmaster". Electronic Fun with Computers & Games. Vol. 1, no. 5. New York, NY: Fun & Games Inc. ISSN 0746-0546.
- Dimetrosky, Ray (April 1984). "Video Game Buyer's Guide". Computer Games. Vol. 3, no. 1. New York, NY: Carnegie Publications. ISSN 0748-4461.
- Goodman, Danny (June 1983). "Starpath's Supercharger". Radio-Electronics. Vol. 54, no. 6. New York, NY: Gernsback Publications. ISSN 0033-7862.
- Goodman, Danny (June 1983). "The Top Ten Games of '83". Radio-Electronics. Vol. 54, no. 6. New York, NY: Gernsback Publications. ISSN 0033-7862.
- Gorzelany, Jim (July 1983). "The Home Front". JoyStik. Vol. 1, no. 6. USA: Publications International.
- Gutman, Dan, ed. (August–September 1983). "1983 Golden Joystick Awards". Video Games Player. Vol. 2, no. 1. New York, NY: Carnegie Publications. ISSN 0748-4453.
- Hudson, Lou (January 7, 1984). "Videoplay". Fort Worth Star-Telegram – via Newspapers.com.
- Hudson, Lou (January 14, 1984). "Videoplay". Fort Worth Star-Telegram – via Newspapers.com.
- Meade, E.C.; Clark, Jim (June 1983). "Escape From The Mindmaster". Videogaming and Computer Gaming Illustrated. Bethel, CT: Ion International. ISSN 0739-4373.
- Persons, Dan (August 1983). "Escape from the Mindmaster (Starpath/VCS)". Video Games. Vol. 1, no. 11. New York, NY: Pumpkin Press. ISSN 0733-6780.
- Salm, Walter (January 6, 1983). "A Game Cartridge is Not a Tape". The Home News. New Brunswick, NJ – via Newspapers.com.
- Stanton, Jeffrey; Wells, Robert P.; Rochowansky, Sandra; Mellin, Michael, eds. (1984). The Book of Atari Software 1984. Los Angeles, CA: The Book Company. ISBN 0-912003-04-9. ISSN 0738-4904.
- Stovall, Rawson (1984). The Vid Kid's Book of Home Video Games. Doubleday. ISBN 0-385-19309-2.
- Weiss, Brett (2014). The 100 Greatest Console Video Games 1977-1987. Schiffer Publishing. ISBN 978-0-7643-4618-7.
- Wiswell, Phil (February 1983). "The Supercharger Is Not a Communist Plot". Video Games. Vol. 1, no. 5. New York, NY: Pumpkin Press. ISSN 0733-6780.
- "The Making of...Impossible Mission". Edge. Bath, England: Future Publishing. October 2006. ISSN 1350-1593.
- "50 Best Games". Electronic Fun with Computers & Games. Vol. 2, no. 5. New York, NY: Fun & Games Inc. March 1984. ISSN 0746-0546.
- "The Making of...Impossible Mission". Retro Gamer. No. 22. Bath, England: Imagine Publishing. 2006. ISSN 1742-3155.
- How to Play Escape From the Mindmaster. Santa Clara, CA: Starpath. 1982.
- "Atari 2600-Compatible". The Video Game Update. Vol. 1, no. 9. December 1982. ISSN 0890-2143 – via Video Game History Foundation.
