= Party Mix (video game) =

1983 video game

- Developer(s): Starpath
- Publisher(s): Starpath
- Designer(s): Dennis Caswell
- Platform(s): Atari 2600
- Release: 1983
- Genre(s): Party
- Mode(s): Multiplayer

Party Mix is a 1983 party video game developed and published by Starpath for the Atari 2600. It was designed to be used with the Supercharger add-on, which gave the Atari 2600 the ability to multi-load games and is required for the game to function.

== Gameplay ==
The anthology consists of five titles: Bop a Buggy, Tug of War, Wizard's Keep, Down on the Line, and Handcar.

Both buggies at the starting line in Bop a Buggy
