= Starpath Supercharger =

Video game expansion peripheral cartridge

- The Supercharger and a few game boxes
- Design firm: Starpath
- Manufacturer: Starpath
- Introduced: August 1982; 44 years ago
- Discontinued: 1984
- Cost: 69.95 US$ (included one game: Phaser Patrol)
- Type: Expansion peripheral cartridge
- Memory: 6 KB RAM
- Connection: Cable earphone jack for cassette

The Starpath Supercharger (originally called the Arcadia Supercharger) is an expansion peripheral cartridge created by Starpath, for playing cassette-based proprietary games on the Atari 2600 video game console.

The device consists of a long cartridge with a handle on the end, and an audio cassette cable. It multiplies the Atari 2600's 128 bytes of RAM by 49 for a total of 6,272 bytes of RAM, allowing for the creation of specially compatible games which are larger and have higher resolution graphics than normal cartridges. A cable coming out of the side of the cartridge plugs into the earphone jack of any standard cassette player, for loading all Supercharger games from standard audio cassettes.

== Games ==
All Supercharger games were developed by Starpath.

Initial releases

Listed in order of release:

1. Phaser Patrol
2. Communist Mutants from Space
3. Fireball
4. Suicide Mission
5. Escape from the Mindmaster (prototype is called Labyrinth)
6. Dragonstomper (prototype is called Excalibur)
7. Killer Satellites
8. Rabbit Transit
9. Frogger, The Official
10. Party Mix

Mail order releases

These games were available only via mail order after Starpath declared bankruptcy.

- Sword of Saros
- Survival Island

Prototypes

- Sweat: The Decathlon Game
- Going Up??

== Compatibility ==
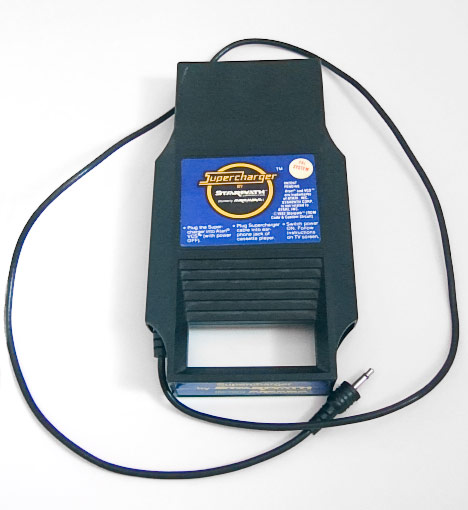
The Starpath Supercharger by itself. The device has a unique shape.

The Supercharger is compatible with Atari 2600, Atari 2600 Jr., and the Sears Video Arcade consoles.

Due to the shape of the Supercharger, it does not normally fit into the ColecoVision's Expansion Module #1, which is an adapter that allows the ColecoVision to play Atari 2600 games. However, if the cover of the expansion module is removed or an extender is used, the Supercharger will work. Extenders were sent to customers who called Starpath about such issues.

The Supercharger does not work on many Atari 7800 systems (which is typically backward compatible with the Atari 2600), although it does with some early models of the system. After Atari installed a circuit to fix a compatibility issue with the 2600 version of Dark Chambers, it subsequently caused incompatibility with the Supercharger and some other games that use the FE bank switching method.

== Reception ==
Danny Goodman of Creative Computing Video & Arcade Games said that the Supercharger's "graphics are something else", reporting that the diagonal lines in one game under development were among the smoothest he had seen in any console.

== Legacy ==
The complete library of games, including the prototype Sweat, was also released on audio CD as Stella Gets A New Brain by CyberPuNKS (Jim Nitchals, Dan Skelton, Glenn Saunders and Russ Perry Jr.). There are two releases, both sanctioned by Atari and Bridgestone Multimedia, who had obtained the rights to the Starpath library some time ago. The first release is a limited number not-for-profit product, which also includes the previously unreleased Atari prototype, Polo by Carol Shaw. The second release includes the Supercharger prototypes Meteoroid (an early version of Suicide Mission) and Excalibur (an early version of Dragonstomper), in addition to a number of homebrew games by permission of their respective authors, and the song Atari 2600 by Splitsville, fully licensed from the band.
