= Rabbit Transit (video game) =

1983 video game

- Developer: Starpath
- Publisher: Starpath
- Designer: Brian McGhie
- Platform: Atari 2600
- Release: July 1983
- Genre: Action
- Modes: Single-player, Multi-player

Rabbit Transit is a 1983 action video game released on cassette for the Atari 2600. It was published by Starpath and is only compatible with the Starpath Supercharger. The player takes control of a bunny rabbit that must hop to every platform on screen while avoiding obstacles in order to make it to the Bunny Bushes and start a family. The game is frequently described as a cute version of Q*bert or Frogger. Many critics found it to be enjoyable and surprisingly difficult. It is also frequently complimented for its appealing graphics.

== Gameplay ==
The player controls a bunny rabbit that can only hop at angles. The game takes place in two different screens. The first one is a grassy meadow, where the rabbit must hop down to the turtle in the river at the bottom. The rabbit must avoid a number of different obstacles to get there including snakes, butterflies, helicopters, and more. The turtle takes the player to the second screen, which has a diagonal grid of 31 platforms. The goal is to hop to each of these platforms, changing their color, while avoiding rocks dropped by a man above you. Once the color of every platform has been changed, the player watches a cutscene of the rabbit with its partner and an increasing number of kids. Then the game loops with new obstacles and increasing difficulty.

== Reception ==
The Video Game Update thought the graphics were really well done and said "the rabbit is especially endearing." They were confused by the demographics, considering the themes to be more appealing to young children but the difficulty more apt for older teenagers. Ultimately they recommend the game to "young children with fairly well-developed video game skills." Alan R. Bechtold of The Logical Gamer said "despite the simple format, the challenge rapidly escalates, after the first couple of rounds, into a serious challenge, indeed." Mike Wilson, Bechtold's co-reviewer, was more sour on the game saying, "it just doesn't seem to come together." Both reviewers agreed that the game's graphics were a highlight.

The first screen with the turtle at the bottom and a bouncing ball approaching the player rabbit.

Videogaming Illustrated provided a full strategy guide in one issue and called it "fun and fast-paced entertainment for the whole family. Adorable graphics and gameplay should keep most players hopping for quite awhile." Mark Brownstein of Video Games magazine compared the game heavily to Q*bert but also said "Since you actually get two somewhat different games, Rabbit Transit is a good buy."

British magazine TV Gamer called it a cross between Frogger and Q*bert and thought it was worth getting if you hadn't already played those games. German magazine TeleMatch thought it was a visually appealing game that really draws you in.
