= Official Xbox Magazine =

Monthly video game magazine

- Cover of the final issue (May 2020)
- Editor: Stephen Ashby
- Categories: Xbox, Xbox 360, Xbox One
- Frequency: 13 yearly
- Circulation: 425,000/month (US) and 66,894/month (UK)
- First issue: November 2001
- Final issue: May 2020
- Company: Future plc
- Country: United States/United Kingdom/Canada/Australia
- Language: English
- Website: Official website
- ISSN: 1534-7850

Official Xbox Magazine (OXM) was a monthly video game magazine which started in November 2001 around the launch of the original Xbox. A preview issue was released at E3 2001, with another preview issue in November 2001. The magazine was bundled with a disc that included game demos, preview videos and trailers, and other content, such as game or Xbox updates and free gamerpics. The discs also provided the software for the Xbox 360 through backward compatibility with original Xbox games for those without broadband and Xbox Live access. From January 2012, OXM no longer included a demo disc. In mid-2014, the American version was merged into the British version on the website, which lasted only a few months until Future plc announced that it was closing its website along with all the other websites that Future has published, including Edge and Computer and Video Games. In February 2015, OXM and all of Future's video game websites were redirected into GamesRadar.

The magazine was shut down in April 2020 by owners Future Publishing (with May 2020 as the final issue), in a review of titles. The COVID-19 pandemic was given as one of the reasons.

A Chinese version of the magazine was released at the "XBox Summer Video Game Show" held by Microsoft Taiwan on August 21 and 22, 2004 at the Third World Trade Center in Taipei. It was limited to 200 copies.

== Content ==
On the Disc (Discontinued in 2012)

Each issue originally contained a demo disc with Original Xbox, Xbox 360 and Xbox Live Arcade games. Issue #64 was the last issue with Original Xbox content. Beginning in January 2012, OXM stopped including demo discs, saying "You've told us you don't want the DVD anymore, and we listened....". The final demo disc, #131, ended up being in that same issue. Each demo contained unlockable content like gamer pics and hidden demos. Gamers could play the games and view the videos on the disc to gain points. The points had another use in which gamers used their points to research and build equipment for the in-game game 'OXM Universe'. 'OXMU' was discontinued in OXM's 100th issue.

We Heart Xbox
A section in which new games not yet shown to the mainstream public or user-modified hardware such as consoles or faceplates were shown.

Message Center
Besides showing readers' mail, the OXM crew revealed their 'Top 5' things on their mind at the moment. The 'Top 5' tradition was broken in Issue #85 of July 2008, when the staff instead answered to the question "What's your worst habit - and do you even want to break it?"
Xbox Next
In this section, upcoming games were highlighted and previewed.

Features
A section in which games received prolonged previews, or OXM may have an exclusive 6-10 page review for a certain game. There may also be special featured content like Issue #77's 'HDTV Buyer's Guide'.

Xbox Now
A section where every Xbox, Xbox 360, and Xbox Live Arcade game, and downloadable content was reviewed.

Xbox 365

A section which contained Xbox business articles, gaming news, 'Hard Stuff' (a section that reviews contraptions related to an Xbox console), '2,000 Pennies or Less' (a section that showed the best cheap games that can be bought for either Xbox or Xbox 360), the codes of the month, 'Forza Showroom' (a brief column that showed some of the best Forza Motorsport 2 car designs that people have made), a section for competing against the OXM crew in games like Lost Planet, Halo 3, Gears of War, and more, 'Media Ho!' (a section that talked about movies, books, and other items related to games), 'Live Space' (a section which showed gamers' Xbox Live gamertags, 'Ask Dr. Gamer' (a section in which gamers would ask Health doctor, Freddy Chen, gaming related information), and 'The (insert something here) of Xbox' (a section that talked about business and other things of the Xbox gaming world. The column 'The Business of Xbox' was written by Geoff Keighley through the May 2007 issue. However, until 2015, the column was written, on a less frequent basis, by Christ Morris. As of Issue #71, the end page rotated columnists, with guests including game creators Tim Schafer, Denis Dyack, and Randy Pitchford.

== Staff ==
UK and US Edition

- Editor: Chris Burke
- Games Editor: Dave Meikleham
- Staff Writer: Adam Bryant
- Production Editor: Drew Sleep
- Senior Art Editor: Warren Brown

== Review system ==
Until issue #52, the Official Xbox Magazine (OXM) used a 100-point system, scoring games out of 10.0 with .1 increments. The games that received at least a 9.0 were given an Editor's Choice award. Beginning with issue #53 (Holiday 2005), the US OXM switched to a 20-point scoring system, scoring games out of 10.0 with increments of 0.5. The UK edition though switched to a 10-point scoring system, scoring games out of 10. This ratings scale was detailed on the introduction page to every issue's review section. A score of 10.0 was not considered perfect, but is called "Classic" and is considered to be "one of those rare and very best of games." OXM's review scale did include a score of 11.0 (termed "Mecha Godzilla's Choice") as "Perfect," however the description for that score was "The unicorn. Will never happen. Never."

Twenty games received a 10/10 score from OXM, but only BioShock, The Elder Scrolls V: Skyrim and Grand Theft Auto V had been given this score by both the US and UK editions. The nine 10/10 games from the US edition included: Fight Night Round 3, Gears of War, Fallout 3, Halo 3, Call of Duty 4: Modern Warfare, Mass Effect, Gears of War 3 and Batman: Arkham City. Whereas the nine 10/10 games from the UK edition included: Grand Theft Auto IV, Project Gotham Racing 4, Call of Duty: Modern Warfare 2, The Elder Scrolls IV: Oblivion, Mass Effect 2, Halo: Reach, Portal 2, Deus Ex: Human Revolution and Mass Effect 3.

OXM also had begun reviewing Xbox Live Downloadable Content (DLC), on a three-point scale: Buy, Fanboys Only, and Deny. The exception was The Elder Scrolls IV: Shivering Isles expansion pack in issue 70, which, due to the game's size, being "much more than a simple map pack" was reviewed on the normal 20-point scale, receiving an 8.5 (Great). (The game was later released as an expansion on DVD.)

== Bonus materials ==
Some disks came with additional material for Xbox games. Early issues' demo disk included a costume expansion to Dead or Alive 3 and Easter eggs unlockable via inputting a code via the controller. Some material seen only available for download on Xbox Live was included on demo disks. Until 2015, most US demo discs included gamer pics centered on a game.

- Issue #53 contained the free exclusive beta for Final Fantasy XI.
- Issue #67 contained the Wizard's Tower and Thieves Den quests for The Elder Scrolls IV: Oblivion.
- Issue #69 contained Chapter 2 for Tom Clancy's Ghost Recon Advanced Warfighter.
- Issue #73 contained an exclusive demo for the Japanese RPG Eternal Sonata.
- Issue #74 contained an exclusive demo for Beautiful Katamari.
- Issue #77 contained a special demo for Guitar Hero III: Legends of Rock. (The demo is also found in copies of Tony Hawk's Proving Ground.)
- Issue #80 contained the Harmonix Track Pack 01: 3 exclusive songs for the popular video game Rock Band.
- Issue #82 contained the downloadable song Halo Theme MJOLNIR Mix for Guitar Hero III: Legends of Rock.
- Issue #46 (UK edition) contained the NXE update for the Xbox 360 dashboard.
- Issue #54 (UK edition) contained a Left 4 Dead 2 Xbox 360 theme.
- Issue #116 contained an Assassin's Creed pamphlet.

== Podcasts ==
Audio Podcast

KOXM was the weekly Official Xbox Magazine podcast, hosted by OXM Senior Editor Dave Rudden. The show was previously hosted by Ryan McCaffrey until he left Official Xbox Magazine to work at IGN. Dan Amrich used to be a McCaffrey's co-host, but he left the magazine and podcast to work at Activision/Blizzard. The audio podcast featured a recap in the week's past events and game releases, two trivia contests (Name That Xbox Sound Effect and Stick it to the Dan (formerly Dan's Useless Trivia)) for a prize (usually a tee shirt or Xbox Live Arcade game), and developer interviews. The show was produced by Andy Bauman.

Video Podcast

Until 2015, the OXM Video Podcast was updated much less frequently, with gaps over a month or more. The video podcast slowed until it was picked up again in the form of Inside Xbox, a short Xbox Live program that OXM became a part of in 2008. The OXM Report on Inside Xbox featured similar video content to the original video podcast, but with more timely information on games such as Gears of War 2 and Mirror's Edge It was posted on Xbox Live every other Sunday.

== Awards ==
On October 12, 2007, the UK edition was awarded 'Best Xbox Magazine' at the Games Media Awards.
