= Princess Leia's Stolen Death Star Plans =

Studio album by Palette-Swap Ninja
- Released: 2017
- Producers: Dan Amrich and Jude Kelley

Princess Leia's Stolen Death Star Plans is a 2017 concept album, combining the music of every song on Sgt. Pepper's Lonely Hearts Club Band with lyrics describing the plot of Star Wars. It was produced by Dan Amrich and Jude Kelley, under the name "Palette-Swap Ninja".

== Production ==
Kelley and Amrich first met when they were in a band together in California. Their shared interest in video games led to a friendship which continued even after Kelley moved to Boston in 2007. At this point, they formed Palette-Swap Ninja, a long-distance musical collaboration originally dedicated to parody songs about video games. They soon realized that their most popular songs were those that had a narrative, and decided to make a concept album which would tell a complete story.

Amrich's original idea was to combine the music from Tommy by The Who, with the plot of the documentary The King of Kong. In 2012, Amrich and his wife Katrin Auch visited Kelley in Boston. While the three were at lunch, Amrich confessed that he could not make the King of Kong/Tommy combination work, at which point Auch said that a successful project of that type would require components that were "bigger (and) more universally beloved," like Star Wars or Sgt. Pepper. By the end of the meal, Amrich and Kelley had devised several of the song titles.

Amrich spent two years writing the lyrics, after which he and Kelley began the task of replicating the music; this primarily involved software, including Logic Pro, but also used some real instruments, including the same model of electric organ that featured in "Lucy in the Sky with Diamonds".

Amrich and Kelley originally intended to release the album in December 2015, to coincide with the theatrical release of Star Wars: The Force Awakens, but felt that it was not ready; they similarly missed the December 2016 release of Rogue One. They finally released the album free online in May 2017, to commemorate the 40th anniversary of Star Wars and the 50th anniversary of Sergeant Pepper, which coincidentally were less than a month apart.

== Reception ==
Rolling Stone France commended the album as a "surprisingly elegant mixture of two masterpieces". Paste lauded it as "meticulously planned" and "more perfect than it deserves to be." Consequence praised Amrich and Kelley for "having told the film's story in order without futzing too much with each song's cadence and instrumentation."

Io9 felt it was "most impressive" and "really good", and noted the inclusion of themes from John Williams' Star Wars music. Jason Kottke called it "amazing". Slate found its lyrics to be "clever", and observed that the music video begins with its own version of the opening crawl.

== Live performance ==
In 2018, Amrich and Kelley — accompanied by the non-profit Awesöme Orchestra Collective — gave a free live performance of the album at the University of California, Berkeley's Hertz Hall.
