= Communist Mutants from Space =

1982 video game

- Developer: Starpath
- Publisher: Starpath
- Programmer: Stephen H. Landrum
- Platform: Atari 2600
- Release: NA: 1982
- Genre: Fixed shooter
- Mode: Single-player

Communist Mutants from Space is a fixed shooter video game programmed by Stephen H. Landrum for the Atari 2600 with the Starpath Supercharger cassette accessory. It was published in 1982 by Starpath (formerly Arcadia). The game is similar to Galaxian, adding a variety of gameplay-changing options.

== Plot ==
Aliens from the communist planet of Rooskee are invading peaceful, democratic planets and turning their inhabitants into "Communist Mutants." The communist mutant armies are controlled by the Mother Creature, a strange alien who has gone mad due to irradiated vodka.

== Gameplay ==
Destroy the Mother Creature while avoiding mutants and their bombs.

The player starts off with three reserve cannons. The object is to destroy the mutants aliens and, most importantly, the Mother Creature. The mutants hatch from moving eggs at the top of the screen. Because the Mother Creature replenishes eggs when they hatch or are destroyed, it must be defeated before the player can advance to the next wave. If a mutant or a bomb thrown by a mutant comes into contact with the cannon, the cannon will be destroyed and a reserve must be called up. A new cannon is awarded on every other wave.

=== Options ===
An in-game menu allows a variety of gameplay changes. The player can toggle the shield option on or off. If activated, "shield" mode allows pulling back on the joystick to become invincible for a short period (only one shield is allotted per level). "Time warp" allows the player to press up on the joystick to temporarily slow the enemies. The type of shot fired can be changed by activating the "penetrating fire" option (which enhances the beam fired so that it can hit two mutants rather than one) and/or the "guided fire" option (which causes the beam to be moved with the joystick rather than firing in a straight line).

The menu also allows for selecting 1-4 players. Players one and three share the first joystick while players two and four share the second.

== Development ==
Communist Mutants from Space was the first commercial game that Stephen Landrum developed. In a 1993 interview, he was asked about the origin of the game's name:

I would like to take credit for the name, but I can't. It was developed by our advertising agency, and was the best thing that they did for Starpath. I must admit that I was really surprised when they suggested the name. I thought they were joking, but when I realized that they were serious, I couldn't believe it! It took me a little while to realize that the outrageousness of the name would actually help the program. We had a great poster made up from the artwork for the box cover, but unfortunately I only have one of them. We should have sold the poster, as it would have made quite a bit of money.

== Easter egg ==
Holding fire during power-on of the Atari 2600 causes the "HI" on the high scores screen to change to "SHL", the initials of programmer Stephen H. Landrum.

== Reviews ==
- Games

== See also ==
- Astro Blaster
