= B-17 Bomber (video game) =

1982 video game

- Box art
- Developer: Mattel Electronics
- Publisher: Mattel Electronics
- Platform: Intellivision
- Release: July 23, 1982
- Genre: Action
- Mode: Single-player

B-17 Bomber is a single-player video game released by Mattel for their Intellivision console in 1982. The game was bundled with the Intellivoice voice synthesis module.

== Gameplay ==
In B-17 Bomber, the player controls a simulated bomber aircraft. The objective of the game is to complete missions by dropping bombs on targets in German-occupied Europe, including anti-aircraft guns, airports, factories, and naval vessels.

The game plays like a rudimentary flight simulator, which models altitude, air speed, tilt and pitch, fuel consumption, and the effects of taking damage. Enemy planes occasionally attack the aircraft from one of four directions (12, 3, 6 or 9 o'clock) and can be shot down to score points and prevent damage to the B-17. The aircraft can also come under fire from flak guns on the ground, which can be taken out with a bomb. The mission ends when the aircraft either returns to England (it automatically lands on reaching the coast) or is destroyed. If the aircraft lands successfully in England, the mission score is shown, and a new mission is generated. Gameplay continues indefinitely until the aircraft is destroyed, or the player turns off the console.

When an enemy plane attacks, the Intellivoice module announces the direction of the attack, prompting the player to turn that direction in order to fire back. While the game is playable without the Intellivoice module, it becomes very difficult since the player is given no other audio cue that an enemy is approaching, and must guess which direction the attack is coming from.

== Reception ==
Danny Goodman of Creative Computing Video & Arcade Games said in 1983 that B-17 Bomber was his favorite Intellivoice game, praising the voices and noting that the game and others "made the voice an integral part of game play". B-17 Bomber was well received, gaining a Certificate of Merit in the category of "1984 Best Videogame Audio-Visual Effects (Less than 16K ROM)" at the 5th annual Arkie Awards.
