= Dan Amrich =

American journalist (born 1971)

- Born: Daniel Edward Amrich; February 5, 1971 (age 55); Ewing, New Jersey, U.S.
- Other name: Dan Elektro
- Occupation: Community Developer
- Spouse: Katrin Auch
- Website: www.bunnyears.net

Daniel Edward Amrich (born 5 February 1971) is an American writer, author, actor, musician, and social media expert. He graduated from Ithaca College with a major in audio production and minor in writing and became a professional journalist and critic with numerous video game and music magazines and websites. He has worked for leading print and online journals including Flux Magazine, Wired, Time Out New York, and others. He works for Ubisoft as a content designer, and resides in the San Francisco Bay Area in California.

== Career ==
=== Journalism ===
During the mid-1990s, Amrich wrote for Harris Publications' Country Guitar Magazine, Guitar World, and SLAM Magazine. He also worked as an editor for Flux Magazine, ran the video games section of America Online's Critics' Choice, and was the Editor in Chief of GameSport Magazine. He also wrote freelance articles for Wired, Time Out New York, and NBA Inside Stuff, among others.

In 1996, Andy Eddy offered him the position of Executive Editor on Digital Diner, an internet lifestyle magazine startup from Metropolis Publications. Only two issues were released before the magazine folded.

In 1997, Amrich began working at GamePro under the editorial aliases Dan Elektro and Bad Hare. He eventually became the features editor, wrote the responses in the reader letters column, and was the main editorial moderator at GamePro.com's user forums. He also created the GamePro Enigma metapuzzle for the March 2003 issue, and the GamePro Enigma II for the March 2004 issue. Before ending his tenure with the magazine, he authored the book PlayStation 2 For Dummies.

From 2003 to 2009, Amrich worked at numerous Future plc publications. As Senior Editor, he helped launch the US version of GamesRadar in 2005 and appeared in numerous episodes of its podcast TalkRadar, even following his leave of the site.

Amrich worked as Senior Editor at Official Xbox Magazine from 2006 to 2009, where he wrote features, reviews, the letter column, and various other articles for the magazine and its website, OXM Online. He was also the moderator of the OXM discussion forum on Xbox.com.

Amrich left Official Xbox Magazine to take on the Editor-in-Chief role for the duration of World of Warcraft: The Official Magazine's first quarterly issue. He announced in December 2009 that he would leave journalism to pursue an alternative career path in the video game industry. Before joining Activision, Dan was the weekly co-host of the Official Xbox Magazine podcast alongside Ryan McCaffrey.

=== Social media ===
In 2010, Amrich accepted a position to join Activision as Social Media Manager, with a title change to Community Manager in 2012 until March 2014. He maintained a community blog, published interviews with video game developers, discussed Activision with its community, and hosted the weekly One of Swords Podcast. He usually alternated between two co-hosts, Katrin Auch and Hugh Sterbakov. Music heard in the One of Swords Podcast was created by Yameen. He usually had one interview per episode from someone working on a current Activision game.

In March 2014, Amrich left Activision to work in the San Francisco Bay area for Ubisoft as the Community Developer for Studio SF.

== Music ==
Amrich is a vocalist with two years spent in private opera singing training and several years of experience in musical theater. He performed for five years with the San Francisco Bay Area 80s cover band, Fast Times, before leaving to pursue personal musical interests.

The result of his departure is the parody band Palette-Swap Ninja, a musical duo featuring Jude Kelley alongside Amrich. Their music comprises modified and humorous covers of popular artists, including Red Hot Chili Peppers, Bowling For Soup, Paul McCartney and more. In addition to vocals, Amrich plays guitar, bass, and on one song, kazoo.

in May 2017, Palette-Swap Ninja released Princess Leia's Stolen Death Star Plans, a complete album parody of The Beatles' Sgt. Pepper's Lonely Hearts Club Band that retells the story of Star Wars in sequential order. The album was released for free in honor of the 40th anniversary of Star Wars and the 50th anniversary of Sgt. Pepper. A series of YouTube videos syncing the music to film footage was created by Katrin Auch. Critical and fan reactions were largely positive; Star Wars actor Mark Hamill called it "ingenious" while Nerdist called it "the best parody album ever."

== Writing ==
In February 2012, Amrich released Critical Path: How To Review Videogames for a Living, which featured a foreword by Gears of War designer, Cliff Bleszinski, who joked that alternate titles could have been "Abandon All Hope, Ye Who Enter Here" or "For the Love of the Game". Conceived shortly after Amrich left GamePro Magazine, the book is a guide to videogame journalism which constantly draws on Amrich's 15 years experience working both sides of the industry to for demonstrations and examples. Self-published, the book was heavily promoted through Laser Time podcast, hosted by former fellow GamesRadar writers and is now available in print and electronically at Amazon.com.

== Personal life ==
Amrich is a self-confessed "fanatic" of the 80s film franchise, Ghostbusters, and a "puzzle nerd". Dan maintains one of the only sites devoted to Kit Williams and his elaborate, illustrated puzzle book, Masquerade.

== Acting ==
Amrich's work as an actor includes commercials and voice-over performance. He has appeared in numerous commercials, and his voice work appears in The Sims: Bustin' Out. Amrich is also a life member of the International Jugglers' Association.
