= Space Spartans =

1982 video game

- Developer: Mattel Electronics
- Publishers: Mattel Electronics; Sears
- Designers: William C. Fisher; Steve Roney; Mike Minkoff; Brian Dougherty
- Platform: Intellivision
- Release: September 1982
- Genre: Space combat simulator
- Mode: Single-player

Space Spartans is a 1982 space combat simulator video game developed and published by Mattel Electronics for the Intellivision. It is heavily based on Star Raiders, a game released in 1980 for the Atari 8-bit computers. It was initially programmed by Brian Dougherty and completed by William C. Fisher and Steve Roney. It is the first game which supported the Intellivoice voice synthesis module. The game was also released under Sears' Super Video Arcade label for the Intellivision.

== Gameplay ==
The objective of Space Spartans is to survive as long as possible against a never-ending onslaught of alien enemies, while defending a set of star bases given at the start of the game. The player flies a solo fighter craft that navigates over a Sector Grid. Enemies also roam the Grid and attempt to destroy the player's ship and their star bases. The player must intercept the enemy fighters and destroy their bases by switching between the Grid and a first-person battle view. During battles, time progresses at a slower rate, but enemies still move periodically and can combine forces to increase attacks on the player and/or their bases.

The Intellivoice module is required in order to play Space Spartans properly, as it gives the player critical information that is not displayed on screen. This includes alerts about star bases being under attack, the number of aliens in the player's current sector, their energy level, and which of the ship's systems are damaged or under repair.

The player's ship consists of five main systems that allow the ship to move, target enemies, fire automatically, jump from sector to sector, and reduce damage to the ship. When hit by an enemy, at least one system is damaged depending on the status of the shields. Damaged systems are less effective, and they can be destroyed. The ship has a repair capability that can automatically begin repairs on damaged systems. While under repair, the system rapidly switches on and off, making it significantly less effective and, in the case of shields, increasing the risk of catastrophic damage should they be switched off when hit. The game ends if all of the ship's systems are destroyed.

Energy is consumed at a steady rate while the ship's systems are powered up (including the repair system when idle). Additionally, moving and firing the ship's lasers consume extra energy. The player must monitor their energy level throughout the game via the Intellivoice, and periodically visit a friendly star base to refuel. Star bases can also quickly repair all damaged systems. If the ship runs out of power, the game immediately ends.

If the player defeats all enemies in the Sector Grid, they have the option to reposition their remaining star bases before resuming play. Over the first five rounds, the speed and difficult of play increases. In some situations, the player may receive a new star base if one was destroyed earlier in the game.

Enemies will target the player's star bases during the game. When any base comes under attack, a robotic voice announces which one to alert the player. The base takes damage over time, scaled by how many enemies are in the base's sector. If a base's damage exceeds its limit, it is destroyed. When all three bases have been destroyed, the player is left on their own to survive as long as possible with no more chance to refuel.
