= Flux (magazine) =

Defunct pop culture magazine 1994–1995

Flux Magazine
- Editor: Jeff Kitts
- Categories: Gaming, music magazine
- Frequency: Bi-monthly
- Publisher: Dennis Page
- Founded: 1994
- Company: Harris Publications
- Country: United States
- Based in: New York City
- Language: English
- Website: www.fluxmagazine.com
- ISSN: 1074-5602

Flux was a short-lived magazine in the mid-1990s which focused on music (mostly hard rock and hip-hop), comic books and video games.

== History and profile ==
The magazine was bi-monthly and lasted for seven issues. The headquarters was in New York City and the publisher was Harris Publications. It was presented as an edgier alternative to magazines such as EGM and GamePro. Notable recurring departments included "Don't Ever Do This", which offered explicit instructions for pranks and antisocial behavior, and "Babewatch", which was merely photos of attractive women from TV shows, movies, and comic books.

Starting with issue #4, the publisher began releasing two different editions of the magazine, one for the newsstand and the other for the direct market/comic bookshops. The covers of the newsstand issues would often focus more on popular video games at the time such as Mortal Kombat 3, while the direct market editions would focus more on popular comic books at the time like Lady Death. The interior content would be identical, however the direct market issues were numbered starting from 1, so issue #4 was #1 in direct market, etc.

Amongst its editors was Dan Amrich, who would go on to write for GamePro for several years under the moniker of Dan Elektro. Comics reviews were written by Christopher Golden, who would later write comics himself, as well as horror and fantasy novels. The original magazine folded in 1995, but in 1997, it relaunched again starting with issue #1 and also available digitally on their website. The new version is incorporated in the UK.
