= Bomb Squad (video game) =

- Bomb Squad box cover
- Developer: Mattel
- Publisher: Mattel / Sears
- Designers: Gene Smith, Shatao Lin
- Platform: Intellivision
- Release: NA: 1982
- Genre: Puzzle
- Mode: Single-player

Bomb Squad is a puzzle video game released for the Mattel Intellivision in 1982. It is the second of five games released for the console that requires the Intellivoice speech synthesis module.

== Gameplay ==
In Bomb Squad, the player takes the role of a technician sent to a building resembling the World Trade Center to defuse a time bomb. The player has a set amount of time to correctly enter a code of between one and three numerical digits. Each digit is placed on a grid where each segment displays "garbage", obscuring the number. To reveal the number one segment at a time, the player must access a circuit board behind that segment and replace or remove electronic components in a specific order. When the circuit board is displayed, the player's partner's voice tells him/her which parts to remove or replace in which order. Parts are not always indicated in consecutive order (e.g. "Replace this part second, this third, this first"), so the player must listen to the voice and watch the screen to discern the correct order. The player can press a button on the controller to repeat the sequence at any time.

The player has a wire cutter to cut wire traces, a pair of pliers to pick up, move and drop parts, and a soldering iron to connect parts to the board. He/she can also use a fire extinguisher to put out a part that is overheating. When told to "cut out" parts, the player must remove the part from the board and replace it with a wire trace. When told to "replace" the part, the player must note the shape and color of the part being removed, and connect another part that is either the same shape or the same color. (Once the relationship between old and new part is known, that pattern remains in effect for the remainder of that circuit board.) Connecting an incorrect part or placing the part in the wrong place will cause the bomb's timer to speed up, while cutting out more than one part at a time or allowing a part to overheat will sound an alarm and eventually lead to the player being permanently locked out of the segment. (On the highest difficulty, allowing a part to overheat causes the bomb to explode, instantly ending the game.)

If the player successfully replaces or removes all of the indicated parts on a circuit board, that segment will change to either a lit or a darkened square, indicating whether that segment is part of that digit. The player can strategically choose which segments to operate on to minimize the number of boards he/she must complete in order to guess the code. If the player guesses the code correctly, the bomb is defused and the player is called a hero. If time runs out or the player enters the wrong code, the bomb explodes and destroys the building.

== Concept ==
Bomb Squad is essentially a variant on several different "guess the number" puzzle games. It was heavily inspired by the 1974 movie Juggernaut, and used "Juggernaut" as a working title.

== Reception ==
Videogaming and Computer Gaming Illustrated said "there's no disputing its quality; the audience for which it was designed will have a field day."

Videogiochi considered the voice features part of what made the game successful.

Dick Blomberg of Joystick gave the game a rating of 4.

Video Games said that "defusing bombs, imaginary or otherwise, may not be everyone's idea of a good time."

Video and Computer Gaming Illustrated said that "This is the kind of game Reactor should have been."

Creative Computing Video & Arcade Games said that "I hesitate to call Bomb Squad a game, since it is more of a puzzle. Patience, skill, a good memory and steady hands are essential for completing this game."

Tilt felt that the theme was original but the game itself was not interesting.

Electronic Games 1983 Software Encyclopedia gave the game an overall rating of 10.
