= Danny Goodman =

American computer programmer, technology consultant

Danny Goodman is a computer programmer, technology consultant, and an author of over three dozen books and hundreds of magazine articles on computer-related topics. He is best known as the author of The Complete HyperCard Handbook (1987, Bantam Books, 650,000 copies in print), The JavaScript Bible (1996, IDG Books, 500,000 copies in print), and Dynamic HTML (1998, O'Reilly & Associates, 100,000 copies in print). His The Complete AppleScript Handbook (1993, Random House) is also notable as an important early work on the AppleScript programming language.

Goodman began writing about electronics and computers in the late 1970s, and became a full-time author in 1981. In 1987, the first edition of the highly acclaimed The Complete HyperCard Handbook was published. This influential work was once cited as being "the best selling Macintosh book and fastest selling computer book in history".

Having received critical acclaim with his Macintosh-related works, especially on scripting via HyperCard and AppleScript, he turned his attention to the new scripting language of the Internet, JavaScript, and related technologies such as HTML and Cascading Style Sheets. His articles on the websites of Netscape, Apple Computer, and O'Reilly Media have been popular and noted for being accessible to both experts and non-professionals. In particular, his better known works have covered important techniques for achieving compatible cross-browser scripting solutions, dealing with the many differences of the major browsers Netscape Navigator, Internet Explorer, Opera, Safari and others; as well as discussing cross-platform issues involving the Macintosh, Windows, and Unix environments.

Goodman has written a few apps for the iPhone, namely iFeltThat (earthquake maps) and BeaconAid-HF (for radio frequency monitoring).

Goodman was born in Chicago, Illinois, and moved to San Francisco in 1983. He has a BA and M.A. from the University of Wisconsin–Madison in Classical Antiquity.

== Awards ==
- Computer Press Association Book Awards:
  - Best Product Specific Book (1987): The Complete HyperCard Handbook (1987, Bantam Books)
  - Best Product Specific Book (1988): Danny Goodman's HyperCard Developer's Guide (1988, Bantam Books)
  - Best Introductory How-To Book, Systems (1992): Danny Goodman's Macintosh Handbook (1992, Bantam Books)
- Software Publishers Association Awards:
  - Best Utility (1987): Focal Point (1987, Activision)
  - Best Add-On (1987): Focal Point (1987, Activision)
  - Best User Interface (1987): Business Class (1987, Activision)
