= Starpath =

Defunct American video game company

Starpath Corporation
- Type: Private
- Industry: Video games
- Predecessor: Arcadia Corporation
- Founded: Livermore, California, USA; June 1981
- Founder: Alan Bayley(1933-2010); Robert Brown; Craig Nelson
- Defunct: 1984
- Headquarters: Santa Clara, California, USA
- Key people: Dennis Caswell, programmer Steve Hales, programmer Stephen Landrum, programmer Jon Leupp, programmer Brian McGhie, programmer Scott Nelson, programmer Kevin Norman, programmer
- Products: Starpath Supercharger; 12 games
- Owner: Epyx (1984-1993); Bridgestone Multimedia Group (1993-present)

Starpath Corporation was a U.S. company known for creating the Starpath Supercharger in August 1982. The company was founded under the name Arcadia Corporation in 1981 by Alan Bayley, Robert Brown, and Craig Nelson. It changed its name to Starpath shortly after for trademark reasons because Emerson Radio Corporation had released a video game console named the Emerson Arcadia 2001.

The Starpath Supercharger is a peripheral cartridge for the Atari 2600 video game console that expands the machine capabilities by adding more RAM, allowing for higher resolution graphics and larger games, and by providing a connector to which a regular cassette player can be connected, thus permitting larger games, stored on tape, to be loaded.

As the video game console market collapsed Starpath's fortunes began to worsen. Sales of their existing titles were in a steep decline as the console market flooded with games. Retailers were also uninterested in stocking new titles as they couldn't sell what they already had. Without enough capital to switch to developing for the home computer market Starpath looked for a buyer. Epyx, which shared some board members with Starpath, would purchase the company in 1984. Several development staff continued to work at Epyx after the merger and transitioned to making home computer games. One of the last titles in development at Starpath, 'Sweat! The Decathlon Game' for a Supercharger equipped Atari 2600, was redeveloped as a Commodore 64 game. Rechristened Summer Games it became a big hit for Epyx and resulting in a long succession of ports, sequels, and spinoffs. Scott Nelson, the developer of Sweat!, worked on both Summer Games and its direct sequel Summer Games II. As of 2004, rights to Starpath games are owned by Bridgestone Multimedia, a religious multimedia company.
