= Robot Tank =

1983 video game

- Developer: Activision
- Publisher: Activision
- Designer: Alan Miller
- Platform: Atari 2600
- Release: June 1983
- Genre: Shoot 'em up
- Mode: Single-player

Robot Tank is a first-person shoot 'em up written by Alan Miller for the Atari 2600 and published by Activision in 1983. It is similar in design to Atari, Inc.'s Battlezone tank combat arcade video game and more so to its 2600 port. Robot Tank adds different systems which can individually be damaged—instead of the vehicle always exploding upon being shot—and weather effects.

== Gameplay ==
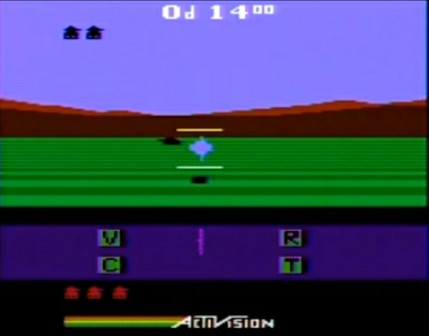
The first-person view from the tank

The player remotely controls a robot tank in 2019, using radar to find and destroy enemy robot tanks intent on reaching downtown Santa Clara, California, United States. The enemy is organized into squadrons of 12 tanks each. Defeating an enemy squadron adds a reserve tank to the initial three, to a maximum of 12. The game ends when all of the player's tanks are destroyed.

As the player's tank is damaged, firepower and/or visual display capabilities are irreparably worsened. Enough damage eventually destroys a tank. Combat can take place at any time of day or night (displayed on-screen), which adds challenge in tracking enemy combatants by radar alone. Weather conditions, announced at the start of each level, can be clear, rain, snow, or fog. Rain slows the tank's movements, snow causes the tank to lose traction and fog impairs the tank's vision.

== Development ==
Robot Tank was designed by Alan Miller for Activision. Miller had previously developed games at Atari, Inc. such as Surround (1977), Hangman (1978) and Basketball (1978). After leaving Atari, Inc. to form Activision with David Crane, Miller made the games Checkers (1980), Tennis (1981) and Ice Hockey (1981), and his most financially successful game, Starmaster (1982). Prior to developing Robot Tank, Miller began developing a racing game which he halted as he described it as "unworkable".

Robot Tank started out as a game about a remote-controlled tank battle which had the development title of Robotank. Miller spent about two months writing and editing code and producing about 200 pages of hand-written notes of computer printouts. Miller consulted with his fellow designers at Activision and began programming in the games graphics that included mountains, tanks, colors, and other visual features. The next two months of development were spent on the video and audio aspects and also making the gameplay have the appropriate level of challenge. The final two months involved his colleagues playing the game and hundreds of hours debugging the game. Miller recalled that "After I finish a game, I really hate it and I don't want to see it again for months."

== Release ==
The Wall Street Journal reported in January 1983 that Robot Tank was scheduled for release in mid-1983. The game was released for the Atari 2600 in June 1983. Electronic Games listed Robot Tank along with Megamania (1982), Enduro (1983), River Raid (1982) and Pitfall! (1982) as among the biggest hits for Activision in 1983.

Robot Tank was included in the compilation titles Activision Anthology (2002) for PC, PlayStation 2, and Game Boy Advance and in Activision Hits Remixed (2006) for the PlayStation Portable.

== Reception ==
Reception

Review scores
Publication	Score
AllGame	4/5
Computer and Video Games	85%
Electronic Fun with Computers & Games	3/4
Micro & Video	4/5

From contemporary reviews, critics such as Bill Kunkel, juvenile journalist Rawson Stovall and publication Computer Entertainer all praised the game for its visuals. Kunkel said the game's graphics was "non-parallel in the 2600 universe" noting the visual depth. Stovall praised small touches to the graphics, such as the visuals becoming screen static when the player's tank is destroyed. The Computer Entertainer review specifically praised its unique first-person point of view in its gameplay.

Critics also complimented the gameplay, Kunkel and Robert J. Sodaro of Videogaming & Computergaming Illustrated specifically noting how the weather effected the gameplay. Michael Blanchet of Electronic Fun with Computers & Games stated "for every obvious strategy there is another subtle, almost hidden one that must be discovered and implemented. This is a good solid challenge for anyone looking for a different breed of shoot-em-up." Sodaro and Blanchet both critiqued the lack of any way to repair the players damaged tanks. Kunkel went as far to declare the game Miller's "masterpiece" and "perhaps the finest target-arcade program ever developed for the 2600." while Computer Entertainer stated it was "the best combat game yet for the Atari 2600 system."

Some critics felt the game was unoriginal. Dan persons of Video Games suggested developers "should be moving on from this simple sort of shoot 'em-up, but Robot Tank has been done with such obvious care and so much style that I can't help but love it." Stovall found that it was a hybrid of Atari's Battlezone (1980) and having the gameplay of Starmaster, while Sodaro found that the game was not a knock-off of BattleZone, and only borrowed elements such as being set in a first-person view of a tank. A representative from Activision responded to the game being derivative of Battlezone, saying "We don't steal any of our ideas. The game idea (Robot Tank) is a generic one in the industry." Jose Renato Garcia of Micro & Video found the gameplay to be good but grew repetitive. He ultimately recommending the game the game overall for its high quality graphics.

Electronic Fun with Computer & Games included Robot Tank as among the best video games ever in 1984.

From retrospective reviews, Brett Alan Weiss of AllGame referred to Robot Tank as both "far ahead of its time" and "one of the most sophisticated Atari 2600 games." while stating that most of the weather and time change gave the game a false sense of versatility, since it was still just about dodging and attacking other tanks which grew repetitive. Jeremy Dunham commented on the game in his review of Activision Anthology (2002). Dunham stated that along with Pitfall II: Lost Caverns (1984), Robot Tank really stood out for its graphics with its 3D-aesthetic and the aforementioned weather and short-circuit effects.

== See also ==
- List of Atari 2600 games
- List of Activision games: 1980–1999
