= Starmaster =

1982 video game

- Developer: Activision
- Publisher: Activision
- Designer: Alan Miller
- Platform: Atari 2600
- Release: June 1982
- Genre: Space combat simulation
- Mode: Single-player

Starmaster is a space combat simulation video game written for the Atari 2600 by Alan Miller and published in June 1982 by Activision. The game involves the player travelling through space attacking enemy starfighters who are invading starbases. The player traverses through a map called the galactic chart to destroy all the enemies and survive against oncoming enemy attacks and crashing with meteors.

Miller had previously worked for Atari, Inc. developing games for the Atari 2600 before forming Activision with David Crane and making games Checkers (1980), Tennis (1981) and Ice Hockey (1981). Miller described Starmaster as being influenced by Cosmic Conflict (1978) for the Magnavox Odyssey 2 and Star Raiders (1980) for the Atari 8-bit computers.

The game became Miller's most successful game at that point in his career and would receive positive reviews from publications such as Electronic Games, The Video Game Update and The Fresno Bee. In 1983, at the Fourth Annual Arcade Awards, along with Atlantis (1982) it won a "Certificate of Merit" in the "Videogame of the Year" category.

== Gameplay ==
Gameplay screenshot

Starmaster is set in outerspace where the player must protect starbases from enemy starfighters. The game can be played a four levels of difficulty,⁬ with the first being "Ensign" having nine enemy fighters to defeat with meteors and enemies moving at normal speed while the highest being "StarMaster" with 31 enemies to defeat and the speed of meteors and enemies moving at 2.5 times the speed as Ensign.

The game has four distinct modes of operation: galactic chart analysis, warp travel, docking with a starbase, and engaging an enemy. On the galactic chart, the player navigates a map of the galaxy that is on a six by six matrix. Here they can view their location, starbase locations, and enemy starfighters. They can also see their Mission Attack Control Computer (MACC) which shows stats such as their energy remaining, their ship damage status and the energy required to make a warp to a selected location on the map. The color of the display panel also showcased information, such as green indicating they are flying to an empty sector while a red panel suggested flying to sections with enemy starfighters. The player can select a sector of the galaxy to which to warp to either engage with enemies or dock with a starbase for refueling and repairs. While warping to a section, the player must avoid meteors by either dodging them or shooting them with lasers. Getting hit causes energy to be depleted or could cause damage to the ship. Damage to the player limits the player's abilities. These range from losing shields leading to one hit kills from meteors or enemies, losing the ability to fire lasers, losing radar which makes warp travel cost double the energy, and losing radar which no longer lets you view enemies on the galactic chart.

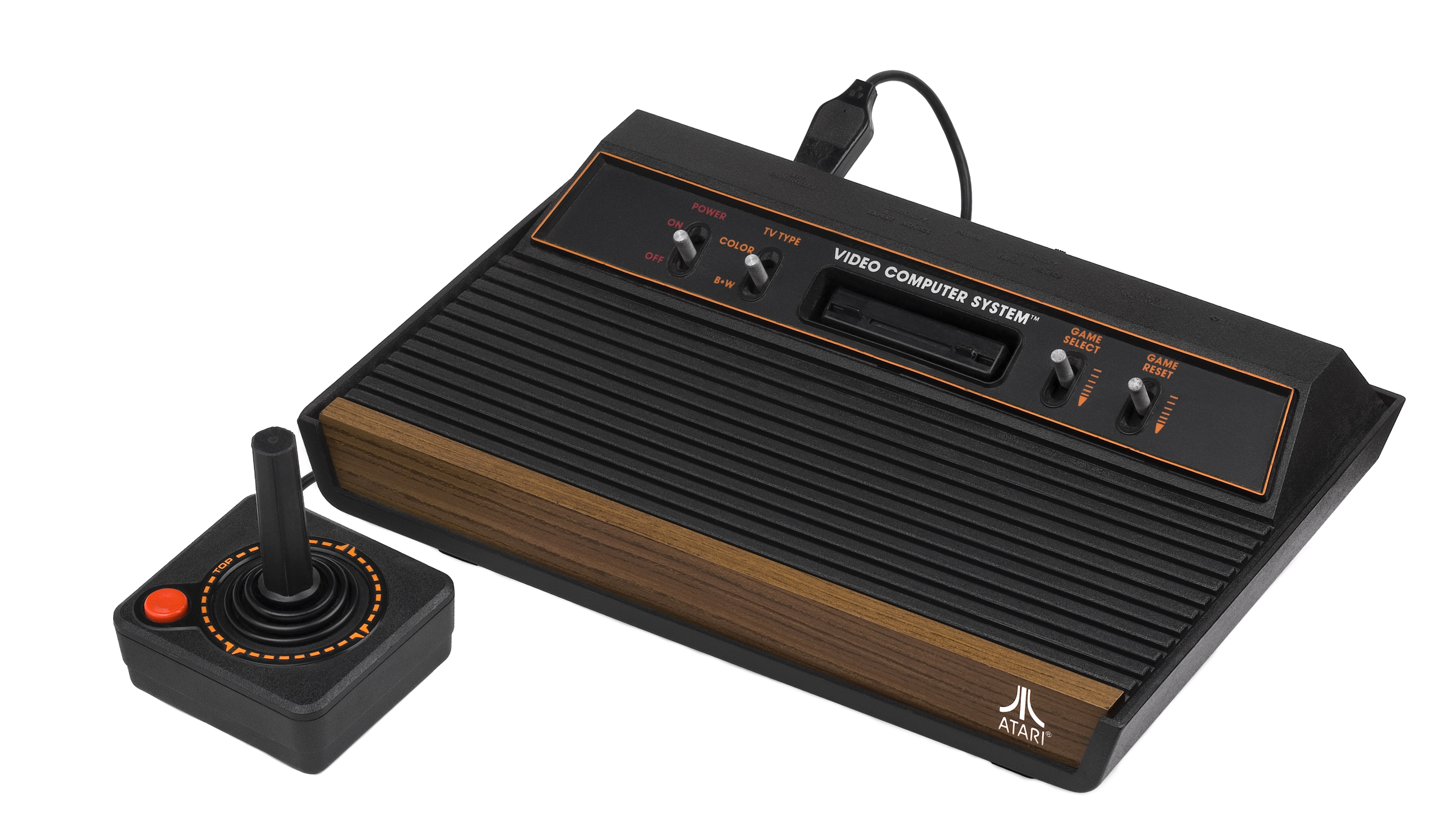
Along with controlling the game via the joystick, Starmaster required the players to use the "TV Type" switch on the Atari 2600 console to load the MACC menu.

To remove damage, the player must travel to a sector with a starbase and dock which will restore their energy and repair any damage done to their ship. Enemy starfighters are continuously attempting to surround and destroy starbases. When they succeed in taking over a starbase, an explosion is heard and the starbase disappears from the map. When entering an enemy sector, the player will have a gunsight represented by a crosshair shaped like an x. The player must destroy enemy starfighters by firing lasers from their ship in the fastest amount of time all while conserving energy. Each laser shot drains 100 units of energy while being hit by an enemy can drain 100 to 500 units of energy. The sector is cleared once control console turns from red to green.

The game ends when the player runs out of energy, all enemies' ships are destroyed or the player's ship is destroyed. When the mission is over, the top line of the MACC screen displays an evaluation based on how what difficulty level the played, how many enemies were destroyed, how many starbases remain, and how fast the player reached their end goal.

== Development ==
Starmaster was designed by Alan Miller for Activision. Miller had previously developed games at Atari, Inc. such as Surround (1977), Hangman (1978) and Basketball (1978). After leaving Atari, Inc. to form Activision with David Crane, Miller made the games Checkers (1980), Tennis (1981) and Ice Hockey (1981).

For his next game Starmaster, Miller described being influenced by Cosmic Conflict! (1978) for the Magnavox Odyssey². He believed he could improve on realism of that game's space flight by having the stars move towards the player. In a 2003 interview with Digital Press, Miller said he was also inspired by Doug Neubauer's game Star Raiders (1980) for the Atari 8-bit computers, saying he "sought to replicate that feeling of flying through space on the much more limited Atari 2600." Miller said the game took about four to five months to complete. Activision employee Jessica Stevens said that Miller had spent months making the stars look correct in Starmaster.

== Release ==
Starmaster was released in June 1982. Activision president Jim Levy predicted high sales comparable to Pac-Man (1982) for Starmaster in May 1982. In The Video Game Update, readers were asked about their favorite console games. Starmaster was included as receiving multiple mentions without cracking the top five most mentioned titles. By 1983, it became Miller's most commercially successful game.

Starmaster was included in the compilation titles Activision Anthology (2002) for PC, PlayStation 2, and Game Boy Advance and in Activision Hits Remixed (2006) for the PlayStation Portable. Atari teased a large announcement on August 20, 2026 which was revealed a re-release of several Activision games for the Atari 2600. This included Starmaster set for a mid-2027 release.

== Reception ==
Reception

Review scores
Publication	Score
AllGame	4/5
The Fresno Bee	A

The Video Game Update stated that along with Chopper Command, Starmaster were the best new releases of the month and that Starmaster was the "a game to challenge the most sophisticated player, with enough features to make total mastery a long-term proposition."

Bill Kunkel and Arnie Katz of Electronic Games noted the familiarity of the game noting it belonged to the "Trek" genre of games which had dozens of titles, but was an achievement for its richness for an Atari 2600 game. The reviewers concluded that the game had staying power due to its wide range of play possibilities. Tim Onosko of The Capital Times saw the influence of the computer game Star Raiders had on Miller's game, but found it far more satisfying than the Atari 2600 version of the game, being visually superior to the Atari 2600 port and more challenging than other similar games such as Phaser Patrol (1982).

In 1983, at the Fourth Annual Arcade Awards, along with Atlantis (1982) it won a "Certificate of Merit" in the "Videogame of the Year" category. Demon Attack (1982) won the main award.

From retrospective reviews, Skyler Miller of AllGame and Brett Alan Weiss in his book Classic Home Video Games 1972-1984 said that the game was superior to the Atari 2600 port of Star Raiders (1982). and that despite simple graphics and only one type of enemy, it was "easily the best space combat simulation for the Atari 2600." Weiss echoed these statements saying that the game was a "a must-have for fans of the genre" specifically highlighting its gameplay.

== See also ==
- List of Atari 2600 games
- List of Activision games: 1980–1999
