= Starmaster (disambiguation) =

Starmaster is a video game featuring space combat simulation written for the Atari 2600 by Alan Miller and published in 1982 by Activision.

Starmaster may also refer to:

- Starmaster (play-by-mail game), a play-by-mail game that was published by Schubel & Son
- StarMaster, a computer game in the series Trade Wars
