= David Crane's Amazing Tennis =

1992 video game

- Genesis cover art
- Developers: Absolute Entertainment; FarSight Technologies (Genesis)
- Publisher: Absolute Entertainment
- Designer: David Crane
- Composer: Mark Van Hecke
- Platforms: Super NES, Sega Genesis
- Release: Super NES: NA: October 1992; EU: 1992; Genesis: NA: May 1993
- Genre: Sports (tennis)
- Modes: Single-player, multiplayer

David Crane's Amazing Tennis is a 1992 tennis video game published by Absolute Entertainment for the Super Nintendo Entertainment System and Sega Genesis consoles. The game was also made available for the Nintendo Super System. The SNES version got a worldwide release, while the Genesis version only saw a North American release.

The game was designed by an expert in the sport, as the titular David Crane was an avid tennis player. He had played tournaments as well as playing in doubles with Activision co-founder Alan Miller, but stated he never had interest in developing a tennis-themed game until then.

== Gameplay ==
The player prepares to serve

David Crane's Amazing Tennis simulates the men's singles game across three set matches, the game is viewed from behind the player. Clay, grass and hard courts are available, and the player can specify handedness. There are a selection of fictional computer controlled opponents available, each with different strengths, and a two player local multiplayer option is available. Players can perform various shots, such as topspin, backspin, lob and drop shots.

== Reception ==
Reception

Aggregate score
Aggregator	Score
GameRankings	70% (SNES)

Review scores
Publication	Score
AllGame	1.5/5
Electronic Gaming Monthly	6/10, 7/10, 7/10, 5/10
Mega	71/100
N-Force	86/100
Super Play	80/100

The game enjoyed a positive critical reception. The presentation was lauded; Super Play described the impression of a 3D court as "the most realistic yet for this type of game", described the sound effects as tremendous, and praised the inclusion of slow motion replays. Nintendo Power had similar thoughts on the sounds, and found that the "digitized voice of the scorekeeper and excellent sound effects added to the realism". N-Force praised the large and detailed sprites as well as the quality of animation.

Rob Millichamp of N-Force described the perspective as "innovative and awesome", but it was a point of contention between critics. Mega felt the viewpoint made play confusing and difficult, while Super Play felt it made seeing where the ball was being served tricky. Both described it as the biggest detriment to the game. A concern shared by many of the critics, was the difficulty in controlling the player on the far side of the court. Due to the viewpoint and perspective of the game, the far side player sprite is significantly smaller compared to the near side player. N-Force felt this made hitting the ball a nightmare, while Super Play stated that serving and receiving from that end is "too tricky".

Despite the criticism, reviews generally found the game enjoyable. Ed Semrad of EGM suggested that the game was "easily one of the best" tennis games, and N-Force called it "an amazing leap forward in tennis sims". Super Play concluded that although polished and enjoyable, it was not as good as Super Tennis, a previously released tennis game.

From a retrospective review, Brett Alan Weiss of Allgame said the game's graphics and animations were high quality, but the point-of-view made it hard to see some shots and the other side of the tennis court which makes it hard to see certain shots as well as the other side of the playfield. He concluded that the POV and the games unresponsive controls marred the game beyond any recommendation.
