= Basketball (disambiguation) =

Basketball is a sport in which a ball is bounced and thrown through a hoop.

Basketball may also refer to:

- Basketball (ball), the ball used in the sport

== Gaming ==
- Basketball (1974 video game), also known as TV Basketball, a game by Taito
- Basketball (1978 video game), a game for the Atari 2600
- Basketball (1979 video game), an arcade game by Atari, Inc.
- Basketball (1980 video game), a game for the Intellivision system

== Music ==
- "Basketball" (song), a song by Kurtis Blow, notably covered by Lil' Bow Wow
- Basketball, a minor musical side project of Adam Young, Andy Johnson, and Anthony Johnson

== Television and film ==
- "Basketball" (Balamory), a 2002 television episode
- "Basketball" (The Office), an episode of the American version of The Office
- "Basketball", an episode of the Indian TV series Dhoom Machaao Dhoom
- "Basketball", an episode of the television series Modern Family
- "Basketball", an episode of the television series Teletubbies
- Basketball, a character from the fourth season of Battle for Dream Island, an animated web series
- BASEketball, a 1998 comedy American film

== Other uses ==
- "Basketball", a successor project to the U.S. government's Total Information Awareness surveillance program
- Basket-Ball (magazine), a magazine published by the French Federation of Basketball
