= Transformers: The Battle to Save the Earth =

1986 video game

The Transformers: Battle to Save the Earth
- Developer: Activision
- Publisher: Activision
- Designer: David Crane
- Platform: Commodore 64
- Release: NA: 1986
- Genre: Action role-playing
- Mode: Single-player

The Transformers The Computer Game Vol. 1: Battle to Save the Earth is an action role-playing game released by Activision in 1986, based on the popular Transformers animated series. The game was released for the Commodore 64 in Datasette and floppy disk formats. It was the first Transformers game by Activision, which subsequently published more games for the franchise over two decades later.

== Gameplay ==
Players are shown a map with nine key sites that the Decepticons plan to attack. The objective is to move an Autobot to a location to do battle with invading Decepticon forces.

Once the Autobot reaches the location, the player switches to first-person view to shoot down the Decepticons and prevent them from stealing valuable resources and building their ultimate weapon. In the middle of the game, the Decepticons steal a mechanical Tyrannosaurus from Dinosaur Park, using a nuclear rod they stole from the nuclear power plant cooling tower, and send it towards the shuttle base. The player must attempt to prevent the dinosaur robot from destroying the Space Shuttle in the complex. After destroying the Space Shuttle, the Decepticons attempt to steal the cosmic dust that is left behind, as well as a laser from a research facility. The Decepticons then move onto the zoo to use the enhanced laser on the hippo exhibit to make it into a giant hippo, and it is sent to the pipe junction. Once the hippo arrives at the pipe junction it destroys it, and the game ends.

Points are accumulated by the Autobots by destroying the Decepticons as they attempt to steal resources, while Decepticons gain points for successfully stealing resources. Whichever side, Autobots or Decepticons, have the highest resource points at the end of the game, wins. A medal is awarded to the player depending on their performance.

== Characters ==
There are a total of eight Autobot characters to control; each with a designated number as shown on the game's map screen, including Bumblebee, Cliffjumper and Blurr. Rodimus and Hot Rod appear in the game as separate characters, despite the fact that they are the same character.

== Versions ==
The game was released in two versions; floppy disk and cassette.

The floppy disk version features an introductory sequence describing the back story of the Transformers with sampled speech narration and loads the "transformation" animations from disk in game.

The cassette version however omits the introductory sequence and gives the player the option to choose which of the Transformer characters' animations should be shown during gameplay - the transformation sequence for this character alone will be shown and all other characters' map screen icons merely change colour to indicate robot or vehicle mode. The cassette version also crashes when the player reaches a certain point in the game (the "Pipeline Junction") meaning that the game is not completable on this format.
