= Captain Novolin =

1992 educational platform video game

- Packaging artwork
- Developers: Sculptured Software
- Publisher: Raya Systems
- Director: Perry Rodgers
- Designer: Perry Rodgers
- Programmers: Spencer Shellman; Steve Aguirre; Cosmo Conder
- Artist: Kelly Kofoed
- Composers: H. Kingsley Thurber; Mark Ganus
- Platform: SNES
- Release: NA: November 1992
- Genres: Educational, platform
- Mode: Single-player

Captain Novolin is a 1992 educational platform video game, developed by Sculptured Software and published by Raya Systems for the Super Nintendo Entertainment System. Starring the eponymous superhero with type 1 diabetes, the game sees the player control Captain Novolin on a quest to save the mayor of Pineville from the supervillain Blubberman. It is a part of educational video game series from Raya that also includes Rex Ronan: Experimental Surgeon, Packy and Marlon, and Bronkie the Bronchiasaurus.

Funding for the game came from Novo (makers of the Novolin brand of insulin) and the National Institutes of Health. To promote the game, Novo distributed 10,000 free copies to hospitals. During its initial release, the game was positively received by diabetes specialists, as well as children with the condition. But reception from both contemporary and retrospective video game critics has been poor, and it has been named as one of the worst video games of all time.

== Gameplay and plot ==
Typical gameplay of Captain Novolin, with an enemy soda heading towards the superhero.

Captain Novolin is a 2D side-scrolling platformer. The plot has the titular diabetic hero setting out to save Pineville's diabetic Mayor Gooden from aliens and their leader Blubberman, as the mayor only has enough insulin for 48 hours.

Before the game starts, a doctor and dietitian give advice on how to manage one's diet and insulin. Throughout the game, Captain Novolin has to avoid the alien invaders, who have the appearance of junk food items, such as "Cereal Killer" and "Larry Licorice". Meanwhile, Captain Novolin must eat healthy meals to keep his blood glucose within a safe zone. Captain Novolin will die if his blood glucose level exceeds or depletes below a certain amount. Players can earn points by keeping Novolin's glucose level in the safe zone and defeating the enemy aliens, while receiving bonus points by correctly answering questions that relate to diabetes. In addition, the game has a feature whereby a diabetic player can specify the frequency of their real-life insulin injections.

== Development and release ==
Captain Novolin was published by Mountain View, California-based company Raya Systems. The President and founder of Raya, Steve Brown, had previously worked with medical companies, supplying them software applications. His interactions with these companies had led him to the conclusion that there needed to be a new way to give children medical information, including about diabetes. The company teamed up with Novo to fund the game, as did the National Institutes of Health. Novo also helped design the titular character. Sculptured Software developed for the game. Their previous titles included Super Star Wars and NCAA Basketball.

The game was unveiled in June 1992 at the 52nd American Diabetes Association meeting. Novo distributed 10,000 free copies of the game to hospitals in the United States. It was also shown at diabetes summer camps across the US. The game was released for the Super Nintendo Entertainment System in November 1992, exclusively in North America. It is the first game about diabetes self-management. Subsequent games promoting self-management include 2003's Diabetes Education for Kids for computers and Japanese exclusives Detective and Buildup Blocks for the Game Boy Advance in 2004. Captain Novolin is the first entry in Raya Systems' "Hero Health" series, with later games focusing on tobacco (Rex Ronan: Experimental Surgeon), asthma (Bronkie the Bronchiasaurus), and diabetes once again (Packy and Marlon). By the end of 1992, Captain Novolin had sold about 10,000 copies.

== Evaluations ==
Captain Novolin was warmly received among children with diabetes and their parents. In one study, 23 diabetic children (10 boys and 13 girls in the age range of 6 to 16 years) and the parent of one child were interviewed individually. The children were enthusiastic about the game, with several saying that it would be useful when telling their friends about diabetes. A separate evaluation involved a number of diabetic children aged from 8 to 14, along with their respective parents. Participants said that the game could help parents and children to talk about diabetes, as well as helping children talk to their friends about the subject. Former Cheers cast member John Ratzenberger, a celebrity volunteer for the Juvenile Diabetes Foundation, thought the game was fun, feeling that it taught children how to manage their diabetes.

== Reception ==
Reception

Review scores
Publication	Score
Super Action	47%
Super Control	32%
Super Pro	26%

Contemporary reception to Captain Novolin was negative. Import reviews from British magazines gave the game low marks. Super Control, while not wanting to criticize the game from an educational stance, considered it to be one of the worst games they had ever seen. Super Pro was negative towards the graphics, sound effects, and gameplay, with the reviewer concluding it to be one of the most annoying and tedious games they ever played. Super Action questioned how they could critique the game due to its intentions being about diabetes education, but ultimately concluded the game to be dull and would only consider it a good game if a doctor gave it out for free. Esquire magazine included Captain Novolin with their "Dubious Achievement Awards of 1992“, mocking the game's concept and sarcastically preferring "Super Prozac Brothers".

Retrospective reception of the game was widely negative; it was called one of the worst video games of all time. Reviewing Captain Novolin for Hardcore Gaming 101, Charles P. Gill, criticizing its gameplay, graphics, and sound, considered it "so bad that it's really, really funny". Matthew Williamson for GameSetWatch was negative towards the size of the Captain Novolin sprite, saying that it took up one-third of the screen. Williamson also called the Captain "possibly the worst super hero ever", noting the character could only attack while in mid-air. Writers for Diabetes.co.uk also found unintentional humor in the game, made funnier, they said, by its US$60 retail price. Electronic Gaming Monthly's Seanbaby placed it as number 4 in his "20 worst games of all time" feature and was quoted saying, "The game is so bad you'll start to root for diabetes." K. Thor Jensen for UGO called it one of the worst educational games of all time, while Robert Quigley and Susana Polo from The Mary Sue named it as one of the weirdest. Game Informer's Ben Reeves considered it to be one of the strangest corporate mascots to get their own video game. Time Extension's Damien McFerran listed Captain Novolin as one of the worst SNES games, while Club Nintendo México called it the second worst game on a Nintendo console.
