= Bruce Davis (video game industry) =

American businessman

- Education: University at Albany, SUNY; Columbia University J.D.
- Occupation: CEO

Bruce L. Davis (born 1952) is an American businessman, most recently CEO and chairman of Digimarc. Formerly the head of both Imagic and Activision.

== Early life and education ==
A native of New York, Davis earned a B.S. in accounting and psychology and an M.A. in criminal justice from the University at Albany, SUNY, and a J.D. degree from Columbia University. Davis completed a PhD in criminal justice in April 2024. His dissertation, entitled "Indecent Exposure and the Court as Custos Morum," is a seminal work on the courts as custodians of morals in America. The dissertation was honored with the University at Albany Distinguished Dissertation Award for 2024.

== Career ==
Davis began his professional career by establishing the intellectual property practice at the firm of Orrick, Herrington & Sutcliffe in San Francisco, California. He assumed leadership of Imagic as it was going out of business in the video game crash of 1983.

From 1987 to 1991, Davis was first chief operating officer, then chairman and CEO of Activision. The board of directors promoted him from senior vice president to replace Jim Levy shortly after the acquisition of Infocom, in the hopes of stemming the continuing financial damage from the crash. He had opposed the merger, and many Infocom employees believed he was deliberately working against them, changing processes that had made the game business successful. Activision co-founder and programmer David Crane was also critical of Davis: "Bruce Davis' biggest mistake was treating video games as commodities, rather than creative products." Nevertheless, Davis's leadership of Activision began well. He led the company to a profit in his first year at the helm on strong sales growth, following 16 consecutive quarters of multimillion-dollar losses. The turnaround effort was stymied after a huge damages award for infringement of Magnavox's original home video game patents was upheld on appeal in 1988. That year Activision changed its name to Mediagenic, as Davis sought to expand the company's product lines to non-gaming software. In February 1991, Bobby Kotick, backed by Steve Wynn of Mirage Resorts, staged a successful hostile takeover. Kotick and his team then filed a Chapter 11 bankruptcy in cooperation with Magnavox parent company Philips in a leveraged recapitalization of Activision, as it was renamed in 1992. Kotick replaced Davis in this restructuring.

Starting in 1992, Davis founded and served as president of TV Guide on Screen, a joint venture of News Corporation and TCI that supplied electronic guides and navigational software for the cable television market. The company later merged with Prevue Networks, then with TV Guide. TV Guide later merged with Gemstar International. The resulting Gemstar-TV Guide International was acquired in 2008 by Macrovision.

Davis was the chairman and CEO of Digimarc until 2021. He led Digimarc from start up in 1997 to a more than US$100 million public company supplying digital watermarking technologies to national and state governments and to the media industry. In April 2021, Davis retired from his role as chairman and CEO of Digimarc.

Davis has been awarded more than 100 patents on television user interface and media management and security. In 2003, Davis was named Ernst & Young's Pacific Northwest Entrepreneur Of The Year for the technology category.
