= Ice hockey (disambiguation) =

Ice hockey is a team sport played on ice.

Ice hockey may also refer to:

- Ice Hockey (1981 video game), a video game for the Atari 2600
- Ice Hockey (1988 video game), a video game by Nintendo
- Hockey on the ice, an old name for the team sport bandy
