= Packy and Marlon =

1995 video game

Packy & Marlon
- Developer: WaveQuest
- Publishers: Raya Systems (SNES); Kidz Health Software (PC)
- Platforms: SNES; Microsoft Windows
- Release: SNES: NA: June 1995; PC: NA: 1998
- Genres: Educational, platformer
- Mode: Single-player

Packy & Marlon is an educational platform video game developed by WaveQuest and published by Raya Systems for the Super Nintendo Entertainment System. It was designed to improve self-care behavior in children with type 1 diabetes. The game achieved some success with treatment groups. It is a part of educational video game series from Raya that includes Captain Novolin, Rex Ronan: Experimental Surgeon and Bronkie the Bronchiasaurus.

In 1998, the game was released for personal computers by Kidz Health Software.

== Gameplay ==
A gang of rats has invaded Camp Wa-kee, and stolen the food and medical supplies, hiding them in different areas of the Camp. As such, Packy and Marlon, two diabetic elephants, are tasked with retrieving the stolen goods and clearing out the malicious rodents, while also remembering to take their insulin and check their blood glucose. At the end of the game they face the evil bosses Veets and Yebur of the Lunch Room Crew.

== Legacy ==
"Packy and Marlon was designed to help remove the stigma of being different so young people with diabetes who played the game with their friends, and saw that their friends did not consider diabetes to be a big issue, would be more willing to do important self-care throughout the day, even when their friends were around. And this is what actually happened".

— Debra Lieberman, Packy and Marlon designer

The game is important in the history of therapeutic gaming, a concept that originated in the mid-1990s with games such as this and the asthma-focused Bronkie the Bronchiasaurus. A six-month study undertaken in 1997 on behalf of Click Health by researchers at Stanford University's Medical Center on 59 diabetic children ages 8 to 16 found that, after playing the game, the children were four times less likely to require urgent care visits than children who had played other games. A three-month study found that for kids with diabetes, the game "decreased their diabetes-related emergency room and urgent care visits by 77 percent". The game was also tested in Kaiser hospitals, where it was shown to have given important information to diabetics, while also encouraging the patients to offer support to each other.

== See also ==
- Packy (elephant)
