= Soccer (1982 video game) =

1982 video game

- Publisher: Gamma Software
- Platform: Atari 8-bit
- Release: 1982
- Genre: Sports

Soccer is a sports video game for Atari 8-bit computers published in 1982 by Gamma Software.

== Gameplay ==
Soccer is a sports game in which 2-4 players compete in an arcade-style game.

== Reception ==
Allen Doum reviewed the game for Computer Gaming World, and stated that "The graphics are of the kind that leave George Plimpton flat. For those who like the arcade style sports games, these games fall short of what the computer is capable of. However, as two-player sports games, they can be exciting." Bill Kunkel wrote a lukewarm review for Electronic Games which leads off with:

Gamma's second entry into the otherwise empty computer sports simulations market, while not a total rave-up, at least shows considerable improvement over their debut program (the inept Hockey).
