= Fishing derby =

Fishing derby may refer to:

- Fishing tournament, a fishing contest among a group of anglers
- Fishing Derby, an Atari 2600 video game
