= Alan Miller (game designer) =

American video game designer and programmer

Alan Miller is an American video game designer and programmer and entrepreneur. He developed games for the Atari Video Computer System at Atari, Inc., then left in 1979 to co-found third-party video game developer Activision.

== Career ==
Miller studied electrical engineering and computer science at the University of California, Berkeley, graduating in 1973.

Miller joined Atari, Inc. in February 1977 and was one of the first four Atari 2600 game designers. His 2600 titles include Surround, Hangman and Basketball. With others, he co-authored the operating system for the Atari 400/800 computers in late 1978 and early 1979. His last game for Atari, Basketball, was one of the first ROM games for the Atari computers. Miller did not work on any Atari 2600 cartridges during his last year with Atari.

In late 1979, Miller left Atari with three other programmers, David Crane, Larry Kaplan and Bob Whitehead. They were disillusioned and disappointed with Atari's refusal to give them screen credit for any of the games they worked on. With music industry executive, Jim Levy, they formed Activision, the first independent video game developer and publisher. Activision rapidly grew to US$159 million in revenue in 1983, its third year of sales. Miller acted as Vice President of Product Development and designed several of the company's first games. Among his games designed while with Activision are Checkers, Tennis, Ice Hockey, Starmaster and Robot Tank. Miller experimented with implementing a 3D display for the game Checkers but due to technical limitations of both the Atari 2600 and television sets of the era, the idea was dropped.

Miller and Whitehead thought that diversification to other platforms, such as the home computers like the Commodore 64, was essential for success. Activision was resistant to this idea, so he and Whitehead left Activision in 1984 and together formed the game publisher Accolade. While with his new company, he designed only one game, Law of the West for the Commodore 64. Miller started as Vice President of Product Development but in a few years rose to chairman and CEO.

After ten years at Accolade, Miller left in 1994. Accolade hit hard times and in 1999 was purchased by Infogrames, which later changed its subsidiaries' names to Atari, Atari Europe, Atari Australia, and Atari Japan respectively.

In September 2001, Miller rejoined David Crane at Crane's company, Skyworks Technologies, a leading developer of custom branded online games (advergames) for Fortune 100 companies, where he was Vice President of Business Development for four years.

== Click Health ==
In 1997, Miller co-founded Click Health, a pioneering publisher of health education games for children with asthma and diabetes. The games were made available for Nintendo consoles and IBM PCs. Miller was chairman and CEO. Clinical trials of the company's games demonstrated significant effectiveness. In a clinical trial with pediatric diabetes patients at Stanford University Medical Center and Kaiser Permanente, children who played the company's diabetes game, Packy and Marlon, experienced a 77% reduction in urgent care visits over six months, compared to children in the control group who were given a standard video game to play. The company's anti-smoking game, Rex Ronan: Experimental Surgeon, is an interactive exhibit in the Health Odyssey Museum at the Centers for Disease Control headquarters in Atlanta, Georgia, played by thousands of children each year as they tour the museum.

Unable to find significant interest in distribution of the effective games through health care providers, insurers, and government agencies, Click Health closed its doors in September 2001.
