= Hockey (1981 video game) =

1981 video game

- Developer: Gamma Software
- Publisher: Gamma Software
- Platform: Atari 8-bit
- Release: 1981
- Genre: Sports

Hockey is an ice hockey video game published by Gamma Software for Atari 8-bit computers in 1981. Gamma released the Atari 8-bit game Soccer the following year.

== Gameplay ==
Hockey is a sports game in which 2-4 players compete in an arcade-style game.

== Reception ==
Bill Willett, writing for his "Atari Arcade" column in the June 1982 issue of Computer Gaming World, called Hockey "a delight to play". Later that year, also in CGW, Allen Doum stated:

The graphics are of the kind that leave George Plimpton flat. For those who like the arcade style sports games, these games fall short of what the computer is capable of. However, as two-player sports games, they can be exciting.

The reviewers in the 1983 book The Creative Atari called the game, "almost fast, never furious, and generally fun". The primary complaint was the slow movement speed of the players.

In Electronic Games, Bill Kunkel wrote:

In any case, Gamma's version misses the level of realism attained in Activision's programmable version for the VCS, by quite a bit. The players are drawn much too large for the cramped, on-screen rink. Due to the lack of space, the sport's primary characteristic, speed, is obliterated.

He also disliked the minimal feedback when a goal is scored.

== See also ==
- Ice Hockey for the Atari 2600
