= Bronkie the Bronchiasaurus =

1995 video game

- Developer(s): WaveQuest
- Publisher(s): Raya Systems
- Designer(s): Gabriel B. Manriquez
- Programmer(s): Donald E Cherf Jr
- Composer(s): John Bartlet
- Platform(s): SNES
- Release: NA: September 1995
- Genre(s): Educational, platform
- Mode(s): Single-player, multiplayer

Bronkie the Bronchiasaurus is an educational platform video game developed by American studio WaveQuest and published by Raya Systems for the Super Nintendo Entertainment System. It is a part of educational video game series from Raya that includes Captain Novolin, Rex Ronan: Experimental Surgeon and Packy and Marlon.

== Gameplay and plot ==
The game attempts to teach children about asthma. Years ago, meteors struck the prehistoric city of San Saurian. The explosions covered the earth with clouds of dust, thus causing asthma in the dinosaur world. The dinosaurs built a mighty wind machine to clear the air, but their plans were thwarted by Mr. Rexo, who stole the machine, hid its pieces over San Saurian and forced other dinosaurs to protect them. The two friends, Bronkie and Trakie, with the help of their sidekicks, Sam and Kyla, must find the missing machine parts before the dust returns and save the planet. Bronkie and Trakie can develop shortness of breath from tar, cigarette smoke, furry animals, and other obstacles. Bonus games include learning the proper use of the inhaler and other daily facts of life for people with asthma.

== Evaluations ==
Researchers at Stanford University Medical Center conducted a study with 200 children with asthma from Oakland and Washington playing Bronkie the Bronchiasaurus.

== Reception ==
JC Fletcher for Engadget considered the game to be overlooked and argued that it should be added to the Wii's Virtual Console solely for being "hilarious".
