= Law of the West =

1985 video game

- Developers: Accolade; Tose (Famicom)
- Publishers: NA: Accolade; EU: U.S. Gold; JP: Pony Inc.; American Action (Scandinavia)
- Designer: Alan Miller
- Composer: Ed Bogas
- Platforms: Commodore 64, Apple II, Famicom, PC-88
- Release: NA/EU: 1985 (C64); NA: 1986 (Apple II); JP: 1987 (Famicom, PC-88)
- Genre: Adventure
- Mode: Single-player

Law of the West is a 1985 graphic adventure set in the American Old West developed by Accolade for the Commodore 64, Apple II, and Family Computer. It was one of the company's launch titles and the only game from Accolade designed by co-founder Alan Miller. Graphics are by Mimi Doggett and music by Ed Bogas. It was published by American Action in Scandinavia, by U.S. Gold in other parts of Europe, and by Pony Inc. in Japan.

== Gameplay ==
The entirety of the game happens in a small frontier town, and the player takes the role of the town's Sheriff. The scenes are located along the town's main street, with a view from behind the Sheriff's back (the view is so close that only the Sheriff's waist, right arm, and gun are visible). Various other characters appear on the main street in front of the Sheriff.

The actual gameplay mostly involves the Sheriff interacting with the various characters via a selection menu similar to those in contemporary graphical adventures. For each line the opposing character says, the game offers a selection of four different responses, and the discussion progresses depending on the chosen response.

Depending on the outcome of a discussion, the Sheriff may get involved in a gunfight. In this case, the gameplay becomes a test of pure shooting skills, as the Sheriff has to shoot his opponent before getting shot himself. Gunplay is accomplished by pushing up on the joystick to draw the weapon, which causes a joystick-controlled crosshairs to appear on the screen. The various characters will react if the Sheriff draws his gun before they have a chance to say their opening line, usually refusing to speak until the gun is put away.

If the Sheriff gets shot, he blacks out, and the doctor is called to help. Depending on the Sheriff's previous interaction with the doctor and the other characters in the game (and if the doctor is in town), he may either be healed, or left for dead (either by the doctor refusing to help or the doctor being drunk at the time). The only goal of the game is for the player to survive until the end of the day; if the player wishes he can gun down every character he meets without talking to them, albeit this will be reflected negatively in the final score.

=== Scoring ===
The game ends when the Sheriff is shot and the Doctor does not heal him, or when the sun sets after 11 scenarios. The player is then presented with a final score, which is based on various factors such as how the player dealt with the characters, how many crimes they prevented, and even their success with the ladies.

If the player chose to shoot everybody, they will receive the lowest possible score.

== Characters ==
Characters interacted with in the game include:

- Belle – A female cattle rustler.
- Little Willy – A kid with a secret to tell.
- The Deputy – Never there to help you; challenges the Sheriff's authority.
- The Doctor – Grumpy and cynical, the Doctor will not heal the Sheriff if he is too trigger-happy.
- The Mexicali Kid – A fugitive from across the border.
- Miss April – A schoolteacher who enjoys spreading gossip.
- Miss Rose – The Saloon hostess; tries to seduce the Sheriff.

== Locations ==
The game takes place in the town of Gold Gulch. There are four different locations in the town:

- The Saloon
- The Wells Fargo stagecoach office
- The train station
- The bank

== Reception ==
Law of the West has received mixed reviews from game critics. Zzap!64 found the game to be initially impressive, with striking graphics and a strong atmosphere. However, it was thought to be too short and limited to have lasting appeal. It was given an overall rating of 78%.
