= Checkers (1980 video game) =

- Developer: Activision
- Publisher: Activision
- Designer: Alan Miller
- Platform: Atari 2600
- Release: July 1980
- Genre: Board game
- Modes: Single-player, multiplayer

Checkers is a 1980 video game adaptation of the board game checkers. It was designed by Alan Miller and was one of the first video games released by Activision, a company Miller and David Crane made after leaving Atari in August 1979.

The game simulates the board game, keeping its general rules. Players move their game pieces diagonally across a checkerboard one square at a time. If the player is diagonally next to an opposing player's checker, they must jump it, which removes the opponent's checker from the board. Once one player has successfully removed all other players checkers or the opponent can make no legal moves, the player wins. The game can be played at three difficulty levels against the computer or against a human-controlled opponent. Released in 1980, it was among the first releases from Activision.

A contemporary review in Video complimented the game, but found the computer opponents rarely made decisive moves to win a game when it was in their favour. A retrospective review by author Brett Alan Weiss compared the game to Atari's Video Checkers (1980), saying it was superior in terms of graphics, control and had faster-moving computer opponents, but lacked the variety of gameplay options and difficulty as Atari's games.

== Gameplay ==
The player uses an "x" to select which checker they will move on their turn.

Checkers is an adaptation of the board game Checkers. The game keeps the basic rules of the original board game intact. The player controls their uniquely colored gameplay pieces, called checkers, by moving a flashing "x" across the checker they wish to move. Once selected, the player may move the checker forward diagonally across one square of the checkerboard per turn. Exceptions of this are made when a player has the opportunity to jump an opposing checker. If there is an option to jump an opposing checker, the player must do so. If more than one option to jump is available, the player may choose which one to make the jump.. If one player jumps an opponent's checker, that jumped checker is removed from the board. If one checker manages to make it across the board, it becomes a king and can now move forward and backward across the board. If one player loses all their checkers or cannot make a legal move, that player loses the game. If both players only have one piece left, the game is considered a stalemate.

There are three difficulty modes in Checkers, the first three are playing against a computer player of novice, intermediate, and expert difficulty. A fourth game mode is a multiplayer mode where the player plays a second human opponent.

== Development ==
Checkers was developed by Alan Miller. Along with David Crane, Miller quit their jobs at Atari in August 1979. They had a plan to create an independent development and publishing company called Activision to produce games for Atari's Video Computer System video game console. In the manual of the game, Miller cited A. L. Samuels for "pioneering work in the field of computer artificial intelligence" as a source of inspiration to him.

The original plan for Activision was to release two titles in August and a further two in October 1980. Ahead of their target goal, the company released four games in July 1980. Checkers was published by Activision. It was among Activision's first games along with Dragster, Boxing, and Fishing Derby. Checkers was later included in the video game compilations, such as Activision Anthology (2002).

== Reception ==
Bill Kunkel and Frank Laney wrote in Video magazine that Checkers would give "about any checkers player a good tussle" while saying that the games' only weak point was the computer opponent lacked any "killer instinct" and would allow players to easily escape what could be an impending defeat.

In The Book of Atari Software 1983, Checkers was described as an "excellent implementation of the classic game", complimenting the graphics, the pacing the computer controlled opponent felt smart and was a real challenge to beat. Brett Weiss compared the game to Atari's Video Checkers in his book Classic Home Video Games 1972-1984 (2007). Weiss found Activision's game superior to Atari's version in terms of graphics due to gameplay perspective, and that the game pieces looked somewhat textured. Weiss also found Activision's game to have more responsive controls and that it took less time for the computer-controlled opponent to make their move. Weiss added that Video Checkers did offer more modes of play with it having nine skill levels opposed to three, and that it featured Giveaway checkers as a mode of play.

== See also ==
- List of Activision games: 1980–1999
