= Hunter (video game) =

1991 video game

- Developer: Activision
- Publisher: Activision
- Designer: Paul Holmes
- Programmer: Paul Holmes
- Artist: Jason Kingsley
- Composer: Martin Walker
- Platforms: Amiga, Atari ST
- Release: August 1991
- Genre: Action-adventure
- Mode: Single-player

Hunter is an early 3D action-adventure game in which the player navigates around a series of islands. Hunter was developed by Paul Holmes and Martin Walker (music), and was released by Activision for the Amiga and Atari ST home computers in 1991.

== Gameplay ==
Screenshot of Hunter

The player controls a soldier in a large three-dimensional world and can move by walking, swimming or using various vehicles ranging from cars to tanks to surfboards. The player may also enter and explore a variety of buildings.

Other in-game characters include enemy soldiers, civilians and animals such as seagulls, sharks and cows. The player has a range of weapons. Surrounding terrain can be surveyed with aerial observation units and radar. Food and money can be used to bribe and gather information from other characters. Target coordinates can be recorded into a log book, and the player's position in the game world can be seen on an overlaying map.

In addition to shooting, enemy soldiers can also drive vehicles to track the player down. Guard towers, tracer guns, cannons and SAM launchers have the ability to shoot towards the player, and homing missiles launched by the enemy follow the player's vehicles. Birds can also flock around the player, which can cause them to get killed by a vehicle.

The game is controlled mostly via joystick and mouse. The joystick controls the directional movement of the character, and the mouse is used in the selection of weapons and items.

=== Game modes ===
There are three game modes to choose from. Each mode has its own map:

- Hunter, an action-adventure game in which communication with other characters is important. The player's mission is to track down and assassinate an enemy general and return to headquarters before time runs out. The mission can be accomplished by collecting clues from civilians, bribing enemies and using various vehicles and weapons.
- In Missions mode, the player has to complete a short mission and then return to headquarters in order to receive another assignment. The objectives become progressively harder and the time shorter to complete each mission. The last mission is to destroy the enemy headquarters.
- Action, one large mission in which the player has to destroy a preset number of targets in any order he wishes. The player is given a long list of enemy targets and must use the map and log book to locate each target and destroy them before time runs out.

== Graphics and sound ==
The game world consists of a 3D polygon terrain with islands, hills and lakes. In addition to various buildings and vehicles, also some trees, plants and rocks are modeled in 3D. Use of colour is limited and shades of green, orange and blue are emphasized. The game features a 24-hour clock, and the brightness of the environment depends on the time of day. Flares can be used to illuminate the surroundings during night.

The only music in the game is the main theme composed by Martin Walker, which plays during the title screen. Sound effects include engines, gunfire, explosions, waves and squawks of seagulls. Typically the Amiga is both visually and sonically more advanced, using more colours and having digitized sound effects whereas the ST version uses more dithering (re: the ocean areas) and uses synthesized sound effects.

Hunter's maps are randomly generated each time the game is played, and are created using fractal geometry. After the map is generated, pre-made 3D objects are randomly placed in the game environment. Hunter has a total of 182 pre-made 3D objects.

== Development ==
Hunter began development in February 1990, and was originally planned for a February 1991 release date, but was delayed to August. The December 1990 issue of British gaming magazine The One previewed Hunter's development. Hunter's maps are randomly generated each time the game is played, and are created using fractal geometry. After the map is generated, pre-made 3D objects are randomly placed in the game environment. Hunter is 64 kilobytes large, and has a total of 182 pre-made 3D objects. The code for Hunter's 3D environments was written by Paul Holmes, and was originally intended for a game by CRL Group before they went defunct and the game was cancelled. This code, while used as a base, was "substantially rewritten" according to The One; the code relied on the Amiga's blitter chip, but due to Hunter's planned Atari ST release, this needed to be reworked. Holmes created software that mimiced the Amiga's blitter chip that was compatible with Atari ST hardware; the program turned out to run faster than the Amiga's blitter. Holmes said in an interview that "the trouble with using the hardware, is that it imposes certain limitations that then have to be overcome with clever software routines". The object editor created to design Hunter's 3D objects was written in a week, and Holmes expressed that writing Hunter's game logic and enemy AI was more difficult than the game's 3D routines. Hunter's maps are generated upon 128 by 128 grids, and the game runs at an average frame rate of 12 frames per second.

== Reception ==
Reception

Review scores
Publication	Score
Amiga Computing	90% (Amiga)
CU Amiga	89% (Amiga)
Amiga Format	86% (Amiga)
Amiga Power	85% (Amiga)

Hunter received very positive reviews (ranging from 85 to 95 points out of 100) in various game magazines. Although occasional graphical glitches and simplistic animation were noted, most of the reviewers considered Hunter one of the first serious takes on 3D gaming. The game was characterized as an innovative addition to 3D vector games and a bold step forward.

What gathered most attention, however, was the scope of the game and the freedom of movement inside the game world:

...regardless of which mission you are on there are no restrictions, apart from time, over how you do it. You can use whatever transport or equipment you like. This sense of freedom allows exploration and experimentation over transport and equipment mixes.

Although the missions have time-limits there are no constraints as to how you must complete them, and this flexibility is severely lacking in past attempts at accessible 3D games.

I loved the idea of controlling your character with freedom to travel around the various locations, using the various means of transport and going into buildings without so much as a "by your leave".

Although most reviewers were enthusiastic about the game world and its absorbing nature, some argued that the game world was small and could be explored in a few hours. Another aspect considered negative in the reviews was the lack of music and the quality of sound effects.

The combination of the game's 3D graphics and sandbox-type gameplay has been subsequently compared to the Grand Theft Auto and similar sandbox games, such as Far Cry 2.
