= Basketball (1979 video game) =

1979 video game

- Arcade flyer
- Developer: Atari, Inc.
- Publishers: Atari, Inc.
- Programmer: Chris Downend
- Platform: Arcade
- Release: NA: May 1979
- Genre: Sports
- Modes: Single-player, multiplayer

Basketball is an arcade video game released in May 1979 by Atari, Inc. It was the first basketball video game with a trackball for player movement and the first to use the angled side view which became a commonly used perspective in the basketball video games that followed.

== Gameplay ==
Single-player vs. computer

Basketball supports one and two player modes and uses a trackball to control each player's movement. At the start of each game, the song "Sweet Georgia Brown" is played. Players must first gain possession of the ball and move towards their opponent's goal. When in position for a shot, the pushbutton is held until the player's arm is at a suitable height and the button is released. Shots can be blocked by an opponent, and, when dribbling, an opponent can steal the ball. The winner is the player with the highest score when the clock runs out.

== Reception ==
Cashbox magazine praised the game for its fast action and realistic animated player characters. Basketball appeared in the top 10 video arcade games rankings for several months in 1979 according to Play Meter magazine.

== See also ==
- TV Basketball (1974) the first arcade basketball video game
- Basketball (1978 video game) for the Atari 2600
