= Rex Ronan: Experimental Surgeon =

1994 video game

- Developer: Sculptured Software
- Publisher: Raya Systems
- Designer: Craig Conder
- Composers: H. Kingsley Thurber; Mark Ganus
- Platform: SNES
- Release: NA: May 1994
- Genres: Educational, action
- Mode: Single-player

Rex Ronan: Experimental Surgeon is a 1994 educational action game developed by Sculptured Software and published by Raya Systems for the Super Nintendo Entertainment System (SNES). The game teaches players about the hazards of smoking tobacco cigarettes. The initial development of the game received support from the US Agency for Healthcare Research and Quality. It is a part of educational video game series from Raya that includes Captain Novolin, Packy and Marlon and Bronkie the Bronchiasaurus.

== Gameplay and premise ==
Rex Ronan: Experimental Surgeon gameplay. In this area, Rex Ronan (in purple) must blast tar off of Jake's teeth while dealing with attacking microbots.

Jake Westboro is a man with it all: a beautiful wife and child, a large house in the suburbs, and the massively-paying position of a major CEO for the Blackburn Tobacco Company. As a result of smoking since he was 15, however, Jake is now dying from the effects of the cigarettes that he once sold. An experimental surgeon, Rex Ronan, volunteers to shrink himself and a craft down to near-microscopic size, so he can travel inside of Jake's body and fight his various diseases; removing tar, leukoplakia, precancerous cells, plaque, a blood clot and nicotine. However, the tobacco company are concerned that, if Jake survives, he will speak to the world about the hazards of tobacco and accordingly ruin their business, so they secretly place microbots inside him en-masse in an attempt to stop Ronan from treating him. If Ronan dies from the evil killbots sent by the company, then so does the patient, Jake.

== Evaluations ==
Richard M. Satava mentioned two evaluations in which a number of children (none of whom were more than 12 years old) played a prototype version of the game. The average of the results indicated children who experienced enjoyment and who showed an interest with regard to acquiring information about tobacco's effects on people. According to Richard L. Street and Timothy R. Manning, the target audience was children and teenagers in the age range of 10 to 16 years. In addition, when it comes to persons who take up smoking, those in the age range of 10 to 16 years are at the highest risk, according to Street and Manning.
