= Diabetes.co.uk =

UK-based diabetes website

- Company type: Private
- Website type: Social networking, Internet forum, Community site
- Founded: 2001
- Headquarters: Coventry, {{{location_country}}}
- Key people: Arjun Panesar; Charlotte Summers; Barry Summers
- Website: diabetes.co.uk
- Launched: April 1, 2003
- Current status: Active

Diabetes.co.uk is a British-based website that offers news, information and resources on diabetes, describing itself as "Europe's largest community of people with diabetes".

The Diabetes Forum, is a patient network that aims to improve the health of people with diabetes, with a stated goal of connecting people with diabetes and providing a platform for diabetics to share their experiences, managing diabetes, and the associated complications.

== History ==
Diabetes.co.uk was founded in 2003, by Arjun Panesar after his grandfather was diagnosed with type 2 diabetes.

In March 2014, Diabetes.co.uk launched the hashtag #BloodSugarSelfie to raise awareness for diabetes through people posting selfies with their blood glucose readings. Promoted through social media, the campaign raised money for JDRF UK and was reported to have saved a life. In October 2015, the #BloodSugarSelfie campaign was recognised for the Best use of social media to deliver a health campaign.

The organisation runs the Diabetes Awareness Month each November in the UK, having done so since 2015.

=== Growth ===
The Diabetes Forum is Europe's largest diabetes forum.

Diabetes.co.uk was recognised as 'game-changing disruptors' in 2017's Maserati 100, an annual list published jointly between Maserati and The Sunday Times which celebrates and recognises "innovative entrepreneurs".

== Products and services ==
=== Publishing ===
Diabetes.co.uk publishes news, videos and information on diabetes and related industries daily.

=== Books ===
Reverse Your Diabetes: The Step-by-Step Plan to Take Control of Type 2 Diabetes is written by Dr David Cavan, ex-Director of Policy and Programmes at the International Diabetes Federation (IDF) and published by Random House. A second book, Reverse Your Diabetes Diet: The new eating plan to take control of type 2 diabetes, with 60 quick-and-easy recipes was published in March 2016.

=== Diabetes Forum ===
The Diabetes Forum is Europe's largest forum dedicated to diabetes.

In 2013, the forum was recognised by the UK Quality in Care (QiC) Awards Programme for improving self-management and diabetes care through social interaction.

The forum was cited as being popular in highlighting the adoption of a low carbohydrate diet as a way of achieving weight loss and improving HbA1c in patients with Type 2 Diabetes, despite the approach being 'generally frowned upon in the UK'.
