= Hangman (video game) =

1978 video game

- Box art by Susan Jaekel
- Developer: Atari, Inc.
- Publishers: Atari, Inc.
- Designer: Alan Miller
- Platform: Atari 2600
- Release: October 1978
- Genre: Puzzle
- Modes: Single-player, multiplayer

Hangman on the Atari 2600

Hangman is a puzzle video game based on the pen-and-paper game of the same name, released in 1978 by Atari, Inc. for the Atari VCS (renamed to the Atari 2600 in 1982).

== Development ==
The game was programmed by Alan Miller, who later cofounded Activision, with cover art by Susan Jaekel. The game was coded in assembly code.

== Gameplay ==
As in the traditional game of Hangman, the player must guess the letter of a hidden word, with each wrong guess resulting in a piece being added to the gallows. The game ends when either the gallows is completed or when the word has been fully guessed. The player can select from a range of four difficulty levels from first grade to high school. The words have a maximum length of six characters. Instead of the traditional man to be hanged being shown in the picture, a monkey is shown hanging from the gallows by its arm. Hangman contains 510 words divided into four difficulty levels. A timed mode where the player has to guess before a time limit expires is also available.

The game may be played in single-player mode, or in a two-player mode where players participate together. In one-player mode, the player has 11 attempts at guessing before the gallows is constructed. In two-player mode, guessing may continue until one player wins.

== Reception ==
Contemporary reviewers were unimpressed with the game. UK-based TV Gamer described it as "poor value for money" as it differed little from the pen-and-paper version of the game. A review in the 1983 Book of Atari Software described it as a "nice implementation of the classic game", but also criticised the graphics, and gave the game a rating of "B" overall.

In a retrospective review in Classic Home Video Games, 1972-1984: A Complete Reference Guide, Brett Weiss described it as "a passable rendition of a classic game".

== See also ==
- List of Atari 2600 games
