= David Crane (programmer) =

American video game designer and programmer (born 1954)

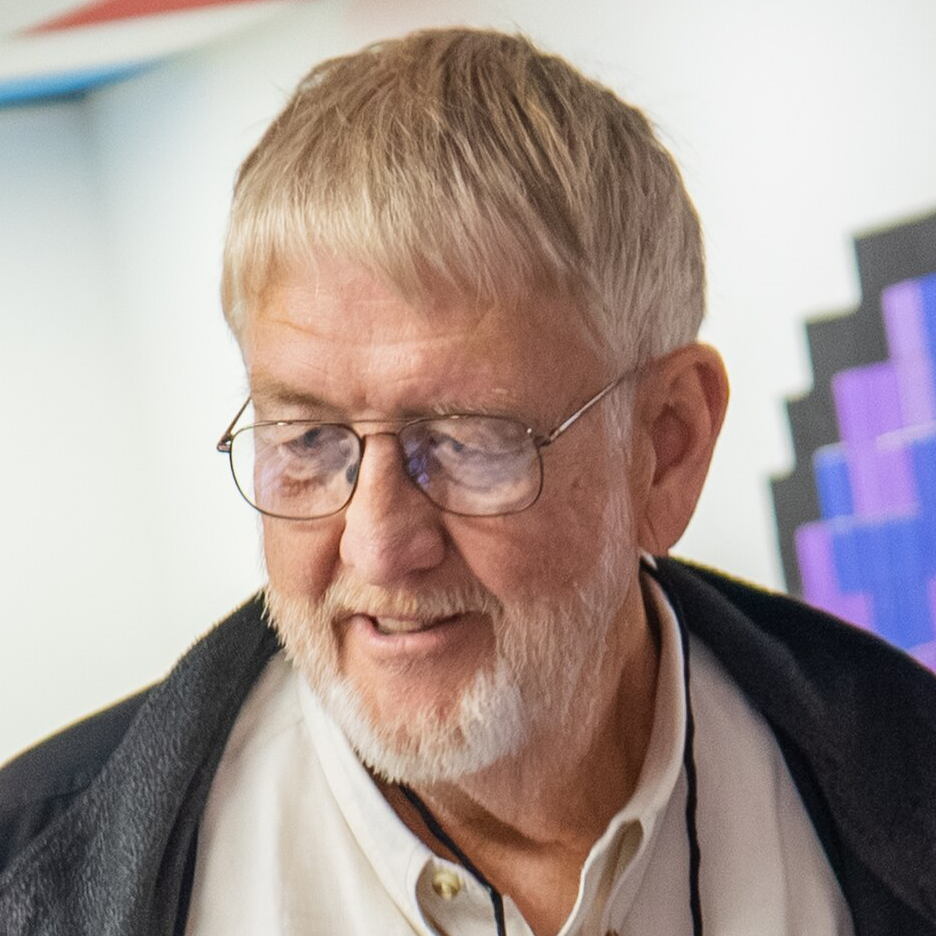
- David Crane at the first edition of VCF LATAM 2026
- Born: 1954 (age 71–72); Nappanee, Indiana, U.S.
- Education: DeVry University
- Occupations: Video game designer and programmer
- Employers: Atari, Inc.; Activision
- Known for: Co-founder of Skyworks Interactive and Audacity Games
- Notable work: Pitfall!; Ghostbusters; Little Computer People; A Boy and His Blob

David Crane (born 1954) is an American video game designer and programmer. He is the co-founder of Activision, which he formed with former Atari co-workers in 1979.

Crane grew up fascinated by technology and went to DeVry Institute of Technology. Following college, he went to Silicon Valley and got his first job at National Semiconductor. Through his friend Alan Miller he learned about potential video game design work at Atari, Inc., and began work there in 1977.

After Crane and other programmers felt they were not being paid fairly at Atari, he left the company in 1979. Crane and Miller formed Activision, the first company to independently publish games for the Atari 2600. The company grew to be massively successful, with Crane's game Pitfall! (1982) being one of the biggest sellers for the company. Crane continued to work for Activision making several games for the Atari 2600 and later the Commodore 64. After Activision hired Bruce Davis as the new CEO, Crane left Activision and later joined Garry Kitchen at Absolute Entertainment. At Absolute, Crane began working on several games for the Atari 2600, Nintendo Entertainment System and Super Nintendo Entertainment System.

After Absolute closed in 1995, Crane formed Skyworks Technologies, who made browser games in the mid-1990s and was among the first developers of a type of game later known as advergames. While at Skyworks, Crane designed two of the company's bestsellers on the App Store, Arcade Bowling and Arcade Hoops Basketball. In the 2010s, Crane developed games for AppStar for iPhone and iPad and by the end of the decade created Audacity Games, a company that developed games for older consoles such as the Atari 2600.

== Biography ==
=== Early life ===
David Crane was born in Nappanee, Indiana in 1954. When he was young, Crane was fascinated by technology and engineering. He dismantled a black and white television to create a channel tuner near his bedside and make a TV in a cabinet on his wall and create a laser that could ignite a match at the end of a workbench. He intended to work on making gadgets that would help people in their lives but, in 2010, he reflected that "...video game design was even a better fit for that combination of skills. But as I was growing up there was no such thing as a videogame, so how could I know?" Crane's first encounter with a video game was with the Magnavox Odyssey that his parents bought him. He later admitted he was "bored by the rudimentary games" but was fascinated by the technology's potential.

Crane first encountered a computer through a Boy Scout master who worked in data processing and began learning Hollerith code for punched cards. He attended a computer programming extension campus. Once Crane graduated in 1972, he could code in three different programming languages. Crane went to the DeVry Institute of Technology in Phoenix, Arizona. He completed the four-year course in 33 months and received his degree in electrical engineering.

=== National Semiconductor and Atari ===
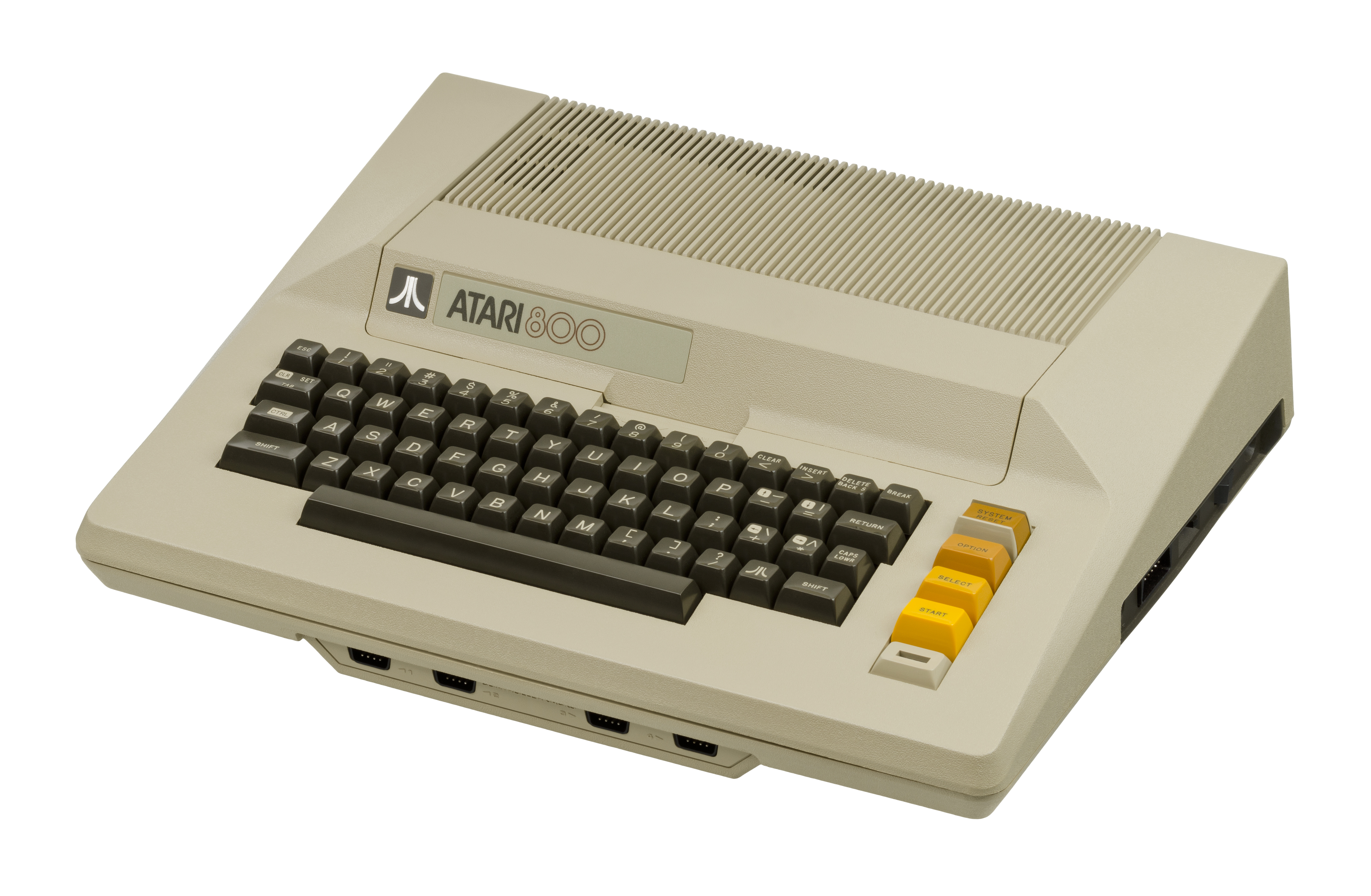
Crane assisted with building the operating system for the Atari 8-bit computers (Atari 800 pictured).

Following college, he moved to Silicon Valley and got his first job at National Semiconductor in 1975. At the company, he worked on linear integrated circuits in order to become proficient in electronic design.

While playing tennis with Alan Miller, he was told by his friend that Atari was looking for game programmers. After proofreading a newspaper ad his friend had made for the position, Crane wrote a resume, was interviewed the next day at 10 am and had the job by 2 pm. Crane joined Atari in the third quarter of 1977 and first began producing Arcade-inspired titles such as Outlaw and Canyon Bomber for the Atari VCS (later known as the Atari 2600). Crane was initially unsure about programming games, but found he enjoyed microprocessor programming and game design. Atari began their new line of computers with the Atari 800 and required help with software development. This led to Atari having all of its game designers, including Crane, step in to work on the machine's operating system.

In 1979, Crane and other game developers at Atari, including Miller, Larry Kaplan, and Bob Whitehead received a memo indicating that their games were the most financially successful for Atari, making up $60 million of Atari's $100 million game cartridge sales in 1978. As they were making a salary of $30,000, they asked for a raise and, according to Crane, were told by Ray Kassar that Crane was "no more important to the success of those products than the person on the assembly line who puts them together."

=== Activision ===
Crane and Miller left Atari in August 1979. They had a plan to create an independent development and publishing company to produce games for Atari's VCS console, which had not been attempted previously. Crane was suggested by a lawyer to Jim Levy in 1979. Levy had been working for GRT Records and was raising money to go into business making cassette tape software and believed abilities in marketing and the business skills to help create their new company Activision.

Initially working out of Crane's apartment, Miller and Crane began programming a development system for Activision. Whitehead and Kaplan joined shortly after. Activision had a five-year business plan, to initially make video games during the slow growth of the home computer and switch over to computers in the future. Activision's first games came out in 1980, including Crane's Dragster and Fishing Derby. The following year saw the release of Crane's Freeway while Crane also contributed to other developers' games, such as the graphics code in Kaplan's Kaboom!. In 1982, Activision released Crane's game Pitfall! which was one of the company's biggest sellers.

Activision went public in 1983. Crane spoke positively about working at the company in the early 1980s, saying that due to their rapid success "everyone wanted to work [at Activision]. [...] When Activision reached sales of $60 million, we had 60 employees. People have to work pretty hard for a company to have revenues of $1 million per employee." Crane followed Pitfall! with two games: The Activision Decathlon (1983), which was developed with the impetus that the Olympics would be returning to the United States in 1984, and a sequel titled Pitfall II: Lost Caverns (1984). Crane stated he made the sequel to Pitfall! "at a time when the Atari 2600 should have been replaced by a new gaming system." and designed a custom computer chip called the Display Processor Chip that was unique to Pitfall II: Lost Caverns.

Following the video game crash of 1983 and the release of Pitfall II, Crane began focusing to transition into developing computer games at Activision. Crane felt the Commodore 64 (C64) had sold well enough to be a good platform to design games for. Crane reflected on adapting to programming for the C64 as a "mixed blessing", specifically finding that the tools he had been using were now obsolete and that they needed to create new development systems, compressors and decompressors, audio and sound effect drivers. He summarized it as "imagine, in whatever your job might be, that every two years or so, everything changes." The first game he made, Ghostbusters (1984) which was finished in six weeks using work Crane had been developing for a game called Car Wars. The game went on to become the Activision title that was received the most ports across consoles and home computers. His next game, Little Computer People (1985) was a critical success while failing commercially. Crane later said that "there was so much programming in [Little Computer People] that it cost more to produce than it made at retail. We had dozens of ideas for follow-up products, but if those ideas were going to lose money the company couldn't afford to produce them. I regret that we were unable to follow those ideas to see what might have become of the first large-scale simulated life form on a computer." In 1985, Activision began the process of acquiring game company Infocom. As the deal was signed, Activision's board of directors replaced Levy and brought in Bruce Davis as the new CEO. Crane left Activision in 1987, later explaining that Activision's management "had no creative vision at all, I left when I could no longer affect the future of the company." He also noted a pay issue, saying that "the new president, Bruce Davis, asked me to take a fraction of my salary, with the rest made up through an incentive bonus. I asked him to put the bonus in clear terms in writing and he couldn't [...] He just slashed my salary without a compensating bonus. So I left."

=== Absolute Entertainment ===
Following Activision, Crane worked independently, including finishing research work on a video game system for Hasbro. By January 1989, Crane became the Senior Designer at the publishing company Absolute Entertainment, a company formed by former Activision staff member Garry Kitchen. Kitchen contacted the Japanese company Nintendo for the rights to develop games for their Nintendo Entertainment System (NES) console, which led to him being continuously rejected by the company. This led to Crane creating a development system for the NES, making them be the first company in North America to be licensed to program games for the NES.

At Absolute, Crane worked on titles for the Atari 2600, the NES, and the Super Nintendo Entertainment System. Among these games at were Super Skateboardin', several games based on The Simpsons license, and two of his own creations: A Boy and his Blob (1989) and David Crane's Amazing Tennis (1992).

Crane recalled in a 2005 interview with Frank Cifaldi that the team "had a lot of fun on the development side, but under the rule of Nintendo, the publishing side of the game business was really tough." Crane said that to make any profit, the publisher had to predict how many games would sell in the market, saying that "If their estimate was off by 10% either way they were likely to lose money on the game." Absolute closed in 1995. Crane recalled that "It was painful to close down Absolute, but the same was happening to small publishers all around the world."

=== Skyworks Technologies ===
Following the demise of Absolute, Kitchen and Crane went into business making games that did not require inventory and began developing games for web browsers. Believing that audiences would be too afraid to give out information such as credit cards online, they developed a business model that later became known as advergaming which involved allowing their games to be played for free but licensing them to other companies' websites.

Among the games they developed built and launched Candystand for The Lifesavers Company. Crane and Skyworks took a percentage of their promotions budget and built a place to play games. Crane and company also developed a site similar to Candystand for ESPN. Crane called this "moderately successful arrangement, only limited by the learning curve of their salespeople who could never quite understand the difference between sponsorship and advertising." While at Skyworks, Crane designed two of the company's biggest App store sellers with Arcade Bowling and Arcade Hoops Basketball.

=== 2010s and Audacity Games ===
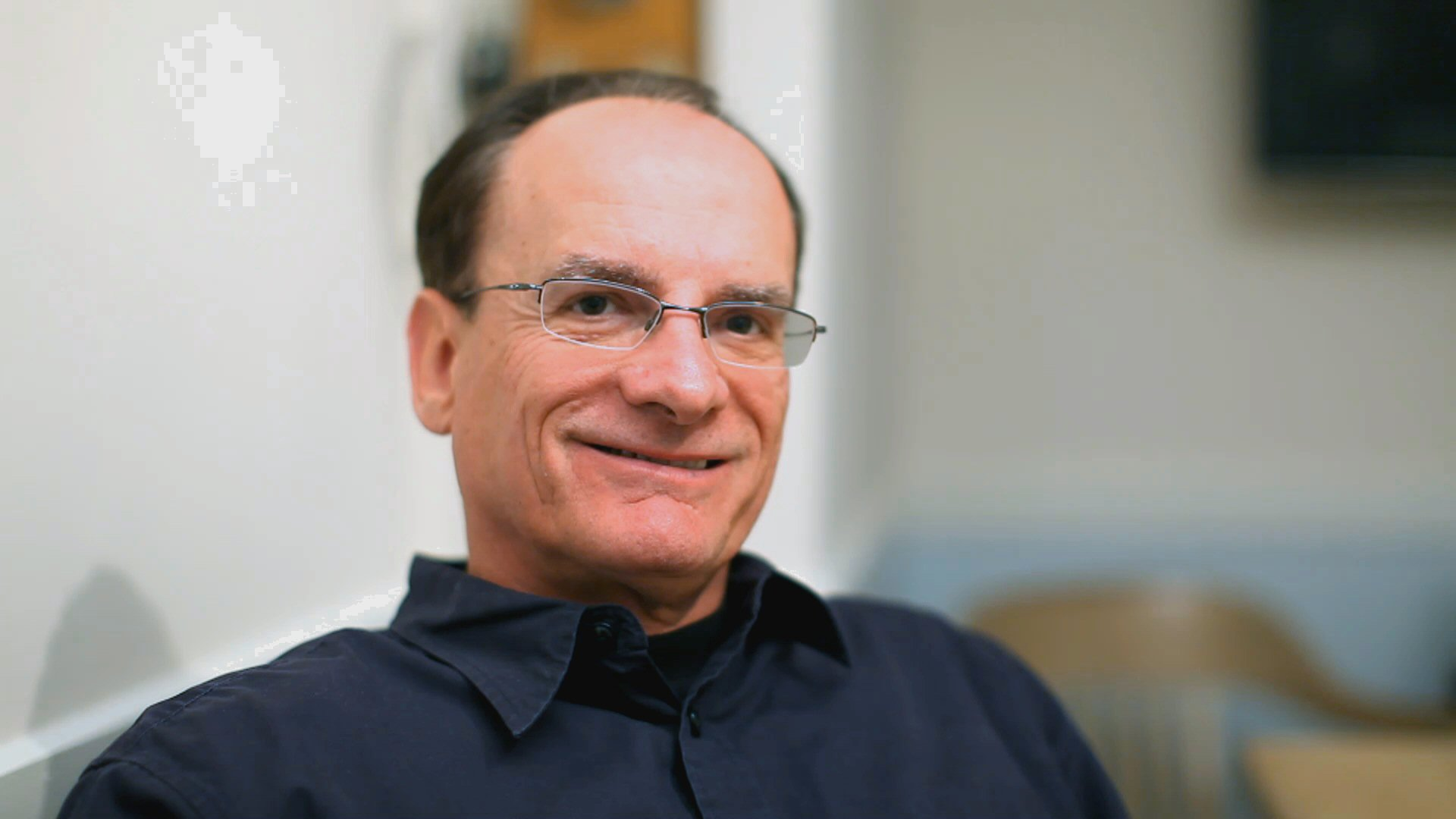
Garry Kitchen in 2013. Crane worked with Kitchen at several companies including Absolute Entertainment, AppStar, and Audacity Games.

In 2010, Crane and Kitchen began work at AppStar. Kitchen served as president and CEO while Crane was the company's chief technical officer. They published their first game, Iron Horse in 2010. Crane began reflecting on his career in 2010 and started writing and gathering material about working on Atari 2600 games. He considered publishing them to magazines or as a book, but opted to release them through AppStar Games on the iPhone, initially writing a work on Dragster but starting with a 2600 primer titled 2600 Magic as an app. Crane later created a crowdfunding campaign Kickstarter in 2012 to fund a spiritual successor to Pitfall!, which fell far short of his funding goal.

In the late 2010s, Crane and Kitchen created a company focused on hardware technology that made cartridges and ROM boards for development of Atari 2600 games. Early in 2021, Crane, Garry Kitchen and his brother Dan Kitchen launched Audacity Games, a company dedicated to making new games for old consoles. Their first title, Circus Convoy, was released in 2021 for the Atari 2600. Crane's next Atari 2600 game for Audacity Games was Escape From Poseidon's Gate which released on October 22, 2025.

== Legacy ==
In January 1983, The Video Game Update awarded David Crane as the Designer of the Year for Pitfall! in their Awards of Excellence for 1982. Pitfall! remained the game that Crane has been most associated with. In 2012, he stated that "I suppose that's not a bad problem to have, It's not a dark shadow. But I'm not just a classic gaming guy. This is what I do for a living!"

In February 2010, Crane became the first recipient of the Academy of Interactive Arts & Sciences Pioneer award. The award is reserved for people whose work has shaped and defined the interactive entertainment industry.

IGN listed David Crane on their list of the top 100 game creators of all time at number 12.

== Personal life ==
Outside engineering and video game development, Crane was an avid tennis player. Crane had played tournament tennis for decades, as well as playing in doubles with Alan Miller. While working at Absolute, Crane felt his video game career did not allow him to play enough tennis and enrolled at an expert tennis class at Cañada College. Crane said that during his adult life, he performed at the rating of 5.0 on the NTRP (National Tennis Rating Program) scale, a standardized scale Crane described as being from 1.0 for beginner to "7.0 for Roger Federer". In 2010, Crane said he still plays tennis in tournament league competitions, but due to age and injuries he is no longer at the 5.0 level.

Despite his love for the sport, Crane stated he never had interest in developing a tennis-themed game until he began developing games for the Super Nintendo, specifically with David Crane's Amazing Tennis.

== Select works ==
Year	Game title	Role
1978	Outlaw	Lead designer
1979	Canyon Bomber	Developer
1979	Slot Machine	Developer
1980	Dragster	Conceiver, designer
1980	Fishing Derby	Conceiver, designer
1981	Laser Blast	Conceiver, designer
1981	Freeway	Conceiver, designer
1981	Kaboom!	Graphics code
1982	Grand Prix	Conceiver, designer
1982	Pitfall!	Designer
1983	The Activision Decathlon	Designer
1984	Pitfall II: Lost Caverns	Designer
1984	Ghostbusters	Developer
1985	Little Computer People	Programming
1986	Transformers: The Battle to Save the Earth	Designer
1989	A Boy and His Blob: Trouble on Blobolonia	Designer
1990	The Rescue of Princess Blobette	Designer and program
1991	The Simpsons: Bart vs. the Space Mutants	Additional programming
1991	The Simpsons: Bart vs. the World	Additional programming and design
1991	Bart Simpson's Escape from Camp Deadly	Program and design
1992	David Crane's Amazing Tennis	Designer, programming
1992	Night Trap	Programming
2021	Circus Convoy	Conceiver, designer
2025	Rescue From Poseidon's Gate	Conceiver, designer
