= Ice Hockey (1981 video game) =

1981 video game

- Developer: Activision
- Publisher: Activision
- Designer: Alan Miller
- Platform: Atari 2600
- Release: NA: December 1981
- Genre: Sports (ice hockey)
- Modes: Single-player, multiplayer

Ice Hockey is an ice hockey video game designed by Alan Miller for the Atari VCS (later renamed the Atari 2600), and published by Activision in 1981. Actor and comedian Phil Hartman starred in the commercial for the game.

== Gameplay ==
Gameplay screenshot

Ice Hockey is a game of two-on-two ice hockey. One player on each team is the goalie, and the other plays offensive (although, the goalie is not confined to the goal). As in the real sport, the object of the game is to take control of the puck and shoot it into the other goal to score points. When the puck is in the players control, it moves left and right along the blade of the hockey stick. The puck can be shot in any of 32 angles, depending on the position of the puck when it's hit.

Human players take control of the skater who is in possession of (or closest to) the puck. The puck can be stolen from its holder and shots can also be blocked by the blade of the hockey stick.

== Development ==
Prior to developing Ice Hockey, Alan Miller worked at Atari where he made his first game for the company with Surround (1977). When he left Atari, he was one of the founding members of Activision where he developed the games Checkers and Tennis.

Miller decided to create a hockey game at Activision after watching the sport on television. Miller later said "I definitely wanted to put the opportunity to knock your opponent down, Ice Hockey was an improved version of Tennis. I'm actually more proud of it than Tennis."

To create the game, Miller adapted the missile object, which in most games was a bullet, into the player hockey stick in the programming. Other difficult coding tricks involved having different players have alternate clothing depending on what team they were on as well as getting four players on the screen than the usual two.

== Release and reception ==
Ice Hockey was released for the Atari VCS in December 1981. It was favorably reviewed in 1982 by Video magazine where it was described as "yet another example of Activision's innovative approach to programmable video-game software" and suggested along with Championship Soccer the game "proves that cleverly conceived sports simulations can work on the Atari VCS". Reviewers identified several aspects setting Ice Hockey apart from other contemporary sports games including the ability of players to take actions which would normally result in penalties (e.g. tripping and slashing), and the fact that the game is playable in both solo and versus modes.

Richard A. Edwards reviewed Ice Hockey in The Space Gamer No. 54. Edwards commented "It's a good game overall, but not a great treatment of ice hockey. Due to the frustrations which can occur and the confusion involved in using two team members, this game straddles the fence on deciding about recommendation. Due to the price, it might be better left alone."

When Bill Kunkel reviewed the Atari 8-bit computer game Hockey by Gamma Software, he wrote, "Gamma's version misses the level of realism attained in Activision's programmable version for the VCS, by quite a bit."

== See also ==
- List of Atari 2600 games
- List of Activision games: 1980–1999
