= Basketball (1978 video game) =

1978 video game

- Box art by Cliff Spohn
- Developer: Atari, Inc.
- Publishers: Atari, Inc.
- Programmer: Alan Miller
- Platforms: Atari 2600, Atari 8-bit
- Release: 2600: October 1978; Atari 8-bit: 1979
- Genre: Sports (basketball)
- Modes: Single-player, multiplayer

Basketball is a 1978 basketball video game programmed by Alan Miller and published by Atari, Inc. for the Atari Video Computer System (later renamed the Atari 2600). The cartridge presents a game of one-on-one basketball and can be played by one or two players, one of the few early VCS titles to have a single-player mode with an AI-controlled opponent. Miller wrote a version of Basketball for Atari 8-bit computers with improved graphics, published in 1979. That same year, an arcade version similar to the computer port was released by Atari, but in black and white.

== Gameplay ==
The purple player is dribbling a square, blue ball (Atari VCS).

At the start of the game, both players are in the center of the court. A jump ball is thrown between them to begin play. The player in the offensive position (in possession of the ball) always faces a basket representing the assigned shooting target, and the defensive player always faces the opponent. Each player can move in eight directions with the joystick; the player who has the ball constantly dribbles it. The defensive player may steal the ball when it leaves the opponent's hands (either in mid-dribble or mid-shot).

After either player scores, the shooter is reset to the center of the court and becomes the defensive player while the former defender is positioned under the basket to inbound the ball. The player with the higher score after four minutes is the winner.

The game has two difficulty levels selected with the Difficulty Switch. In "B" position, the player can move from goal to goal much more quickly than the "A" position.

== Reception ==
In Video magazine's "Arcade Alley" review column, reviewers described it as "that rare game that plays well solitaire or with a human opponent," and noted "the game definitely captures the flavor of basketball." The "fan's eye perspective" was singled out for particular praise, and the game as a whole was found to "offer the most exciting four minutes of one-on-one hoop action [the reviewers had] seen so far."

== Legacy ==
In the 1980 comedy film Airplane!, flight controllers are seen playing Atari VCS Basketball rather than watching the monitor.
