= Activision =

American video game publisher

Activision Publishing, Inc.
- Logo used since 1979

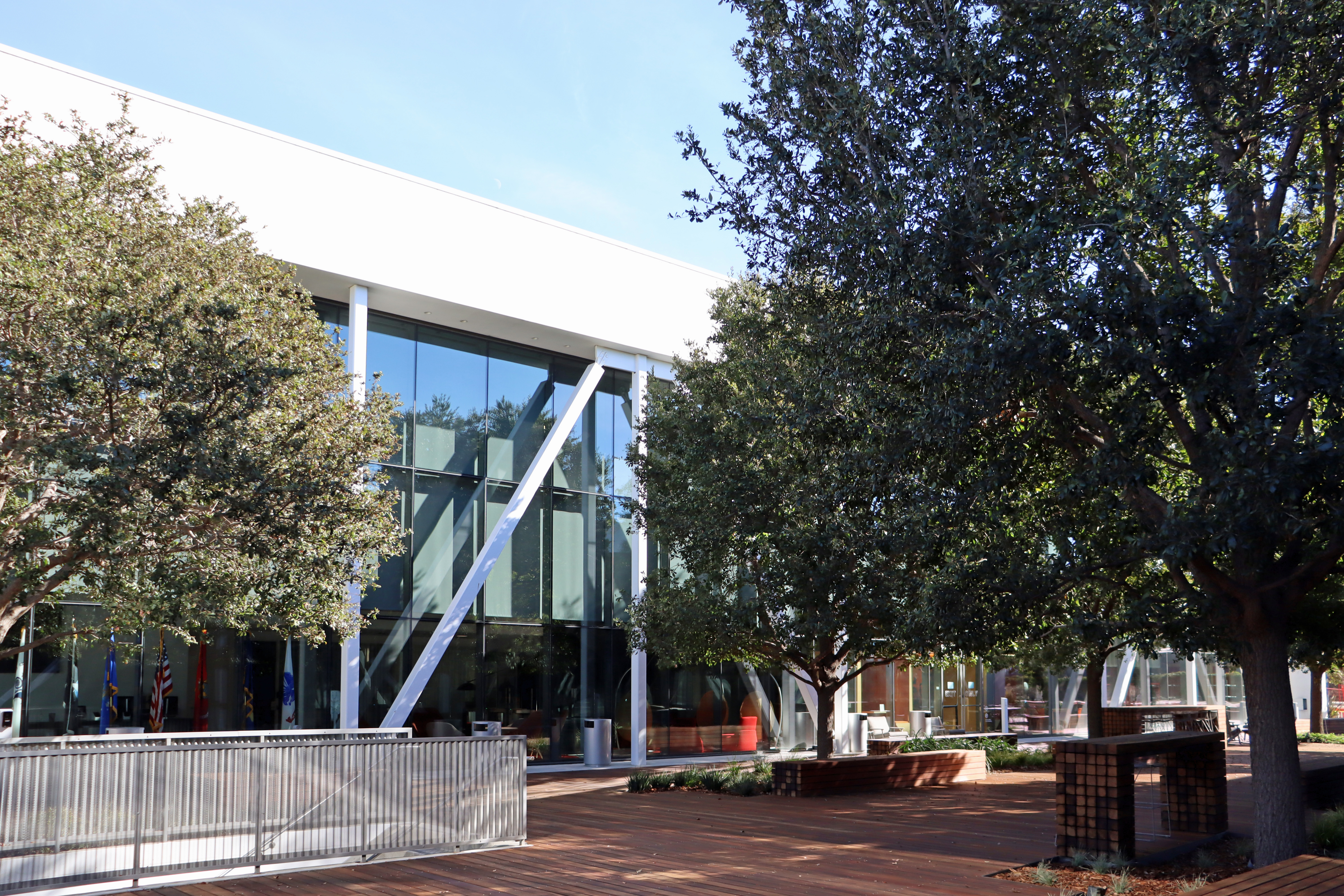
- Current headquarters in Santa Monica in 2025 (shared with parent company Activision Blizzard)
- Formerly: Computer Arts, Inc.; (1979); Activision, Inc.; (1979–1988; 1992–2000); Mediagenic; (1988–1992)
- Type: Subsidiary
- Industry: Video games
- Founded: October 1, 1979; 47 years ago
- Founders: David Crane; Alan Miller; Bob Whitehead; Jim Levy
- Headquarters: 2701 Olympic Blvd, Santa Monica, California, US
- Area served: Worldwide
- Key people: Rob Kostich (president)
- Products: List of Activision video games
- Parent: Activision, Inc.; (2000–2008); Activision Blizzard; (2008–present)
- Subsidiaries: See § Studios
- Website: activision.com

Activision Publishing, Inc. is an American video game publisher based in Santa Monica, California. It is the publishing business for its parent company, Activision Blizzard, and consists of several subsidiary studios. Activision is one of the largest third-party video game publishers in the world and was the top United States publisher in 2016.

The company was founded as Activision, Inc. on October 1, 1979, in Sunnyvale, California, by former Atari, Inc. programmers for the popular Atari Video Computer System (later renamed to Atari 2600) home video game console. Upset at their treatment by Atari, they left to develop games for the same system, notably including Pitfall!. Activision was the first independent, third-party, console video game developer. The video game crash of 1983, in part created by too many new companies trying to follow in Activision's footsteps without the experience of Activision's founders, hurt Activision's position in console games and forced the company to diversify into games for home computers, including the acquisition of Infocom. After a management shift, with CEO Jim Levy replaced by Bruce Davis, the company renamed itself to Mediagenic and branched out into business software applications. Mediagenic quickly fell into debt, and the company was bought for around US$500,000 by Bobby Kotick and a small group of investors around 1991.

Kotick drastically revamped and restructured the company to get it out of debt: dismissing most of its staff, moving the company to Los Angeles, and reverting to the Activision name. Building on existing assets, the Kotick-led Activision pursued more publishing opportunities and, after recovering from its former financial troubles, started acquiring numerous studios and various types of intellectual property over the 1990s and 2000s, among these being the Call of Duty and Guitar Hero series. A holding company was formed as Activision's parent company to manage both its internal and acquired studios. In 2008, this holding company merged with Vivendi Games (the parent company of Blizzard Entertainment) and formed Activision Blizzard, with Kotick as its CEO. Within this structure, Activision manages numerous third-party studios and publishes all games besides those created by Blizzard. In October 2023, Microsoft acquired parent company Activision Blizzard, maintaining that the company would continue to operate as a separate business. While part of the larger Xbox division (formerly Microsoft Gaming), Activision retains its function as the publisher of games developed by its studios.

== History ==
=== Founding (1979) ===
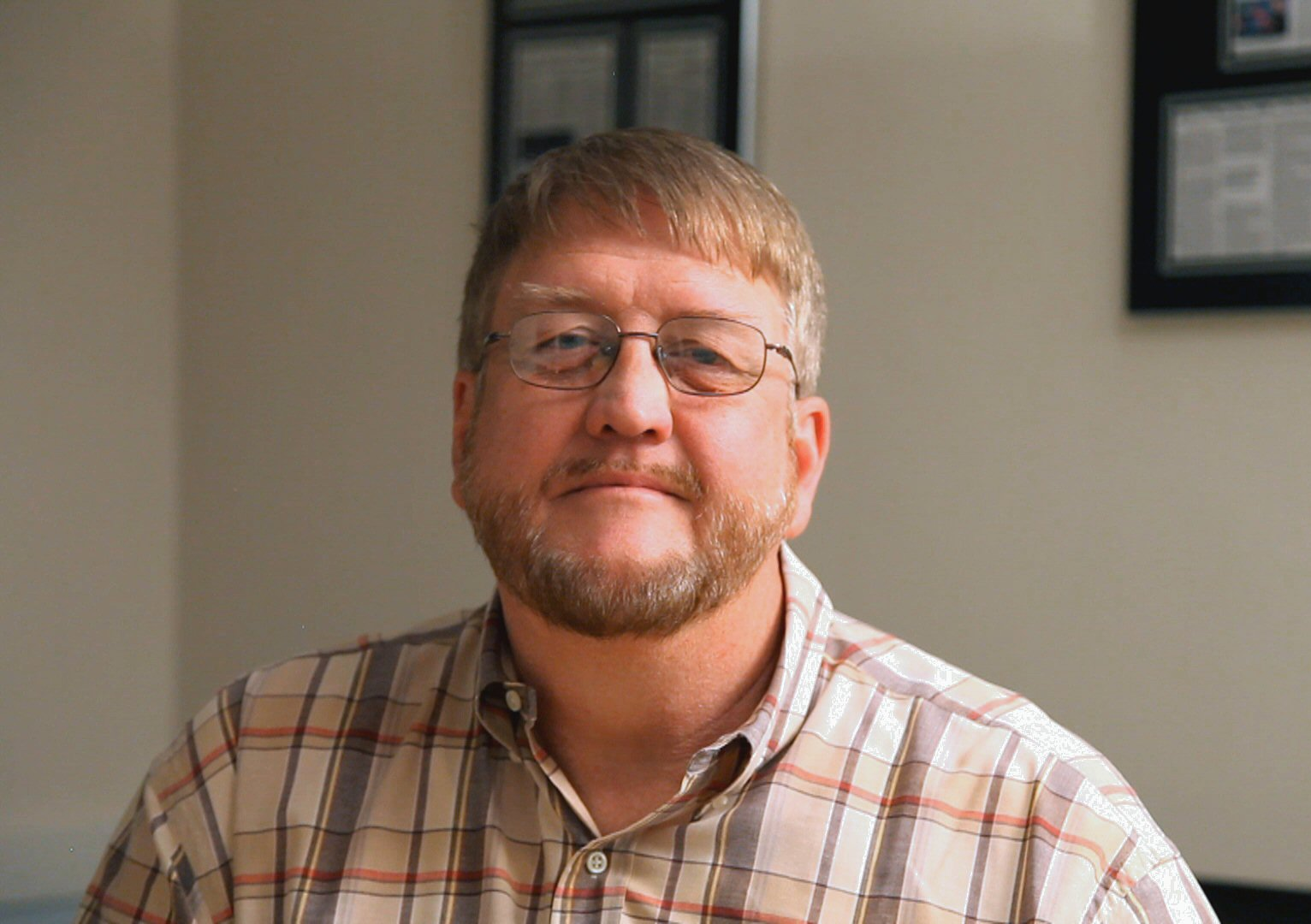
Co-founder David Crane in 2013

In 1976, Warner Communications bought Atari, Inc. from Nolan Bushnell to help accelerate the Atari Video Computer System (Atari VCS or later the Atari 2600) to market by 1977. That same year, Atari began hiring programmers to create games for the system. Prior to Warner's acquisition, the company did not award bonus pay to programmers who worked on profitable games, nor credit the programmers publicly, to prevent them from being poached by rival game companies. Warner Communications' management style was also different from Bushnell's. According to developer John Dunn, Warner management treated developers as engineers rather than creative staff, creating conflicts with staff. Atari's CEO Ray Kassar, named to that position following Warner's acquisition in 1978, was committed to keeping production costs minimal for Warner.

In early 1979, Atari's marketing department circulated a memo listing the best-selling cartridges from the previous year to help guide game ideas. David Crane noted that the games he was fully responsible for had brought in over $20 million for the company but he was still only receiving a $20,000 salary. Out of a development staff of thirty-five, four programmers (Crane, Larry Kaplan, Alan Miller and Bob Whitehead), had produced games that had accounted for 60% of Atari's sales.

Crane, Kaplan, Miller, and Whitehead became vocal about the lack of recognition within the company and became known as the "Gang of Four". The group met with Kassar in May 1979 to demand that the company treat developers as record labels treated musicians, with royalties and their names on game boxes. Kaplan, who called the others "the best designers for the [2600] in the world", recalled that Kassar (whose pre-Atari job was at a textile company) called the four men "towel designers" and claimed that "anybody can do a cartridge".

The four made the decision to soon leave Atari and start their own business, but were not sure how to go about it. In 1979, the concept of third-party developers did not exist, as software for video game consoles were published exclusively by makers of the systems for which the games were designed; thus the common thinking was that to make console games, one needed to make a console first. The four decided to create their own independent game development company. They were directed by their attorney to Jim Levy, who was at the time raising venture capital to get into the software business for early home computers. Levy listened to their plans, agreed with its direction, and helped the four to secure about $1 million in capital from Sutter Hill Ventures. They also checked with legal counsel on their plans to develop games for the Atari VCS, and included litigation fees in their capital investment.

By August, Crane and Miller had left Atari, with Whitehead joining them shortly after. Kaplan had also quit Atari in August, but initially decided not to join as he did not like the starting business plan; he came back later to join Activision that December. Activision was formally founded on October 1, 1979, with Levy as CEO. The company was initially named "Computer Arts, Inc." while they considered a better title. The founders had thought of the name VSync, Inc., but feared that the public would not understand or know how to say it. Levy suggested combining "active" and "television" to come up with Activision.

=== Early years (1980–1982) ===
Activision began working out of Crane's garage in the latter half of 1979, each programmer developing their own game that was planned for release in mid-1980: Dragster, Fishing Derby, Checkers, and Boxing. The four's knowledge of the Atari 2600, as well as software tricks for the system, helped them make their own games visually distinct from Atari-produced games. To further distinguish themselves, Activision's boxes were brightly colored and featured an in-game screenshot on the back cover. Instruction manuals for games devoted at least one page to credit the developer. Additionally, for nearly all of Activision's games through 1983, the instruction manuals included instructions for sending the company a photograph of a player's high scores to receive a patch in return.

Ahead of the release of the first four games, Activision obtained space at the mid-year 1980 Consumer Electronics Show to showcase its titles, and it quickly obtained favorable press. The attention afforded to Activision worried Atari, as the four's departure had already created a major dent in their development staff. Atari initially tried to tarnish Activision's reputation by using industry press at CES to label those that took trade secrets as "evil, terrible people", according to Crane, and then later threatened to refuse to sell Atari games to retailers that also carried these Activision titles. By the end of 1980, Atari filed a formal lawsuit against Activision to try to stop the company, claiming the four had stolen trade secrets and violated non-disclosure agreements. The lawsuit was settled by 1982, with Activision agreeing to pay royalties to Atari but otherwise legitimizing the third-party development model.

Following the first round of releases, each of the founders developed their own titles, about once a year, over the first few years of the company. While their 1980 games were modest hits, one of the company's first successful games was Kaboom!, released in 1981, which was Activision's first game to sell over a million units. Activision's breakout title was 1982's Pitfall!, created by Crane. More than four million copies of the game were sold. Near the end of 1982, Kaplan left Activision to work on the development of the Amiga personal computer as he wanted to be more involved in hardware development.

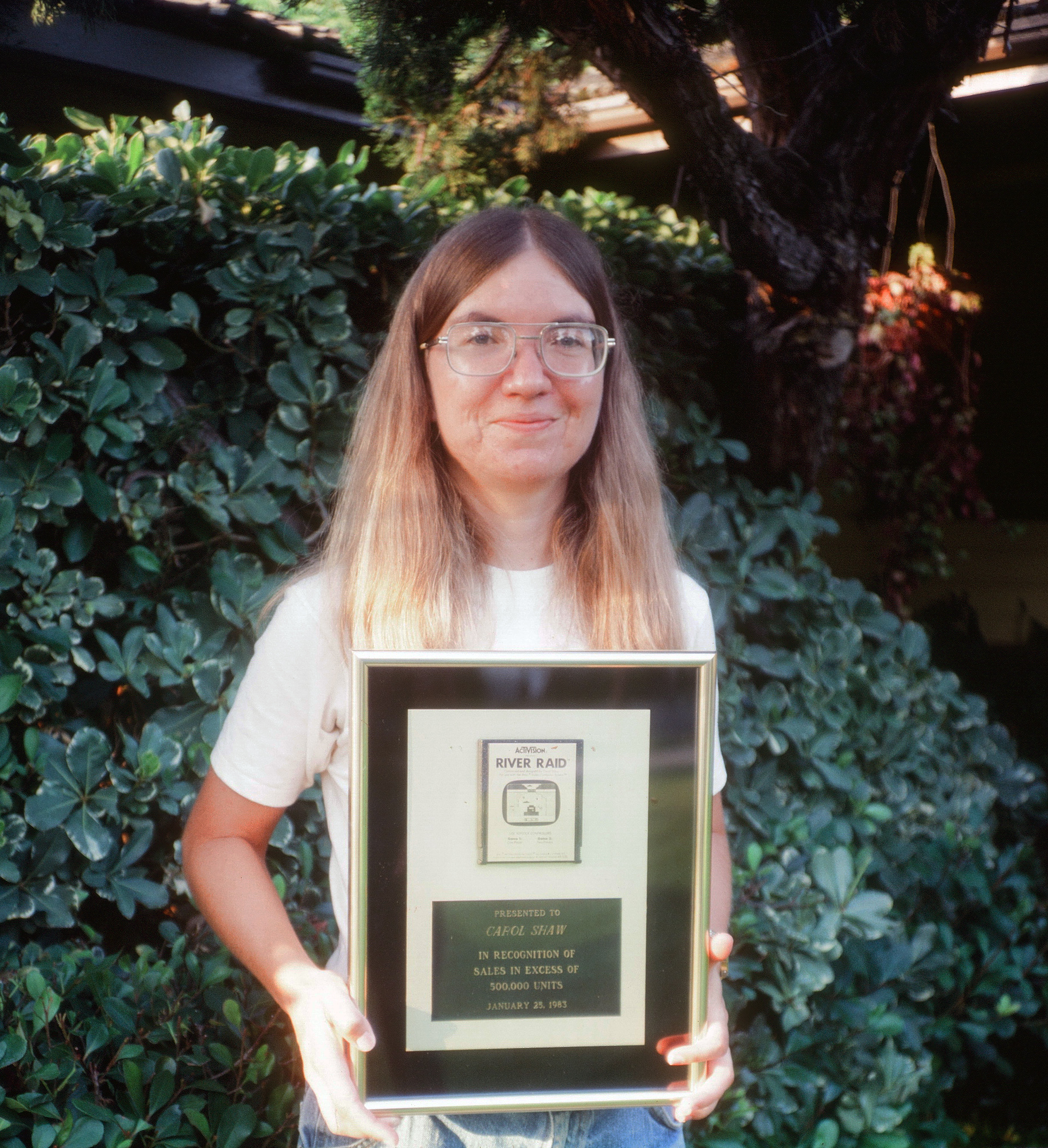
Carol Shaw, designer of River Raid, with a 1983 plaque marking 500,000 copies sold

Total sales for Activision were estimated at $157 million and revenues at $60 million ahead of its June 1983 initial public offering; at this point Activision had around 60 employees. Danny Goodman stated in Creative Computing Video & Arcade Games in 1983, "I doubt that there is an active [Atari 2600] owner who doesn't have at least one Activision cartridge in his library". The company completed its public offering in June 1983 on NASDAQ under the stock ticker AVSN.

=== The video game market crash (1983–1988) ===
The success of Activision, alongside the popularity of the Atari 2600, led to many more home consoles third-party developers as well as other home consoles. Activision produced some of its Atari games for the Intellivision and ColecoVision consoles, among other platforms. However, several new third-party developers also arose, attempting to follow the approach Activision had used but without the experience they had; according to Crane, several of these companies were founded with venture capital and hired programmers off the street who had little game design experience, mass-publishing whatever product the developers had made. This was a contributing factor to the video game crash of 1983.

For Activision, while they survived the crash, they felt its effects in the following years. These third-party developers folded, leaving warehouses full of unsold games, which savvy retailers purchased and sold at a mass discount ($5 compared to Activision's $40 manufacturer's suggested retail price). While there was still a demand for Activision games, uneducated consumers were more drawn to the heavily discounted titles instead, reducing their income. Their quarterly revenue dropped from $50 million in mid-1983 to about $6–7 million by the end of 1984, according to Levy, and they were forced to lay off staff, going from about 400 employees to 95 in that period. Because of this, Activision decided that it needed to diversify its games onto home computers such as the Commodore 64, Apple, and Atari 8-bit computers to avoid completely going out of business like other third-party developers. There still was a drain of talent through 1985 from the crash. Miller and Whitehead left in 1984 due to the large devaluation of their stock and went on to form Accolade.

With the video game crash making console game development a risky proposition, the company focused on developing for home computers with games such as Little Computer People and Hacker, while Levy tried to keep expenditures in check as they recovered. Looking to expand further, Activision acquired, through a corporate merger, the struggling text adventure pioneer Infocom in June 1986. This acquisition was spearheaded by Levy, who was a big fan of Infocom's titles and felt the company was in a similar position as Activision. About six months after the "Infocom Wedding", Activision's board decided to replace Levy with Bruce Davis. Davis was against the purchase of Infocom from the start and was heavy-handed in its management, and even attempted to seek a lawsuit to recover its purchase from Infocom's shareholders. Crane also found Davis difficult to work with and was concerned with how Davis managed the closure of Imagic, one of the third-party development studios formed after Activision's success in 1981. Crane left Activision in 1986 and helped Garry Kitchen found Absolute Entertainment. In late 1986, Activision adopted the Electric Dreams brand, usually used for British software, for titles outside of English for the American market.

=== Mediagenic (1988–1991) ===
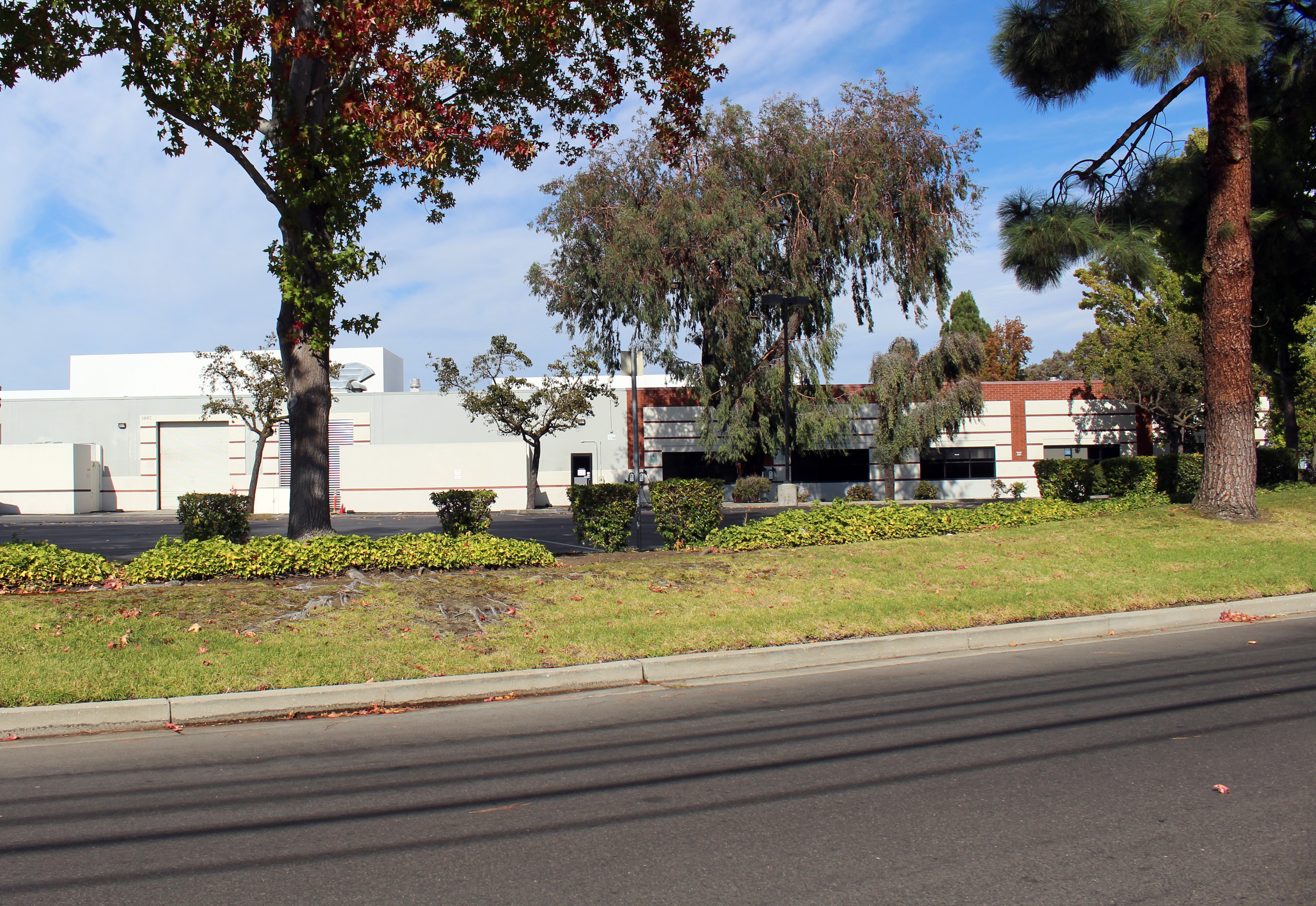
Mediagenic's former headquarters in Menlo Park, c. 2021

In 1988, Activision began involvement in software besides video games, such as business applications. As a result, Activision changed its corporate name to Mediagenic to better represent all of its activities.

Mediagenic consisted of four groups:

- Activision: video game publisher for various platforms, notably the Nintendo Entertainment System, Master System, Atari 7800, Atari ST, Commodore 64, and Amiga
- Infocom: developer of interactive fiction games
- Gamestar: initially an independent company but purchased by Activision in 1986. Specialized in sports video games
- Ten Point O: business application software

In 1989, after several years of losses, Activision closed down the Infocom studios, extending to only 11 of the 26 employees an offer to relocate to Activision's Silicon Valley headquarters. Five of them accepted this offer.

Notably during this time, Mediagenic was known to have worked on the early version of a football game that was the basis for Joe Montana Football. Sega of America's Michael Katz had been able to get Sega to pay Mediagenic around early 1990 to develop this into the branded version after securing the rights to Joe Montana's name, but was unaware of internal troubles that had been going on within the company, which had left the state of the game mostly unfinished. Katz and Sega were forced to take the incomplete game to Electronic Arts, which had been developing its own John Madden Football series for personal computers, to complete the game.

During this period Mediagenic, via Activision, secured the rights to distribute games from Cyan Worlds. The first game published by Activision from Cyan was The Manhole, on CD-ROM for personal computers, the first major game distributed in this format.

=== Purchase by Bobby Kotick (1991–1997) ===
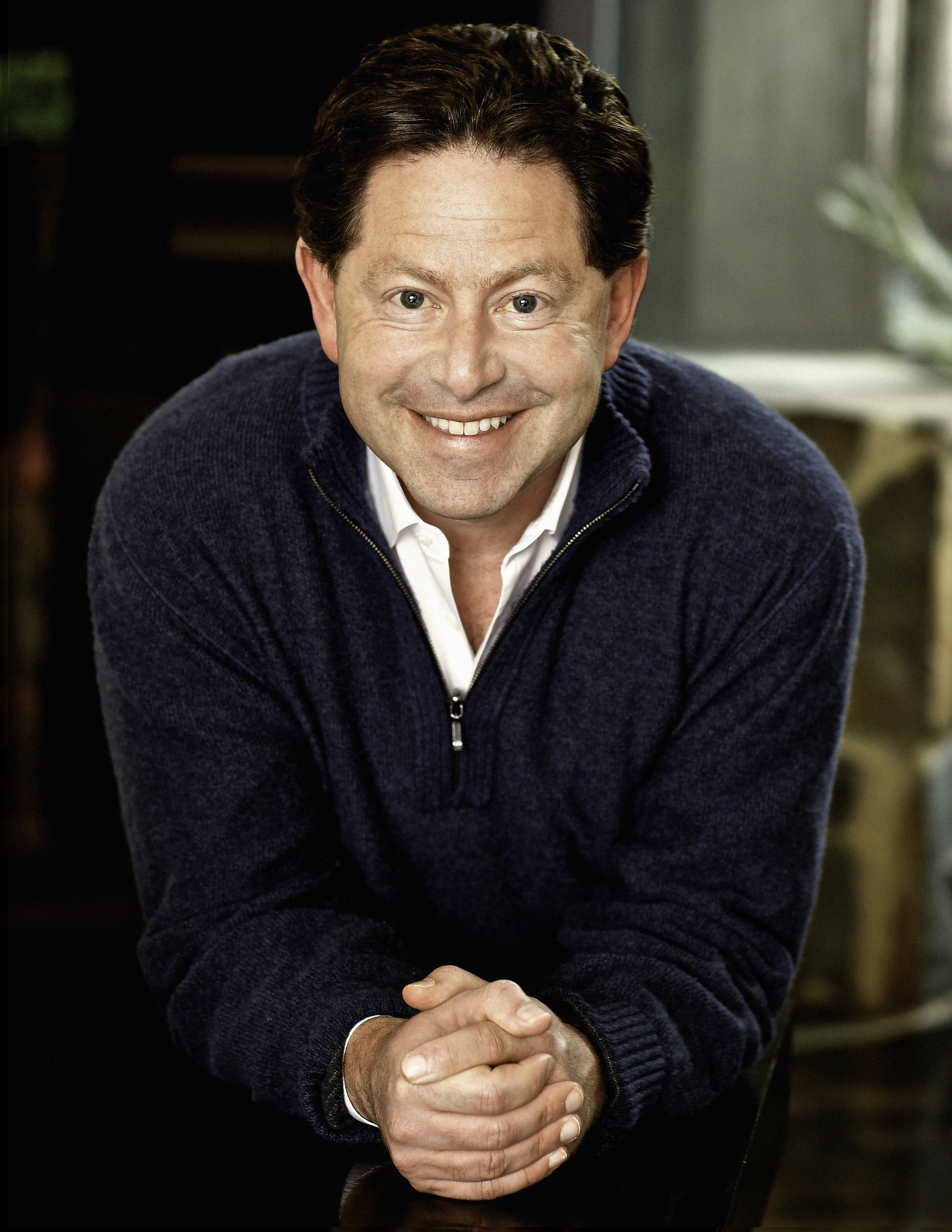
Bobby Kotick

Davis' management of Mediagenic failed to produce a profitable company; in 1991, Mediagenic reported a loss of $26.8 million on only $28.8 million of revenue and had over $60 million in debt. This debt included a $6 million penalty against Mediagenic in May 1990 after losing patent infringement lawsuits filed against it by Magnavox over the similarities of Activision's games to Magnavox's patents. Cyan severed its contract with Activision, and turned to Broderbund for publishing, including what became one of the most significant computer games of the 1990s, Myst.

Bobby Kotick had become interested in the value of the video game industry following the crash, and he and three other investors worked to buy Commodore International in an effort to gain access to the Amiga line of personal computers. After failing to complete purchase, the group bought a company that licensed Nintendo characters, and through Nintendo was directed to the failing Mediagenic. Kotick was drawn to buy out Mediagenic not for its current offerings but for the Activision name, given its past successes with Pitfall!, with hopes to restore Activision to its former glory. After failing to negotiate a purchase with Davis, Kotick and additional investors bought Mediagenic in a hostile takeover for approximately $500,000 in 1991. This group of investors included real estate businessman Steve Wynn and Philips Electronics.

Kotick became CEO of Mediagenic on its purchase and made several immediate changes: He let go of all but 8 of the companies' 150 employees, performed a full restructuring of the company, developed a bankruptcy restructuring plan, and reincorporated the company in Los Angeles, California. In the bankruptcy plan, Kotick recognized that Mediagenic still had valuable assets, which included the Infocom library as well as its authoring tools to make games, Activision's distribution network, and licenses to develop on Nintendo and Sega home consoles. Kotick offset some debt by giving stock in the company to its distributors as to keep them vested in the company's success; this included convincing Philips Electronics, Magnavox's parent company, to convert their legal debt into stock in Activision. Kotick also had the company reissue several of its past console and Infocom titles as compilations for personal computers. Kotick had also recognized the value of the Zork property from Infocom, and had the company develop a sequel, Return to Zork. Combined, these steps allowed Mediagenic to fulfill on the bankruptcy plan, and by the end of 1992, Kotick renamed Mediagenic to the original Activision name. The new Activision went public in October 1993, raising about $40 million, and was listed on NASDAQ under its new ticker symbol ATVI.

By 1995, Kotick's approach had met one promise he made to investors: that he would give them four years of 50% growth in revenues while remaining break-even. Reaching this goal, Kotick then set Activision on his second promise to investors, to develop high-demand games and make the company profitable by 1997.

Activision published the first-person perspective MechWarrior in 1989, based on FASA's pen-and-paper game BattleTech. A sequel, MechWarrior 2, was released in 1995 after two years of delays and internal struggles, prompting FASA not to renew their licensing deal with Activision. To counter, Activision released several more games bearing the MechWarrior 2 name, which did not violate their licensing agreement. These included NetMech, MechWarrior 2: Ghost Bear's Legacy, and MechWarrior 2: Mercenaries. The entire MechWarrior 2 game series accounted for more than US$70 million in sales.

Activision procured the license to another pen-and-paper-based war game, Heavy Gear, in 1997. The video game version was well received by critics, with an 81.46% average rating on GameRankings and being considered the best game of the genre at the time by GameSpot. The Mechwarrior 2 engine was also used in other Activision games, including 1997's Interstate '76 and 1998's Battlezone.

=== Growth and acquisitions (1997–2008) ===
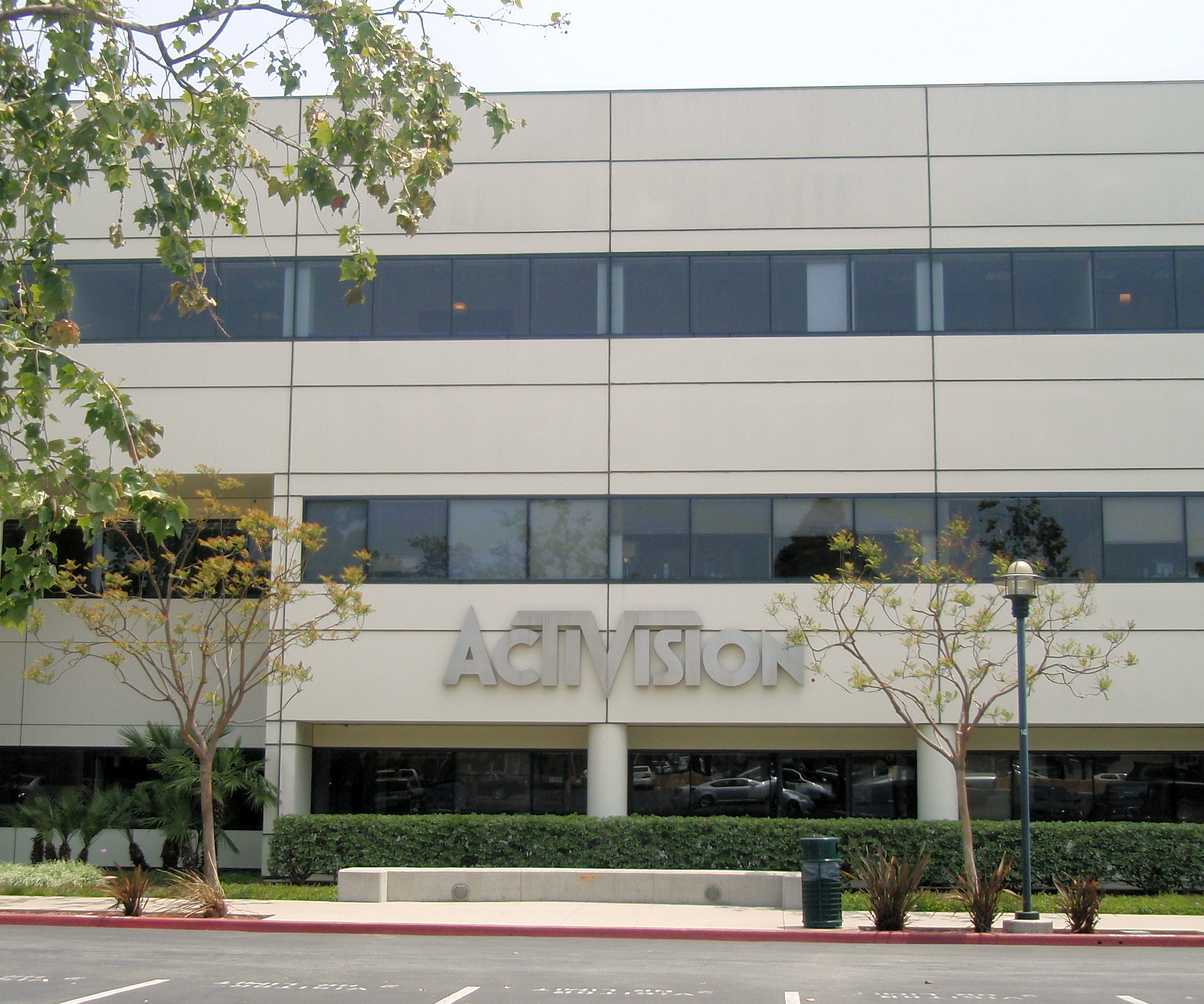
Former Activision headquarters in Santa Monica in 2008

With several of its own successfully developed games helping to turn a profit, Kotick led Activision to start seeking acquisitions of video game development studios, guided by market surveys to determine what areas of content to focus on. It is estimated that between 1997 and 2008, Activision made 25 acquisitions, several for undisclosed amounts. Several of these came prior to 2001, in the midst of the Dot-com bubble, enabling the company to acquire studios at a lower valuation. On June 16, 2000, Activision reorganized as a holding company, Activision Holdings, to manage Activision and its subsidiaries more effectively. Activision changed its corporate name from "Activision, Inc." to "Activision Publishing, Inc.", while Activision Holdings took Activision's former "Activision, Inc." name. Activision Publishing became a wholly owned subsidiary of Activision, which in turn became the publicly traded company, with all outstanding shares of capital stock converted. In April 1998, the company signed a deal with Sony Music Entertainment Japan where Activision handled publishing rights to games from SME Japan. In 1999, Kotick praised Deer Hunter, a series which was previously unsuccessfully pitched to Activision, and the emergence of casual games for a broader audience.

In December 1998, Activision signed a deal with Marvel to publish Spider-Man video games. The deal was then expanded to include games based on characters from X-Men and Blade in October 1999. In January 1999, the company signed a deal with Psygnosis to handle North American distribution of its video game titles. In February 1999, Activision signed a deal with Disney Interactive to publish video games based on Disney movies and franchises for game consoles, including Nintendo 64. In May 1999, the company signed a deal with Fox Interactive to handle distribution of its sports games. In 2000, Activision bought out the Tenchu IP, but it was sold to FromSoftware in 2004. In 2003, Activision signed a deal with DreamWorks Animation to publish video games based on DreamWorks animated films.

Some of the key acquisitions and investments made by Activision in this period include:

- Raven Software: Raven was founded in 1990; because of their close proximity, Raven frequently collaborated with id Software, and one of the studio's early successes was the Heretic series using id's Doom engine. Around 1997, Raven's founders Brian and Steve Raffel felt the need to seek a parent company. They arranged a publishing deal with Activision in 1997, which not only served to provide Raven additional financial support, but also gave Activision the opportunity to work closely with id Software and gain business relationships with them. By the end of 1997, Activision acquired Raven as one of its first subsidiaries under Kotick. The acquisition price was $12 million.
- Neversoft: Prior to its acquisition in 2000, Activision had arranged a development deal with Neversoft to re-develop Apocalypse, a title that failed to be completed within Activision. Subsequently, Activision had Neversoft work on a prototype for a skateboarding game, which became the first in the Tony Hawk's series of skateboarding video games. Tony Hawk's Pro Skater was a critical success, leading Activision to acquire Neversoft in April 2000. After eight games, the series has brought in $1.6 billion.
- Infinity Ward: After Electronic Arts released Medal of Honor: Allied Assault in 2002, several of the developers from 2015, disenchanted with their current contracts, left to form a new studio, Infinity Ward. Kotick himself provided the group with startup funding, as they were seeking to develop a similar title to Medal of Honor. Activision acquired the studio for $5 million in January 2003, and later publish their first title, Call of Duty, directly competing with Electronic Arts. The Call of Duty series has since seen nearly yearly releases and as of 2016 had sold more than 250 million units and brought in more than $12 billion in revenue.
- Treyarch: The Santa Monica, California studio was founded in 1996. With the success of the first Tony Hawk game from Neversoft, Activision used Treyarch to assist in further Tony Hawk games as well as to develop titles using Activision's license of Marvel's Spider-Man. Activision acquired the studio in 2001 for about $20 million. Following the success of Call of Duty from Infinity Ward, Activision moved Treyarch to assist in the series' development, trading off each year' major release between the two studios.
- Gray Matter Studios: While Gray Matter was originally founded in 1993 as Xatrix Entertainment, it was rebranded to Gray Matter in 1999 as it began work on Return to Castle Wolfenstein, in conjunction with Nerve Software and oversight by id Software who owned the Castle Wolfenstein IP. Activision, the game's publisher, acquired a portion of Gray Matter's stock during this time. Return to Castle Wolfenstein was a critical and financial success, and led Activision to acquire the remaining shares of Gray Matter in 2002 for about $3.2 million, with the intent to help Infinity Ward expand out the Call of Duty franchise. In 2005, Activision made the decision to merge the smaller Gray Matter into the larger Treyarch to put their combined talents towards Call of Duty 3.
- RedOctane: Around 2005, Red Octane was co-developing Guitar Hero, a console game based on the arcade game GuitarFreaks, with Harmonix; Harmonix was developing the software while RedOctane developed the instrument controllers. Guitar Hero was a major success. Activision purchased RedOctane for nearly $100 million in June 2006. The series has since earned more than $2 billion in revenues.
- Toys for Bob: Toys for Bob was founded by Paul Reiche III, Fred Ford, and Terry Falls in 1989 and gained success in developing the first two Star Control games, and later made film-to-video game adaptions. Activision purchased the studio in 2005, and had given them work on some of the Tony Hawk's games as well as other licensed properties. Following Activision's merger with Vivendi, Activision gained the Spyro intellectual property and assigned Toys for Bob to develop the series in a new direction, leading to the toys-to-life Skylanders series.

=== Merger with Vivendi Games (2008) ===
While Activision was highly successful with its range of developers and successful series, Kotick was concerned that it did not have a title for the growing massively multiplayer online market, which presented the opportunity for continued revenues from subscription models and microtransactions instead of the revenue from a single sale. Around 2006, Kotick contacted Jean-Bernard Lévy, the new CEO of Vivendi, a French media conglomerate. Vivendi had a games division, Vivendi Games, that was struggling to be viable at the time, but its principal feature was that it owned Blizzard Entertainment and its highly successful World of Warcraft game, which was drawing in $1.1 billion a year in subscription fees. Vivendi Games also owned Sierra Entertainment.

Lévy recognized Kotick wanted control of World of Warcraft, and offered to allow the companies to merge, but only if Lévy held the majority shares in the merged group, forcing Kotick to cede control. Kotick fretted about this decision for a while, according to friends and investors. During this time in 2006–2007, some of Activision's former successful properties began to wane, such as Tony Hawk's, so Activision bought RedOctane, the publisher of the Guitar Hero franchise. Kotick met with Blizzard's president Mike Morhaime, and learned that Blizzard also had a successful inroad into getting their games into China, a potentially lucrative market. Given this potential opportunity, Kotick agreed to the merger.

Activision's board signed on to the merger by December 2007. The merger was completed in July 2008. The new company was called Activision Blizzard and was headed by Kotick, while Vivendi maintained a 52% share in the company. The new company was estimated to be worth US$18.9 billion, ahead of Electronic Arts, which was valued at US$14.1 billion.

=== Post-merger developments (2009–2022) ===
Activision Publishing remains a subsidiary of Activision Blizzard following the merger, and is responsible for developing, producing, and distributing games from its internal and subsidiary studios. Eric Hirshberg was announced as Activision Publishing's CEO in 2010.

Activision Publishing established Sledgehammer Games in November 2009. Formed earlier in 2009 by Glen Schofield and Michael Condrey, former Visceral Games leads that had worked on Dead Space, Sledgehammer intended to develop a Call of Duty spin-off title fashioned after the gameplay in Dead Space. However, in early 2010, legal issues between Infinity Ward and Activision Blizzard led to several members of Infinity Ward leaving, and Activision assigned Sledgehammer to assist Infinity Ward in the next major Call of Duty title, Modern Warfare 3. Since then, Sledgehammer, Infinity Ward, and Treyarch share development duties for the flagship series, with support from Raven and other studios as necessary.

In February 2010, Activision Blizzard reported significant losses in revenue stemming from a slow down in Guitar Hero sales and from its more casual games. Subsequently, Activision Publishing shuttered Red Octane, Luxoflux and Underground Development as well as laid off about 25% of the staff at Neversoft. Within the same year, Activision shuttered Budcat Creations in November 2010, and Bizarre Creations in February 2011. Also in 2010, Activision's deal with DreamWorks Animation expired, and the video game license was acquired by THQ.

Hirshberg left the CEO position in March 2018. On January 9, 2019, Activision Blizzard appointed Rob Kostich as president of Activision Publishing, as part of a broader executive reshuffle at the company. Before the promotion, Kostich was executive vice president and general manager of the Call of Duty franchise for more than ten years.

Into the 2020s, Activision put more focus on the Call of Duty franchise, including the release of the free-to-play Call of Duty: Warzone in 2020. By April 2021, the company had assigned all of its internal studios to work on some part of the Call of Duty franchise. This includes a new studio, Activision Mobile, devoted to the Call of Duty Mobile title as reported in August 2021.

In 2021, while all its employees were working remotely during the COVID-19 pandemic, Activision and its parent Activision Blizzard vacated its longtime headquarters building in Santa Monica and ended its lease with Boston Properties. In September 2021, it subleased a much smaller office space in Santa Monica at the Pen Factory (a former Paper Mate factory) from Kite Pharma, which had leased the space from Lincoln Property Company.

=== Purchase by Microsoft and absorption of select Xbox studios (2023–present) ===
With the acquisition of Activision Blizzard by Microsoft in October 2023, Activision Blizzard as a whole, including the Activision Publishing subdivision, became a separate division under the Xbox arm (at the time known as Microsoft Gaming) of Microsoft.

On March 8, 2024, 600 Activision QA workers in Texas, Minnesota and California unionized under the Communication Workers of America (CWA), marking it as the largest union in the United States video game industry.

On May 16, 2024, Activision announced the establishment of Warsaw-based studio Elsewhere Entertainment, assembled for the development of a new narrative-based AAA IP not associated with other Activision series like Call of Duty. The studio comprises various developers associated with other narrative-driven gaming franchises such as The Last of Us, Uncharted, The Witcher and Far Cry among others; at the time of announcement it was recruiting more staff to create a "state-of-the-art and next-generation gaming experience", as well as a franchise with "an enduring legacy that goes far beyond games."

In July 2024, the Screen Actors Guild-American Federation of Television and Radio Artists (SAG-AFTRA) actor labor union, which provides numerous video game voice actors, initiated a labor strike against a number of video publishers, including Activision, over concerns about lack of AI protections which concern not only video game actors, but also the use of AI to replicate an actor's voice, or create a digital replica of their likeness.

In September 2026, Xbox has transferred World’s Edge, Rare, and the Halo franchise from Xbox Game Studios to Activision with the company now being tasked to develop the next Halo game.

== Studios ==
Name	Headquarters	Founded	Acquired	Notable releases	Ref
Activision Shanghai Studio	in Shanghai, China	founded in 2009.			
Beenox	in Québec City, Canada	founded in May 2000	acquired on May 25, 2005.		
Emerging Franchises			successor to Toys for Bob's IPs kept by Xbox		
Demonware	in Dublin, Ireland	founded in 2003	acquired in May 2007.		
Digital Legends Entertainment	in Barcelona, Spain	founded in May 2001	acquired on October 28, 2021		
Elsewhere Entertainment	in Warsaw, Poland	founded on May 16, 2024.			
High Moon Studios	in Carlsbad, California, US	founded as Sammy Entertainment in April 2001	acquired by Vivendi Games in January 2006.		
Infinity Ward	in Woodland Hills, Los Angeles, California, US	founded in 2002	acquired in October 2003.		
Raven Software	in Madison, Wisconsin, US	founded in 1990	acquired in 1997		
Rare	in Twycross, England	founded in 1985	moved under Activision in 2026		
Sledgehammer Games	in San Francisco, California, US	founded in Foster City, California on July 21, 2009.			
Solid State Studios	in Santa Monica, California, US	founded in 2021			
Treyarch	in Playa Vista, Los Angeles, California, US	founded in 1996	acquired in 2001		
World's Edge	in Redmond, Washington	founded in 2019	moved under Activision in 2026		

=== Former studios ===
Name	Headquarters	Founded	Acquired	Fate	Notable releases	Ref
7 Studios	in Los Angeles, US	founded in 1999	acquired in April 2009	closed in February 2011		
Activision Value Publishing	in Minneapolis, US;	founded in 2000 as a merger of Activision subsidiaries Head Games Publishing, Expert Software and Elsinore Studio.				Closed in 2016.
Beachhead Studio	in Santa Monica, California, US	founded in February 2011.				
Bizarre Creations	Liverpool, England	founded as Raising Hell Productions in 1987 and changed name in 1994,	acquired on September 26, 2007			closed on February 18, 2011.
Budcat Creations	in Iowa City, Iowa, US	founded in September 2000	acquired on November 10, 2008	closed in November 2010.		
FreeStyleGames	in Leamington Spa, England	founded in 2002	acquired on September 12, 2008	sold to Ubisoft on January 18, 2017, subsequently renamed Ubisoft Leamington.		
Gray Matter Studios	in Los Angeles, US;	founded in the 1990s as Xatrix Entertainment	acquired in January 2002	merged into Treyarch in 2005.		
Infocom	in Cambridge, Massachusetts, US	founded on June 22, 1979	acquired in 1986	closed in 1989.		
Luxoflux	in Santa Monica, California, US	founded in January 1997	acquired in October 2002	closed on February 11, 2010.		
Massive Entertainment	in Malmö, Sweden	founded in 1997	acquired by Vivendi Universal Games in 2002	sold to Ubisoft on November 10, 2008.		
Neversoft	in Woodland Hills, Los Angeles, California, US	founded in July 1994	acquired in October 1999	merged into Infinity Ward on May 3, 2014		and was officially made defunct on July 10, 2014.
Radical Entertainment	in Vancouver, Canada	founded in 1991	acquired by Vivendi Games in 2005	laid off most staff in 2012.		
RedOctane	in Mountain View, California, US	founded in November 2005	acquired in 2006	closed on February 11, 2010.		
Shaba Games	in San Francisco, US	founded in September 1997	acquired in 2002	closed on October 8, 2009.		
Swordfish Studios	in Birmingham, England	founded in September 2002	acquired by Vivendi Universal Games in June 2005	sold to Codemasters on November 14, 2008.		
The Blast Furnace	in Leeds, England	founded in November 2011 as Activision Leeds	renamed in August 2012	closed in March 2014.		
Toys for Bob	in Novato, California, US	founded in 1989	acquired on May 3, 2005	spun off from Activision in May 2024.		
Underground Development	in Foster City, California, US	founded as Z-Axis in 1994	acquired in May 2002	closed on February 11, 2010.		
Vicarious Visions	in Albany, New York, US	founded in 1991	acquired in January 2005	moved to Blizzard Entertainment in January 2021.		It was renamed to Blizzard Albany on April 12, 2022.
Wanako Games	in Santiago, Chile	founded in 2002	acquired by Vivendi Games on February 20, 2007	sold to Artificial Mind and Movement on November 20, 2008.		

== Notable games published ==
=== 1980s ===
- Fishing Derby (1980)
- Boxing (1980)
- Skiing (1980)
- Freeway (1981)
- Ice Hockey (1981)
- Kaboom! (1981)
- Stampede (1981)
- Laser Blast (1981)
- Tennis (1981)
- Megamania (1982)
- Barnstorming (1982)
- Enduro (1982)
- Chopper Command (1982)
- Starmaster (1982)
- Pitfall! series (1982–2004)
- River Raid series (1982–1988)
- Oink! (1983)
- Keystone Kapers (1983)
- Beamrider (1983)
- Robot Tank (1983)
- H.E.R.O. (1984)
- Little Computer People (1985)
- Portal (1986)
- Hacker series (1985–1986)
- Shanghai series (1986–1990)
- Transformers series (1986, 2007–2017)
- The Last Ninja series (1987–1988)
- Deathtrack (1989)
- Tongue of the Fatman (1989)
- MechWarrior series (1989–1996)

=== 1990s ===
- Hunter (1991)
- Zork series (1993–1997)
- Dark Reign series (1997–2000)
- Heavy Gear series (1997–1999)
- Quake series (1997–2007)
- Interstate series (1997–1999)
- Battlezone series (1998–1999)
- SiN (1998)
- Heretic II (1998)
- Vigilante 8 series (1998–2008)
- Tenchu series (1998–2004)
- Call to Power series (1999–2000)
- Star Trek series (1999–2003)
- Tony Hawk's series (1999–2015, 2020, 2025)

=== 2000s ===
- Soldier of Fortune series (2000–2007)
- X-Men series (2000–2011)
- Spider-Man series (2000–2014)
- Lost Kingdoms series (2002–2003)
- Total War series (2002–2004)
- Call of Duty series (2003–present)
- True Crime series (2003–2005)
- Wolfenstein series (2003–2009)
- Shrek series (2004–2011)
- Doom 3 (2004)
- Madagascar series (2005–2011)
- The Movies (2005)
- Gun (2005)
- Guitar Hero series (2006–2015)
- Marvel: Ultimate Alliance series (2006–2009)
- Barbie series (2006–2009)
- Little League World Series Baseball series (2008–2010)
- James Bond series (2008–2012)
- Crash Bandicoot series (2008–present)
- Spyro the Dragon series (2008–2018)
- Prototype series (2009–2015)
- Ice Age series (2009–2012)

=== 2010s ===
- Blur (2010)
- Singularity (2010)
- NASCAR The Game series (2011–2013)
- Skylanders series (2011–2018)
- SpongeBob SquarePants series (2013–2015)
- Teenage Mutant Ninja Turtles series (2013–2016)
- Destiny series (2014–2018)
- Sekiro: Shadows Die Twice (2019)

== Awards ==
In 2003, the company was awarded the Game Developers Choice "First Penguin" award in recognition of its place as the first third-party developer.

== See also ==
- List of video game companies
