= Jim Levy =

American businessman

Jim Levy is an American businessman who began his career as a music industry executive before he became the founding chief executive officer for Activision.

Activision was founded on giving their game designers a lot of recognition for their work. It is for this reason that he promoted his game designers like rock stars. Each game's instruction booklet would have a brief biography of the developer, as well as their autograph. He also was a driving force in the acquisition of Infocom. In 1986, he resigned his position, also at a time when games required more than one person to be involved in a game, therefore his style of recognition became less effective.
