= Retro Classics =

Video game compilation

- Developer: Antstream Arcade
- Type: Classic video game distribution and emulation
- Launched: May 21, 2025
- Platforms: Windows; Xbox One; Xbox Series X/S
- Status: Active
- Website: Official website

Retro Classics is a line of emulated retro games from the Activision Blizzard library (Activision, Blizzard Entertainment and Sierra Entertainment) as a collaboration between Antstream Arcade and Xbox Game Studios. Along with a selection of games, the application features community-based challenges, leaderboards, new challenge modes and high score rankings.

The service is available via an Xbox Game Pass subscription. The service is available through Xbox One, Xbox Series X/S and Xbox on PC, or streaming on supported LG and Samsung Smart TVs, Amazon Fire TV devices, and Meta Quest headsets, as well as the above mentioned platforms.

== Games ==
As of February 2026, there are 108 games available on Retro Classics.

Games in the collection
Title	Atari 2600	Amiga	MS-DOS Windows 9x	PlayStation	Sega Genesis Sega CD/32X	Super NES	Release date
Activision Prototype #1	Yes	—N/a	—N/a	—N/a	—N/a	—N/a	May 21, 2025
The Adventures of Willy Beamish	—N/a	Yes	—N/a	—N/a	Yes	—N/a	May 21, 2025 (Amiga); August 14, 2025 (Sega CD)
Atlantis	Yes	—N/a	—N/a	—N/a	—N/a	—N/a	May 21, 2025
Atlantis II	Yes	—N/a	—N/a	—N/a	—N/a	—N/a	May 21, 2025
Barnstorming	Yes	—N/a	—N/a	—N/a	—N/a	—N/a	May 21, 2025
Baseball	Yes	—N/a	—N/a	—N/a	—N/a	—N/a	May 21, 2025
BattleTech: The Crescent Hawk's Inception	—N/a	Yes	—N/a	—N/a	—N/a	—N/a	October 15, 2025
BattleTech: The Crescent Hawk's Revenge	—N/a	—N/a	Yes	—N/a	—N/a	—N/a	October 15, 2025
Beamrider	Yes	—N/a	—N/a	—N/a	—N/a	—N/a	May 21, 2025
Beyond Zork - The Coconut of Quendor	—N/a	—N/a	Yes	—N/a	—N/a	—N/a	February 19, 2026
Blackthorne	—N/a	—N/a	—N/a	—N/a	Yes	Yes	November 13, 2025
Bloody Human Freeway	Yes	—N/a	—N/a	—N/a	—N/a	—N/a	May 21, 2025
Boxing	Yes	—N/a	—N/a	—N/a	—N/a	—N/a	May 21, 2025
Bridge	Yes	—N/a	—N/a	—N/a	—N/a	—N/a	May 21, 2025
Caesar	—N/a	Yes	—N/a	—N/a	—N/a	—N/a	July 21, 2025
Caesar II	—N/a	—N/a	Yes	—N/a	—N/a	—N/a	May 21, 2025
Caesar III	—N/a	—N/a	Yes	—N/a	—N/a	—N/a	August 14, 2025
Checkers	Yes	—N/a	—N/a	—N/a	—N/a	—N/a	May 21, 2025
Chopper Command	Yes	—N/a	—N/a	—N/a	—N/a	—N/a	May 21, 2025
Climber 5	Yes	—N/a	—N/a	—N/a	—N/a	—N/a	August 14, 2025
Codename: ICEMAN	—N/a	—N/a	Yes	—N/a	—N/a	—N/a	December 16, 2025
The Colonel's Bequest	—N/a	Yes	—N/a	—N/a	—N/a	—N/a	August 14, 2025
Commando	Yes	—N/a	—N/a	—N/a	—N/a	—N/a	May 21, 2025
Conquests of Camelot: The Search for the Grail	—N/a	Yes	—N/a	—N/a	—N/a	—N/a	July 21, 2025
Conquests of the Longbow: The Legend of Robin Hood	—N/a	—N/a	Yes	—N/a	—N/a	—N/a	May 21, 2025
Cosmic Ark	Yes	—N/a	—N/a	—N/a	—N/a	—N/a	May 21, 2025
Cosmic Commuter	Yes	—N/a	—N/a	—N/a	—N/a	—N/a	June 23, 2025
Crackpots	Yes	—N/a	—N/a	—N/a	—N/a	—N/a	May 21, 2025
The Dagger of Amon Ra	—N/a	—N/a	Yes	—N/a	—N/a	—N/a	May 21, 2025
Decathlon	Yes	—N/a	—N/a	—N/a	—N/a	—N/a	May 21, 2025
Demon Attack	Yes	—N/a	—N/a	—N/a	—N/a	—N/a	May 21, 2025
Dolphin	Yes	—N/a	—N/a	—N/a	—N/a	—N/a	May 21, 2025
Dragonfire	Yes	—N/a	—N/a	—N/a	—N/a	—N/a	September 17, 2025
Dragster	Yes	—N/a	—N/a	—N/a	—N/a	—N/a	May 21, 2025
Enduro	Yes	—N/a	—N/a	—N/a	—N/a	—N/a	May 21, 2025
Fathom	Yes	—N/a	—N/a	—N/a	—N/a	—N/a	May 21, 2025
Fire Fighter	Yes	—N/a	—N/a	—N/a	—N/a	—N/a	May 21, 2025
Fishing Derby	Yes	—N/a	—N/a	—N/a	—N/a	—N/a	May 21, 2025
Freddy Pharkas: Frontier Pharmacist	—N/a	—N/a	Yes	—N/a	—N/a	—N/a	May 21, 2025
Freeway	Yes	—N/a	—N/a	—N/a	—N/a	—N/a	May 21, 2025
Frostbite	Yes	—N/a	—N/a	—N/a	—N/a	—N/a	May 21, 2025
Gabriel Knight: Sins of the Fathers	—N/a	—N/a	Yes	—N/a	—N/a	—N/a	July 21, 2025
Grand Prix	Yes	—N/a	—N/a	—N/a	—N/a	—N/a	May 21, 2025
H.E.R.O.	Yes	—N/a	—N/a	—N/a	—N/a	—N/a	May 21, 2025
Hard Head	Yes	—N/a	—N/a	—N/a	—N/a	—N/a	July 21, 2025
Heart of China	—N/a	—N/a	Yes	—N/a	—N/a	—N/a	June 23, 2025
Ice Hockey	Yes	—N/a	—N/a	—N/a	—N/a	—N/a	October 15, 2025
Kabobber	Yes	—N/a	—N/a	—N/a	—N/a	—N/a	February 19, 2026
Kaboom!	Yes	—N/a	—N/a	—N/a	—N/a	—N/a	May 21, 2025
Keystone Kapers	Yes	—N/a	—N/a	—N/a	—N/a	—N/a	January 15, 2026
Laser Blast	Yes	—N/a	—N/a	—N/a	—N/a	—N/a	May 21, 2025
Laser Gates	Yes	—N/a	—N/a	—N/a	—N/a	—N/a	January 15, 2026
The Lost Vikings	—N/a	—N/a	—N/a	—N/a	—N/a	Yes	November 13, 2025
The Lost Vikings 2	—N/a	—N/a	—N/a	Yes	—N/a	Yes	November 13, 2025
MechWarrior	—N/a	—N/a	—N/a	—N/a	—N/a	Yes	May 21, 2025
MechWarrior 2	—N/a	—N/a	—N/a	Yes	—N/a	—N/a	May 21, 2025
Megamania	Yes	—N/a	—N/a	—N/a	—N/a	—N/a	May 21, 2025
Moonsweeper	Yes	—N/a	—N/a	—N/a	—N/a	—N/a	October 15, 2025
Okie Dokie	Yes	—N/a	—N/a	—N/a	—N/a	—N/a	July 21, 2025
Oystron	Yes	—N/a	—N/a	—N/a	—N/a	—N/a	August 14, 2025
Pitfall!	Yes	—N/a	—N/a	—N/a	—N/a	—N/a	May 21, 2025
Pitfall II: Lost Caverns	Yes	—N/a	—N/a	—N/a	—N/a	—N/a	May 21, 2025
Plaque Attack	Yes	—N/a	—N/a	—N/a	—N/a	—N/a	December 16, 2025
Police Quest: In Pursuit of the Death Angel	—N/a	Yes	—N/a	—N/a	—N/a	—N/a	May 21, 2025
Police Quest II: The Vengeance	—N/a	Yes	—N/a	—N/a	—N/a	—N/a	December 16, 2025
Pressure Cooker	Yes	—N/a	—N/a	—N/a	—N/a	—N/a	May 21, 2025
Private Eye	Yes	—N/a	—N/a	—N/a	—N/a	—N/a	August 14, 2025
Quest for Glory I	—N/a	—N/a	Yes	—N/a	—N/a	—N/a	May 21, 2025
Quick Step	Yes	—N/a	—N/a	—N/a	—N/a	—N/a	September 17, 2025
Return to Zork	—N/a	—N/a	Yes	—N/a	—N/a	—N/a	February 19, 2026
Riddle of the Sphinx	Yes	—N/a	—N/a	—N/a	—N/a	—N/a	May 21, 2025
River Raid	Yes	—N/a	—N/a	—N/a	—N/a	—N/a	May 21, 2025
River Raid II	Yes	—N/a	—N/a	—N/a	—N/a	—N/a	May 21, 2025
Rise of the Dragon	—N/a	Yes	—N/a	—N/a	—N/a	—N/a	January 15, 2026
Robot Tank	Yes	—N/a	—N/a	—N/a	—N/a	—N/a	May 21, 2025
Rock n' Roll Racing	—N/a	—N/a	—N/a	—N/a	—N/a	Yes	November 13, 2025
RPM Racing	—N/a	—N/a	—N/a	—N/a	—N/a	Yes	November 13, 2025
Seaquest	Yes	—N/a	—N/a	—N/a	—N/a	—N/a	February 19, 2026
Shootin' Gallery	Yes	—N/a	—N/a	—N/a	—N/a	—N/a	August 14, 2025
Skate Boardin'	Yes	—N/a	—N/a	—N/a	—N/a	—N/a	July 21, 2025
Skeleton+	Yes	—N/a	—N/a	—N/a	—N/a	—N/a	July 21, 2025
Skiing	Yes	—N/a	—N/a	—N/a	—N/a	—N/a	June 23, 2025
Sky Jinks	Yes	—N/a	—N/a	—N/a	—N/a	—N/a	May 21, 2025
Solar Storm	Yes	—N/a	—N/a	—N/a	—N/a	—N/a	June 23, 2025
Space Quest: The Sarien Encounter	—N/a	Yes	—N/a	—N/a	—N/a	—N/a	September 17, 2025
Space Quest II	—N/a	Yes	—N/a	—N/a	—N/a	—N/a	May 21, 2025
Space Quest III: The Pirates of Pestulon	—N/a	Yes	—N/a	—N/a	—N/a	—N/a	September 17, 2025
Space Quest 6: Roger Wilco in the Spinal Frontier	—N/a	—N/a	Yes	—N/a	—N/a	—N/a	May 21, 2025
Space Shuttle: A Journey into Space	Yes	—N/a	—N/a	—N/a	—N/a	—N/a	December 16, 2025
Space Treat Deluxe	Yes	—N/a	—N/a	—N/a	—N/a	—N/a	May 21, 2025
Spider Fighter	Yes	—N/a	—N/a	—N/a	—N/a	—N/a	May 21, 2025
Stampede	Yes	—N/a	—N/a	—N/a	—N/a	—N/a	February 19, 2026
Star Voyager	Yes	—N/a	—N/a	—N/a	—N/a	—N/a	May 21, 2025
Sky Patrol	Yes	—N/a	—N/a	—N/a	—N/a	—N/a	January 15, 2026
Subterranea	Yes	—N/a	—N/a	—N/a	—N/a	—N/a	June 23, 2025
Tennis	Yes	—N/a	—N/a	—N/a	—N/a	—N/a	May 21, 2025
Thwocker	Yes	—N/a	—N/a	—N/a	—N/a	—N/a	May 21, 2025
Title Match Pro Wrestling	Yes	—N/a	—N/a	—N/a	—N/a	—N/a	May 21, 2025
Torin's Passage	—N/a	—N/a	Yes	—N/a	—N/a	—N/a	May 21, 2025
Trick Shot	Yes	—N/a	—N/a	—N/a	—N/a	—N/a	May 21, 2025
Vault Assault	Yes	—N/a	—N/a	—N/a	—N/a	—N/a	May 21, 2025
Venetian Blinds	Yes	—N/a	—N/a	—N/a	—N/a	—N/a	May 21, 2025
Wing War	Yes	—N/a	—N/a	—N/a	—N/a	—N/a	August 14, 2025
Zork I	—N/a	—N/a	Yes	—N/a	—N/a	—N/a	May 21, 2025
Zork Zero	—N/a	—N/a	Yes	—N/a	—N/a	—N/a	May 21, 2025
