= Super Pocket =

Handheld game console

- Developer: HyperMegaTech!
- Type: Handheld game console
- Generation: Ninth
- Released: 14 November 2023
- Introductory price: £49/$59/€59
- Media: ROM cartridge
- CPU: 1.2 GHz
- Display: 2.8-inch IPS screen, 320 x 240 pixels
- Dimensions: 78mm x 125mm x 25mm (3 x 4.9 x 0.98 in)
- Weight: 165 grams
- Related: Evercade
- Website: www.hypermegatech.com

The Super Pocket is a handheld game console developed by HyperMegaTech!, a brand of British company Blaze Entertainment as a budget alternative to their Evercade consoles. In addition to built-in collections of retro video games, the console features a cartridge slot and is compatible with all of Blaze's Evercade cartridges, despite not being branded as an Evercade device. The console was released on 14 November 2023.

== History ==
The Super Pocket was unveiled in July 2023. That September, units were on exhibit for testing at London's WASD Gaming Expo in partnership with IGN. At launch, it was available in two versions offering distinct color schemes. One version was branded as Capcom with the inclusion of 12 built-in games, while the other included seventeen games from Taito. In addition to the built-in games, the handheld features a cartridge slot that allows it to play all Evercade cartridges. The initial expected launch window was 22 October 2023 with pre-orders opening immediately upon announcement. The Super Pocket was the first console by HyperMegaTech!, a brand of Blaze Entertainment.

== Hardware ==
The Super Pocket has an overall form factor dimensions of 3 x 0.49 x 0.98 inches (7.8 x 1.25 x 2.5 cm) at a weight of approximately 165 grams with a cartridge inserted, with a similar design to the original Game Boy. It includes a 3.5in headphone jack and a USB-C charging port. As a display, the unit features a 320 x 240 px 2.8-inch IPS screen. It is powered by a 1.2 GHz quad-core processor. For controls, the handheld features a traditional D-pad, four face buttons, and start and select buttons. The rear houses four bumper/trigger buttons. The firmware is updateable through the system's USB-C port and a PC-based updater app.

== Games ==
Each edition features built-in games from the respective publishers. Additionally, the Super Pocket is compatible with all Evercade cartridges.

Games without a version specified are the arcade versions.

Some games are also available on Evercade cartridges and devices. Games currently exclusive to the Super Pockets are in bold.

Super Pocket Built-In Game List
| Device # | Title | # of games | Games included | Release date |
|---|---|---|---|---|
| 1 | Taito Edition | 18 | Bubble Bobble; Cadash; Chack'n Pop; Don Doko Don; Elevator Action; The Fairyland Story; Football Champ; Growl; Kiki Kaikai; The Legend of Kage; Liquid Kids; The NewZealand Story; Operation Wolf; Puzzle Bobble; Rastan; Space Invaders; **Space Invaders '91 (Genesis)**; Volfied | 14 November 2023 |
| 2 | Capcom Edition | 12 | 1942; 1943: The Battle of Midway; 1944: The Loop Master; Bionic Commando; Captain Commando; Final Fight; Forgotten Worlds; Ghouls 'n Ghosts; Mega Man (NES); Mercs; Street Fighter II': Hyper Fighting; Strider | 14 November 2023 |
| 3 | Atari Edition | 50 | **Arcade**: Asteroids; Berzerk; Canyon Bomber; Crystal Castles; Frenzy; Liberator; Lost Tomb; Millipede; Missile Command; Night Driver; Pong; Sky Diver; Super Breakout; **Atari 2600**: Adventure; Aquaventure; **Dark Cavern**; Gravitar; Haunted House; Radar Lock; **Save Mary**; Solaris; Street Racer; Submarine Commander; Tempest; Video Pinball; Wizard; Yars' Revenge; **Atari 5200**: **Bounty Bob Strikes Back**; **Countermeasure**; **Final Legacy**; **Miner 2049er**; **Xari Arena**; **Atari 7800**: Alien Brigade; Asteroids; Centipede; Dark Chambers; Desert Falcon; **Fatal Run**; Food Fight; Motor Psycho; Ninja Golf; **Atari Lynx**: Basketbrawl; Checkered Flag; **Dirty Larry: Renegade Cop**; **Kung Food**; **Robo-Squash**; Scrapyard Dog; Super Asteroids & Missile Command; **Turbo Sub**; **Warbirds** | 22 October 2024 |
| 4 | Technōs Edition | 15 | Block Out; The Combatribes; Crash 'n' the Boys: Street Challenge (NES); **Double Dragon**; **Double Dragon (GB)**; Double Dragon (NES); Double Dragon II: The Revenge; Double Dragon 3: The Rosetta Stone; Minky Monkey; Mysterious Stones: Dr John's Adventure; **Renegade**; River City Ransom (NES); **Super Dodge Ball**; Super Double Dragon (SNES); Super Spike V'Ball (NES) | 22 October 2024 |
| 5 | Neo Geo Edition | 14 | **Alpha Mission II**; Blazing Star; Fatal Fury Special; **King of the Monsters 2: The Next Thing**; **The Last Blade**; **Last Resort**; **Metal Slug X**; **Mutation Nation**; **Over Top**; Samurai Shodown II; **Sengoku 3**; **Shock Troopers: 2nd Squad**; **Soccer Brawl**; **Top Hunter: Roddy & Cathy** | 10 July 2025 |
| 6 | Data East Edition | 18 | B-Wings; Bad Dudes Vs. DragonNinja; BreakThru; BurgerTime; **Burnin' Rubber**; Chain Reaction; The Cliffhanger: Edward Randy; Crude Buster; Gate of Doom; Joe & Mac Returns; **Joe & Mac: Caveman Ninja**; **Karate Champ**; Lock 'n' Chase; Peter Pepper's Ice Cream Factory; **Spinmaster (Neo Geo)**; Super BurgerTime; Tumblepop; Wizard Fire | 10 July 2025 |
| 7 | Rare Edition | 14 | Atic Atac (ZX Spectrum); Banjo-Kazooie (native port); Battletoads (NES); **Battletoads in Battlemaniacs (SNES)**; Cobra Triangle (NES); Conker's Pocket Tales (GBC); Gunfright (ZX Spectrum); Jetpac (ZX Spectrum); Knight Lore (ZX Spectrum); Lunar Jetman (ZX Spectrum); **R.C. Pro-Am II (NES)**; **Slalom (NES)**; **Snake Rattle 'n' Roll (NES)**; **Solar Jetman (NES)** | 26 June 2026 |
| 8 | Activision Edition | 34 | Barnstorming; Beamrider; Boxing; Checkers; Chopper Command; Cosmic Commuter; Demon Attack; Dolphin; Dragonfire; Enduro; Grand Prix; H.E.R.O.; Kabobber; Kaboom!; Keystone Kapers; Laser Blast; Megamania; Moonsweeper; Oink!; Pitfall!; Pitfall II: Lost Caverns; Plaque Attack; Pressure Cooker; Private Eye; River Raid; River Raid II; Robot Tank; Seaquest; Skiing; Sky Jinks; Spider Fighter; Stampede; Starmaster; Thwocker; All games are the Atari 2600 versions. | September 2026 |
