= Activision Anthology =

- Cover art for the PlayStation 2 version
- Developers: Barking Lizards (PS2); Contraband Entertainment (PS2); MumboJumbo (Windows); MacPlay (Mac); Aspyr (GBA); Nikkō Europe (digiBLAST); Digital Eclipse (PSP); Code Mystics (mobile)
- Publisher: Activision
- Platforms: PlayStation 2, Windows, Macintosh, Game Boy Advance, digiBlast, PlayStation Portable, iOS, Android
- Release: PlayStation 2: NA: November 21, 2002; EU: March 6, 2003; Windows/Mac: NA: October 6, 2003; GBA: NA: December 8, 2003; DigiBlast: EU: December 31, 2005; PSP: NA: November 8, 2006; EU: February 9, 2007; AU: February 14, 2007; iOS/Android: NA: August 30, 2012
- Genre: Various
- Modes: Single-player, multiplayer

Activision Anthology is a compilation of most of the Atari 2600 games by Activision for various game systems. It also includes games that were originally released by Absolute Entertainment and Imagic, as well as various homebrew games. The Microsoft Windows and Mac OS X versions are titled Activision Anthology: Remix Edition, and include the most games. The PlayStation Portable version is titled Activision Hits Remixed.

The game features the original gameplay of the Atari 2600 emulated on modern systems. After achieving high scores in some of the games, the player can unlock special modes where the colors are distorted, or the game is projected on a rotating cube as added difficulty.

Activision Anthology uses a virtual child's bedroom as the main menu. The player can select several viewpoints to check high scores, choose a video game cartridge from a rotating stand, change the background music on a virtual tape deck, or change game settings while being zoomed in on a virtual Atari 2600. The virtual tape deck features several licensed 1980s music tracks. The music from the virtual tape deck can be mixed with the Atari 2600 game audio so both are audible to simulate playing the game on TV while having the tape running in the background.

Six Activision-produced Atari 2600 titles were not included in Activision Anthology, likely due to outside ownership of their respective licenses. The excluded games are Commando, Double Dragon, Ghostbusters, Ghostbusters II, Kung Fu Master, and Rampage, although Capcom did give Activision rights to put Commando in the PlayStation 2, Windows, and Mac OS X versions of Activision Anthology. Ghostbusters II was cancelled before Activision could release it, but Salu released it in Europe under their name in 1992. The Absolute Entertainment title Pete Rose Baseball was renamed Baseball.

== Portable versions ==
The Game Boy Advance version has the most games out of the portable versions, including seven homebrew games that do not appear in any of the other versions. It does not include the 19 Imagic games or Commando, nor does it play music during gameplay. It does have four custom 1980s-style music tracks that play in the menu screens, however.

The PlayStation Portable version includes three of the Imagic games, Atlantis, Demon Attack, and Moonsweeper, nearly all of the Activision games, full-speed emulation, and the 1980s songs featured in the PlayStation 2 and computer versions, but does not include Commando, the four Absolute Entertainment games, games exclusive to the other releases, or the homebrew titles. The PSP version also lacks the ability to save high scores and unlocked extras despite that option appears in the main menu, thus when the player quits out of the game all progress will be lost.

There was also a version released on mobile phones with three titles. It included H.E.R.O., Pitfall!, and River Raid.

A version for the digiBlast was released on December 31, 2005, which included 5 titles. These titles are H.E.R.O., Tennis, Megamania, Grand Prix, and Demon Attack.

Activision Anthology was released for Android and iOS devices on August 30, 2012. The game Kaboom! is offered as an initial free game, while the rest of the games were offered as an in-app purchase. These versions include the Imagic game Dragonfire, but do not include the homebrew games, the games by Absolute Entertainment, or Commando. These versions also do not contain any of the licensed 1980s music.

== Game list ==
There are a total of 76 games in each version combined. Certain games do not appear in some versions and are mentioned accordingly.

Titles included in the respective versions
TITLE	Original Release	Windows	Mac	PS2	GBA	digiBlast	Android	iOS	PSP	Producer	Comments
Activision prototype #1	—N/a	Yes	Yes	No	Yes	No	No	No	No	Activision	Unknown prototype
Atlantis	1982	Yes	Yes	Yes	No	No	Yes	Yes	Yes	Imagic	
Atlantis II	1982	Yes	Yes	No	No	No	No	No	No	Imagic	
Barnstorming	1982	Yes	Yes	Yes	Yes	No	Yes	Yes	Yes	Activision	
Baseball	1988	Yes	Yes	Yes	Yes	No	No	No	No	Absolute Entertainment	Originally titled Pete Rose Baseball
Beamrider	1983	Yes	Yes	Yes	Yes	No	Yes	Yes	Yes	Activision	
Bloody Human Freeway	—N/a	Yes	Yes	No	Yes	No	No	No	No	Activision	Originally unreleased version of Freeway
Boxing	1980	Yes	Yes	Yes	Yes	No	Yes	Yes	Yes	Activision	
Bridge	1980	Yes	Yes	Yes	Yes	No	Yes	Yes	Yes	Activision	
Checkers	1980	Yes	Yes	Yes	Yes	No	Yes	Yes	Yes	Activision	
Chopper Command	1982	Yes	Yes	Yes	Yes	No	Yes	Yes	Yes	Activision	
Climber 5	—N/a	Yes	Yes	No	Yes	No	No	No	No	Homebrew	
Commando	1988	Yes	Yes	Yes	No	No	No	No	No	Activision	
Cosmic Ark	1982	Yes	Yes	No	No	No	No	No	No	Imagic	
Cosmic Commuter	1984	Yes	Yes	Yes	Yes	No	Yes	Yes	Yes	Activision	
Crackpots	1983	Yes	Yes	Yes	Yes	No	Yes	Yes	Yes	Activision	
Decathlon	1983	Yes	Yes	Yes	Yes	No	Yes	Yes	Yes	Activision	
Demon Attack	1982	Yes	Yes	Yes	No	Yes	Yes	Yes	Yes	Imagic	
Dolphin	1983	Yes	Yes	Yes	Yes	No	Yes	Yes	Yes	Activision	
Dragonfire	1982	Yes	Yes	No	No	No	Yes	Yes	No	Imagic	
Dragster	1980	Yes	Yes	Yes	Yes	No	Yes	Yes	Yes	Activision	
Enduro	1983	Yes	Yes	Yes	Yes	No	Yes	Yes	Yes	Activision	
Fathom	1983	Yes	Yes	No	No	No	No	No	No	Imagic	
Fire Fighter	1982	Yes	Yes	No	No	No	No	No	No	Imagic	
Fishing Derby	1980	Yes	Yes	Yes	Yes	No	Yes	Yes	Yes	Activision	
Freeway	1981	Yes	Yes	Yes	Yes	No	Yes	Yes	Yes	Activision	
Frostbite	1983	Yes	Yes	Yes	Yes	No	Yes	Yes	Yes	Activision	
Grand Prix	1982	Yes	Yes	Yes	Yes	Yes	Yes	Yes	Yes	Activision	
H.E.R.O.	1984	Yes	Yes	Yes	Yes	Yes	Yes	Yes	Yes	Activision	
Hard Head	—N/a	Yes	Yes	No	Yes	No	No	No	No	Activision	Unreleased prototype
Ice Hockey	1981	Yes	Yes	Yes	Yes	No	Yes	Yes	Yes	Activision	
Kabobber	—N/a	Yes	Yes	Yes	Yes	No	Yes	Yes	Yes	Activision	Previously unreleased
Kaboom!	1981	Yes	Yes	Yes	Yes	No	Yes	Yes	Yes	Activision	
Keystone Kapers	1983	Yes	Yes	Yes	Yes	No	Yes	Yes	Yes	Activision	
Laser Blast	1981	Yes	Yes	Yes	Yes	No	Yes	Yes	Yes	Activision	
Laser Gates	1983	Yes	Yes	No	No	No	No	No	No	Imagic	
Megamania	1982	Yes	Yes	Yes	Yes	Yes	Yes	Yes	Yes	Activision	
Moonsweeper	1983	Yes	Yes	Yes	No	No	Yes	Yes	Yes	Imagic	
No Escape!	1983	Yes	Yes	No	No	No	No	No	No	Imagic	
Oink!	1983	Yes	Yes	Yes	Yes	No	Yes	Yes	Yes	Activision	
Okie Dokie	—N/a	Yes	Yes	No	Yes	No	No	No	No	Homebrew	
Oystron	1997	Yes	Yes	No	Yes	No	No	No	No	Homebrew	
Pitfall!	1982	Yes	Yes	Yes	Yes	No	Yes	Yes	Yes	Activision	
Pitfall II: Lost Caverns	1984	Yes	Yes	Yes	Yes	No	Yes	Yes	Yes	Activision	
Plaque Attack	1983	Yes	Yes	Yes	Yes	No	Yes	Yes	Yes	Activision	
Pressure Cooker	1983	Yes	Yes	Yes	Yes	No	Yes	Yes	Yes	Activision	
Private Eye	1984	Yes	Yes	Yes	Yes	No	Yes	Yes	Yes	Activision	
Quick Step	1983	Yes	Yes	No	No	No	No	No	No	Imagic	
Riddle of the Sphinx	1982	Yes	Yes	No	No	No	No	No	No	Imagic	
River Raid	1982	Yes	Yes	Yes	Yes	No	Yes	Yes	Yes	Activision	
River Raid II	1988	Yes	Yes	Yes	Yes	No	Yes	Yes	Yes	Activision	
Robot Tank	1983	Yes	Yes	Yes	Yes	No	Yes	Yes	Yes	Activision	
Seaquest	1983	Yes	Yes	Yes	Yes	No	Yes	Yes	Yes	Activision	
Shootin' Gallery	1983	Yes	Yes	No	No	No	No	No	No	Imagic	
Skate Boardin'	1987	Yes	Yes	No	Yes	No	No	No	No	Absolute Entertainment	
Skeleton+	—N/a	Yes	Yes	No	Yes	No	No	No	No	Homebrew	
Skiing	1980	Yes	Yes	Yes	Yes	No	Yes	Yes	Yes	Activision	
Sky Jinks	1982	Yes	Yes	Yes	Yes	No	Yes	Yes	Yes	Activision	
Sky Patrol	—N/a	Yes	Yes	No	No	No	No	No	No	Imagic	Unreleased prototype
Solar Storm	1983	Yes	Yes	No	No	No	No	No	No	Imagic	
Space Shuttle	1983	Yes	Yes	Yes	Yes	No	Yes	Yes	Yes	Activision	
Space Treat Deluxe	—N/a	Yes	Yes	No	Yes	No	No	No	No	Homebrew	
Spider Fighter	1983	Yes	Yes	Yes	Yes	No	Yes	Yes	Yes	Activision	
Stampede	1981	Yes	Yes	Yes	Yes	No	Yes	Yes	Yes	Activision	
Starmaster	1982	Yes	Yes	Yes	Yes	No	Yes	Yes	Yes	Activision	
Star Voyager	1982	Yes	Yes	No	No	No	No	No	No	Imagic	
Subterranea	1983	Yes	Yes	No	No	No	No	No	No	Imagic	
Tennis	1981	Yes	Yes	Yes	Yes	Yes	Yes	Yes	Yes	Activision	
Thwocker	—N/a	Yes	Yes	Yes	Yes	No	Yes	Yes	Yes	Activision	Unreleased prototype
Title Match Pro Wrestling	1987	Yes	Yes	Yes	Yes	No	No	No	No	Absolute Entertainment	
Tomcat F14	1988	Yes	Yes	Yes	Yes	No	No	No	No	Absolute Entertainment	
Trick Shot	1982	Yes	Yes	No	No	No	No	No	No	Imagic	
Vault Assault	—N/a	Yes	Yes	No	Yes	No	No	No	No	Homebrew	
Venetian Blinds	—N/a	Yes	Yes	No	Yes	No	No	No	No	Activision	Unreleased technology demo
Video Euchre	—N/a	Yes	Yes	No	Yes	No	No	No	No	Homebrew	
Wing War	1983	Yes	Yes	No	No	No	No	No	No	Imagic	
TITLE	Original Release	Windows	Mac	PS2	GBA	DigiBlast	Android	iOS	PSP	Producer	Comments

== Reviews ==
Reception

Review scores
Publication	Score
GameSpot	7.3/10
GameSpy	80/100
IGN	8.5/10

The game received generally positive reviews and was mainly praised on the Internet because of its spirited homage to the Atari 2600.
