= Venetian Blinds (video game) =

1982 simulation video game demo

- In-game screenshot
- Developers: David Crane; Bob Whitehead
- Publisher: Activision
- Platforms: Atari 2600 (initial); Windows, macOS, Game Boy Advance, Xbox 360, Windows Phone 7 (later ports)
- Release: 2003; 23 years ago (public release)
- Genre: Simulation

Venetian Blinds is a simulation video game developed by Activision co-founders David Crane and Bob Whitehead for the Atari 2600. The game simulates the raising and lowering of Venetian blinds on a window, and was facetiously presented as a technology demonstration of Whitehead's graphical programming technique of the same name, although it does not use the technique.

Venetian Blinds was created as a tongue-in-cheek in-joke in 1982 relating to a then-ongoing lawsuit between Activision and Atari, Inc. about the use of Whitehead's technique. The game was only shown internally and to people familiar with the lawsuit, and was not released publicly until 2003, as part of Activision Anthology for Windows, macOS, and Game Boy Advance. It was later released as a standalone title in 2010 through the Game Room service for Windows, Xbox 360, and Windows Phone 7.

== Gameplay ==
The player controls grey Venetian blinds on an olive window in a brown room. The blinds can be raised and lowered by pressing the joystick up and down. When the blinds are raised, they reveal a detailed sunset behind a green valley. In the bottom-left corner of the screen is the Activision logo, a feature of most Activision games of the era.

== Development ==
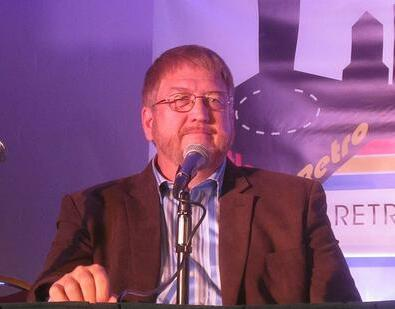
David Crane, one of the developers of Venetian Blinds, at a panel in 2011

The Venetian blinds technique was created by American video game developer Bob Whitehead while working for Atari, Inc., for the game Video Chess. The technique was created to circumvent the Atari 2600's hardware limitations, which prevented it from rendering more than six unique sprites simultaneously on a single horizontal scan line. Though some Atari 2600 games used techniques such as alternating sprite flickering or hiding different sprites per frame to create the illusion of multiple moving sprites at once, these often irritated players or displayed improperly in videos with certain frame rates. The Venetian blinds technique drew every other horizontal (Note: Bad Game Hall of Fame states these are vertical lines, but this is incorrect.) line of a sprite, which "left you with sprites that looked like they had stripes". This allowed developers to get around the limitation by offsetting every second sprite vertically, lining up rows of pixels with rows of empty space. Its name comes from its resemblance to Venetian blinds. In Video Chess, the technique is used to simulate up to eight chess pieces on the same row using only four sprites.

Activision was formed in 1979 by Whitehead, David Crane, Larry Kaplan, and Alan Miller. These developers had left Atari over low pay, lack of recognition, and Atari's policy of not crediting game developers to ensure they did not get scouted by rival companies and to reduce their leverage in contract negotiations. The releases of several successful Atari 2600 games by Activision in 1980, such as Boxing, Bridge, Checkers, Dragster, and Fishing Derby, prompted Atari to attempt to tarnish Activision's reputation, first through attack ads and then, by the end of 1980, a lawsuit alleging Whitehead, Crane, Kaplan, and Miller had violated non-disclosure agreements and stolen trade secrets, including the Venetian blinds technique, despite Activision having then not published any games using said technique. Atari was reportedly not expecting to win the lawsuit, but was merely using it as a scare tactic to pressure Activision into leaving the video game industry, dissuade others from doing business with them, or otherwise hinder them with costly legal proceedings.

Although the Activision team members were aware they had not actually stolen anything from Atari, morale still plummeted as a result of the lawsuit. In response, Crane and Whitehead developed Venetian Blinds as an in-joke. Crane said that the sunset in the window was a new and unique innovation.

Activision brought Venetian Blinds to the 1982 Consumer Electronics Show at McCormick Place in Chicago, but it was not on public display. Crane privately displayed the demo to people familiar with the lawsuit, and asked them, "Is this what Atari means by the Venetian Blind Technique?" It is often claimed that these people were Atari's lawyers, but this is a rumor stemming from a misreporting of events by the Atari history fansite AtariProtos, which had first revealed the existence of Venetian Blinds on the internet on October 18, 2002, per information from an Activision employee.

Atari and Activision eventually dropped the lawsuit in 1982 under unclear circumstances, most likely an out-of-court settlement, with Activision agreeing to pay royalties to Atari but otherwise legitimizing the third-party development model.

== Release ==
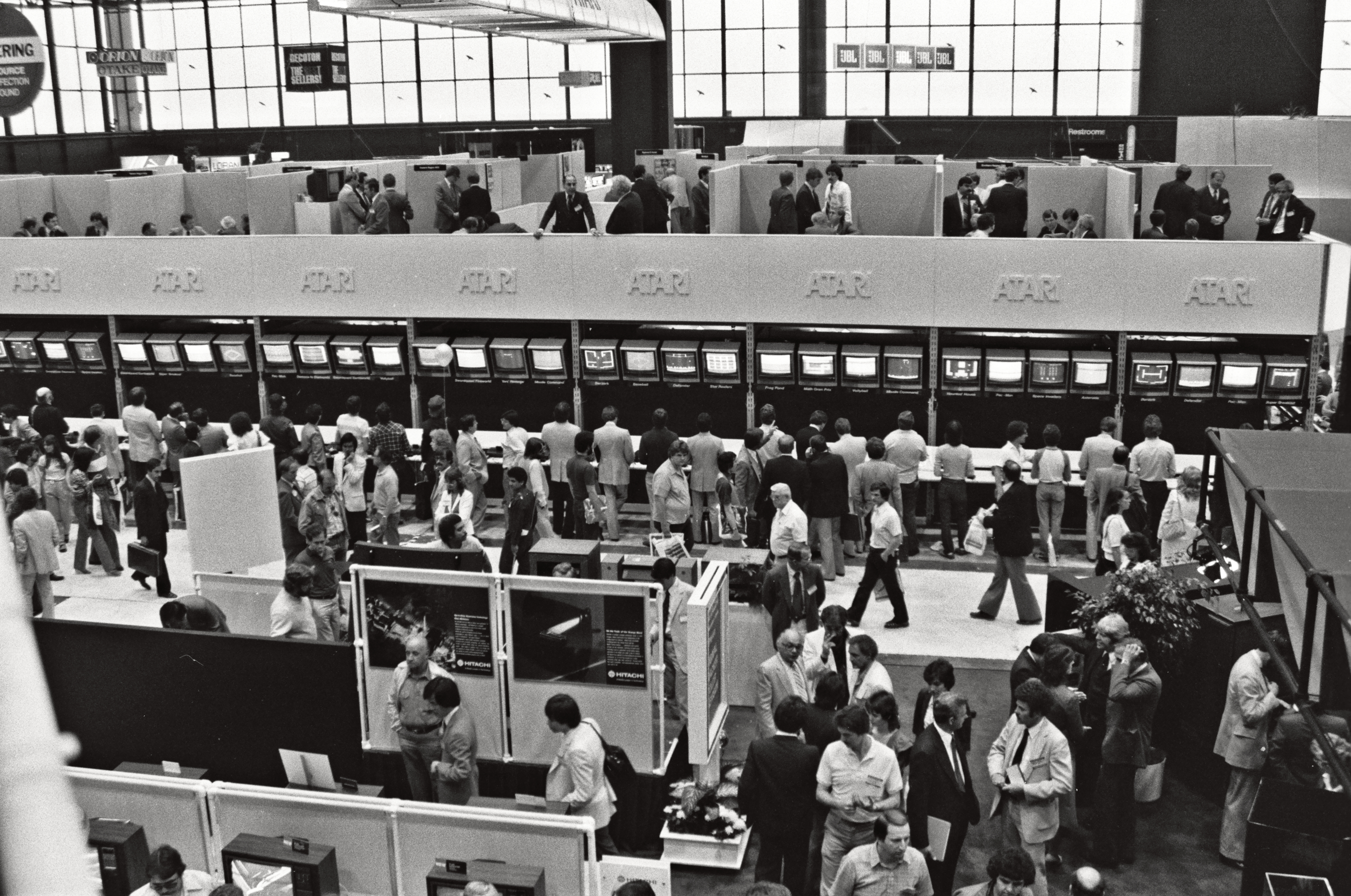
Atari had a presence at the 1982 Consumer Electronics Show, which was also where Venetian Blinds was privately displayed by Activision.

Venetian Blinds was not intended for public release and, aside from private displays of the game at the 1982 Consumer Electronics Show, was otherwise unknown to the public. The sunset technique used in Venetian Blinds was eventually reused in Activision's Barnstorming.

Venetian Blinds was first officially released to the public in late 2003, when it was included as part of the Windows, macOS, and Game Boy Advance ports of Activision Anthology. These ports include Crane's information on the game's background.

On January 2, 2005, Thomas Jentzsch and Matt Reichert released the binary for Venetian Blinds online as a free download through Atari fansite AtariAge. The release included an early prototype of Freeway titled Bloody Human Freeway, featuring a human character instead of the final game's chicken, and two prototypes for unnamed, unreleased games.

On December 22, 2010, Venetian Blinds was released through the Game Room service for Windows, the Xbox 360, and Windows Phone 7, as part of Game Pack 013. It was added to Xbox Game Pass’s Retro Classics collection at launch in May 2025.

== Reception ==
Bad Game Hall of Fame, in an article about Venetian Blinds, considered it "a stretch to even call it a 'game'", but noted its historical importance. The article also criticized its inclusion on Game Room, and highlighted Activision allowing it to be sold as a sign that the company "became the very soulless husk they sought to spite so long ago".

Tyler Treese of GameRevolution deemed Venetian Blinds "one of gaming's greatest moments of pettiness" and categorized it as a "diss game", commending its historical importance and rarity but calling its inclusion on Game Room "ridiculous".
