= Fairchild Channel F Videocarts =

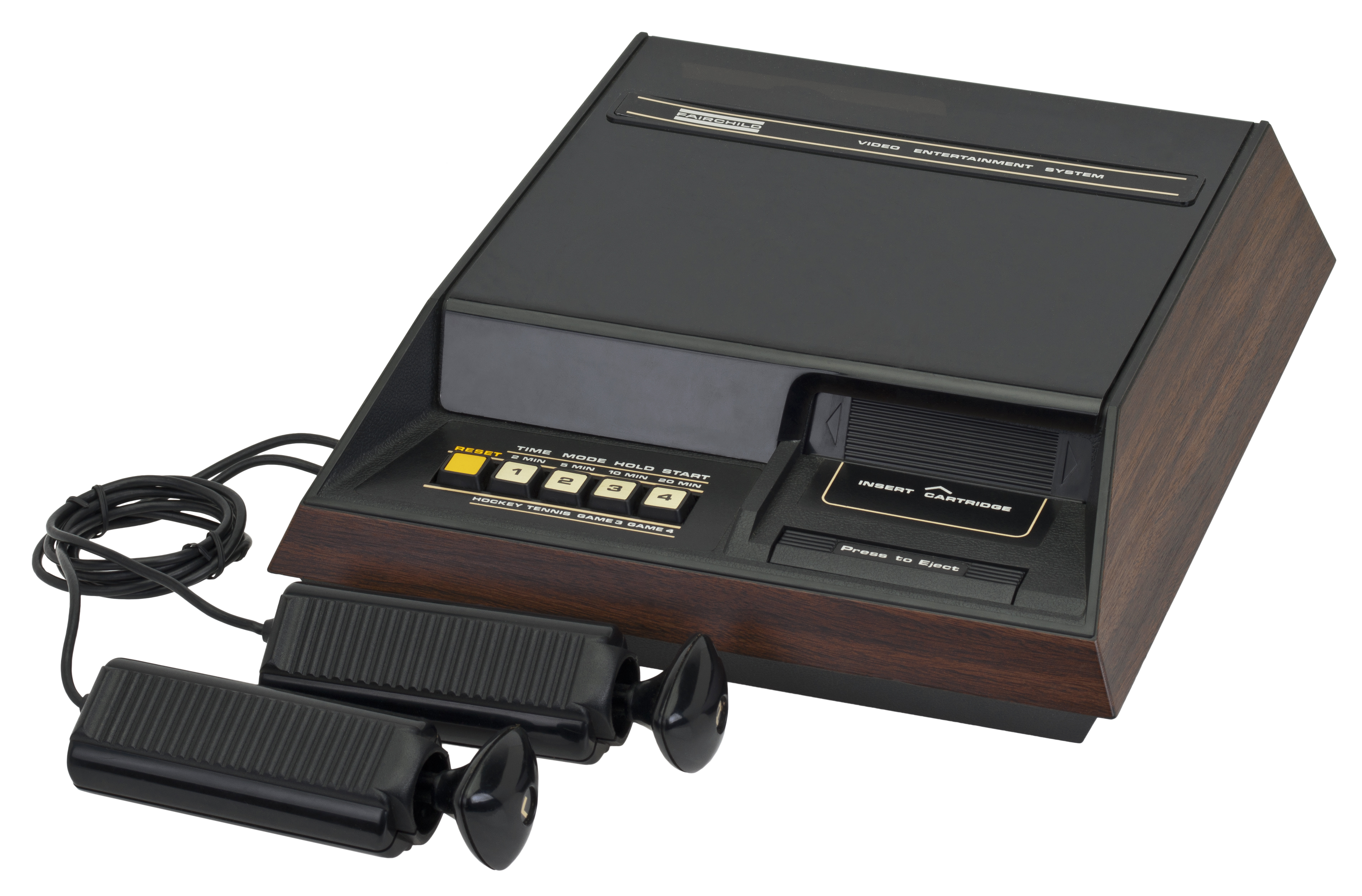
The Fairchild Channel F

The Fairchild Channel F is a home video game console released by Fairchild Camera and Instrument in November 1976. It has the distinction of being the first programmable ROM cartridge-based video game console, and the first console to use a microprocessor. It was launched as the Fairchild Video Entertainment System, or Fairchild VES for short, but when Atari released their Atari Video Computer System, Atari VCS, later Atari 2600 the next year, Fairchild renamed its machine.

Twenty-seven cartridges, termed 'Videocarts', were officially released to consumers during the ownership of Fairchild and Zircon, the first twenty-one of which were released by Fairchild. Several of these cartridges were capable of playing more than one game. The Videocarts were yellow and approximately the size and overall texture of an 8 track cartridge. They usually featured colorful label artwork. Industrial designer Nicholas F. Talesforce was responsible for the overall design of the cartridges, while early artwork was created by artist Tom Kamifuji. The console contained two built-in games, Tennis and Hockey, which were both advanced Pong clones. In Hockey the reflecting bar could be changed to diagonals by twisting the controller, and could move all over the playing field. Tennis was much like the original Pong. These games were reviewed by Video magazine in 1978 and Hockey received a score of 7 out of 10 while Tennis received a 6 out of 10.

A sales brochure from 1978 listed 'Keyboard Videocarts' for sale. The three shown were K-1 Casino Poker, K-2 Space Odyssey, and K-3 Pro-Football. These were intended to use the Keyboard accessory. All further brochures, released after Zircon took over Fairchild, never listed this accessory nor anything called a Keyboard Videocart.

One additional cartridge was released numbered Videocart-51 and titled 'Demo 1'. This Videocart was shown in a single sales brochure released shortly after Zircon acquired the company. It was never listed for sale after this single brochure used for the winter of 1979.

== Videocarts ==
=== Videocart-1: Tic-Tac-Toe / Shooting Gallery / Doodle / Quadradoodle ===
Videocart-1 released with the system in November 1976 by Fairchild. It contains four games: Tic-Tac-Toe, a rendition of the pen and paper game, Shooting Gallery, in which moving targets must be hit from one of ten fixed positions and angles, Doodle, an art program which lets players draw red, green, and blue lines, and Quadradoodle, in which the game generates its own kaleidoscopic images which can be manipulated by the player. For losing in Tic-Tac-Toe, players receive the message "YOU LOSE TURKEY". Video magazine reviewed the individual games in a 1978 article on the Channel F, scoring Tic-Tac-Toe a 5 out of 10, Shooting Gallery a 7 out of 10, Doodle a 4 out of 10, and Quadra-Doodle a 3 out of 10. Shooting Gallery was described as "challenging" and Doodle was characterized as "not really a game" and criticized for its difficulty of control. Brett Weiss called it "surprisingly versatile".

=== Videocart-2: Desert Fox / Shooting Gallery ===
Videocart-2 was released in December 1976 by Fairchild. It contains two games: Desert Fox, a competitive tank game similar to Atari's Combat, and Shooting Gallery which is identical to the game of the same name on Videocart-1. Video magazine reviewed the individual games in 1978, describing Desert Fox as "challenging" while scoring it an 8 out of 10, and rescoring Shooting Gallery as a 7 out of 10. Videogames Hardware Handbook said that Desert Fox was missing the full screen mazes of Tank, but thought it "made great use of the Farichild's unique controllers."

=== Videocart-3: Video Blackjack ===
Videocart 3 is a rendition of the card game blackjack released in December 1976 by Fairchild. Players start with a $500 pot and are not allowed to split pairs or take insurance. Video magazine reviewed the game in 1978, describing it as "adult entertainment" and scoring it a 10 out of 10. Brett Weiss called it "a pretty decent game of '21'" and applauded the clearly marked cards, but noted it had less options than Atari 2600's Blackjack. Videogames Hardware Handbook considered its presentation "impressive for 1976" and compared it favorably to Blackjack for the Atari 2600. They believed it was weighed down by "cryptic command options".

=== Videocart-4: Spitfire ===
Videocart-4: Spitfire is a one-on-one aerial dogfighting game released in April 1977 by Fairchild. The game uses a side-on perspective, where players pull back on the controller to ascend and push in on the controller to descend. In addition to a two-player mode, the game allows for one player to square off against a CPU, a unique feature for the time. If the player gets too far ahead in points, the CPU will become a more difficult opponent. Video magazine reviewed the game in 1978, scoring it a 6 out of 10 and describing it as "exciting" but noting that "sometimes it's hard to tell if your plane is flying upside down." The cartridge contains an Easter Egg displaying the programmers name (Michael K Glass), it's not possible to show it from an original cart as it lacks some of the needed functionality.

=== Videocart-5: Space War ===
Videocart-5: Space War is a competitive shoot 'em up released in April 1977 by Fairchild. Two players navigate space craft through an asteroid field attempting to shoot each other with lasers. Shooting and taking damage depletes energy which can be regenerated at star bases. Video magazine reviewed the game in 1978, scoring it a 9 out of 10 and describing it as "exciting" and "fast-moving" with "energetic sound effects". Video Games in 1983 unfavorably reviewed Space War, calling it perhaps "the most antiquated game of its type still on the market". Brett Weiss compared it to the 1962 mainframe game Spacewar! and Cinematronics' Space Wars.

=== Videocart-6: Math Quiz I (Addition & Subtraction) ===
Videocart-6: Math Quiz I (Addition & Subtraction) is a math education tool released in May 1977 by Fairchild. Players are given a limited number of addition and subtraction problems to complete. The manual also suggests players use a pencil and paper to play hangman and solve mazes to supplement to problem solving. Video magazine reviewed the individual games in 1978, scoring Math Quiz - Addition and Math Quiz - Subtraction a 2 out of 10 each. The games were criticized for exceptionally poor controls and handling. Brett Weiss considered it to be "barebones".

=== Videocart-7: Math Quiz II (Multiplication & Division) ===
Videocart-7: Math Quiz (Multiplication & Division) is a math education tool released in August 1977 by Fairchild. It is similar to Videocart-6 but replaces addition and subtraction problems with multiplication and division. Brett Weiss complained that both cartridges didn't contain enough problems, but complimented how the game showed players how to get the right answers after getting a question wrong.

=== Videocart-8: Magic Numbers ===
Videocart-8: Magic Numbers was released in September 1977 by Fairchild. It contains two games, Mind Reader and Nim. Mind Reader is similar to the board game Mastermind. Players have 20 guesses to correctly guess a number between two and five digits long. On each guess, the game gives player feedback about the correctness of each digit. Nim is based on the ancient game of nim. Players take turns removing any number of items from one of three stacks. The player that picks up the last item loses. Video magazine reviewed the individual games in 1978, scoring Mind Reader a 9 out of 10 and declining to award a score for Nim. Whereas Mind Reader was described as tricky but exciting (especially in "timing mode"), Nim was found be the reviewers to be incomprehensible. After "over an hour" of attempts to play and a telephone call to Fairchild, the reviewers gave up trying. Brett Weiss called the graphics "simplistic" but said it had "much in the way of brain-straining challenges."

=== Videocart 9: Drag Strip ===
Videocart 9: Drag Strip is a racing video game released in September 1977 by Fairchild. Players compete in a drag race, attempting to drive a car in a straight line faster than their opponent without blowing their engine up. Players are provided with a tachometer for measuring their engine's revolutions per minute and four gear speeds. Video magazine reviewed the game in 1978, scoring it a 5 out of 10 and criticizing its controls/handling and its low level of difficulty but noting that "the sound effects are fun".Video Games magazine in 1983 said it requires "the same deftness and touch" as Activision's Dragster. Brett Weiss in 2007 said it was "surprisingly intricate" but that the audio and visuals were "crude".

=== Videocart-10: Maze ===
Videocart-10: Maze is a collection of maze games released in November 1977 by Fairchild. Players play as mice trapped in a randomly generated maze. Players must escape the maze without getting captured by an enemy cat. Four different modes are included: Maze, Jailbreak, Blind-Man's-Bluff, and Trailblazer, which provide extra challenge including extra barriers and invisible maze layouts. Brett Weiss in 2007 compared to game favorably to Atari's Maze Craze.}

=== Videocart-11: Backgammon / Acey-Deucey ===
Videocart-11 is a video game based on the board games of backgammon and acey-deucey. It was released in December 1977 by Fairchild. Brett Weiss considered it a "fairly good" simulation of the two similar board games and more complete than the version for the APF-MP1000, despite "lousy graphics".

=== Videocart-12: Baseball ===
Videocart-12: Baseball is a sports video game released in September 1977 by Fairchild. It was one of the first console games based on baseball, and offered players a wide variety of pitching options, including fastballs, curve balls, and change-ups. Twisting the controllers steers the pitch, while pushing forward or pulling back varies its speed. If a batter manages to hit the pitch, four fielders can be moved to the left or right to make an out. Strikeouts, walks, and getting hit by the pitch are also included. The game was reviewed by Video magazine in 1978 where it received a score of 10 out of 10. Brett Weiss considered it "highly playable".

=== Videocart 13: Robot War / Torpedo Alley ===
Videocart 13 was released in January 1978 by Fairchild. It includes two games: Robot War, which is an action game where players attempt to lure four robots into force fields scattered about the screen, and Torpedo Alley, a shoot 'em up where players compete with each other as underwater turrets attempting to shoot down boats at the surface. Video Games in 1983 described Robot War as one of the best Channel F games, calling it "Berzerk without guns". Brett Weiss considered both to be "moderately entertaining".

=== Videocart-14: Sonar Search ===
Videocart-14: Sonar Search was released in May 1978 by Fairchild. It is very similar to the board game Battleship. Two players take turns guessing the location of and attempting to sink each of an opponent's five ships. Players select a spot on a grid and receive an audio signal depending on how how close the guess was.

=== Videocart-15: Memory Match ===
Videocart-15: Memory Match is a puzzle video game based on the card game concentration released in May 1978 by Fairchild. 40 cards appear on screen and players take turns flipping pairs of cards looking for potential matches. If a match is found, the two cards are removed. Otherwise, the cards are flipped back over allowing players to memorize their contents for future turns. Brett Weiss thought the interface worked well and the computer scoring was convenient.

=== Videocart-16: Dodge It ===
Videocart-16: Dodge It is a sports video game released in May 1978 by Fairchild. The game is similar to dodge ball. One or two players controls a character represented by a square in a room on the screen. A ball controlled by the computer is then introduced into the room - overtime increasing in numbers up to a maximum of nine. The objective is to not come in contact with the balls controlled by the computer. Upon hitting a ball, players receive a death screen where multicolored rectangles radiate out and absorb the player. Variables such as the size and speed of both the character and the ball as well as the size of the room, can be set by the player. Video Games in 1983 described Dodge-It as "...nightmarish and marvelous". Brett Weiss in 2007 described it as "semi-enjoyable" and "sort of the opposite of Pong."

=== Videocart-17: Pinball Challenge ===
Videocart-17: Pinball Challenge was released in April 1978 by Fairchild. Despite the name, it is a clone of Breakout. Players maneuver a paddle to rebound a ball into a wall of bricks. Bricks are destroyed on contact, and once every brick is destroyed the wall is replaced. Players can alter the speed of the ball, paddle sizes, and the visibility of bricks. Brett Weiss in 2007 thought "sluggish controls put a damper on the whole thing."

=== Videocart-18: Hangman ===
Videocart-18: Hangman was released in November 1978 by Fairchild. It is a rendition of the pen and paper game, hangman. Players guess the letters of an unknown word, with each successful guess filling in parts of the word and each unsuccessful guess filling in body parts of a man hanging from a noose. The game ends after six incorrect guesses. Players can provide up to 30 words of their own in addition to the 160 words included with the cartridge. Video Games in 1983 wrote, "Hangman has more variety than other video hangman games and a better visual display than most."

=== Videocart-19: Checkers ===
Videocart-19: Checkers was released in August 1980 by Zircon. It is based on the board game checkers. Players attempt to capture each of their opponents 12 pieces by hopping over them at diagonals. Only a one player mode against a CPU is included in this version. Brett Weiss in 2007 it recreated the basics of the board game well but that it had "overly simplistic graphics and annoying sound effects."

=== Videocart-20: Video Whizball ===
Videocart-20: Video Whizball is a video game released in November 1978 by Fairchild. The goal of the game is to score points against the opponent (either the computer or another player) by sending a large floater across the opponent's goal line. As many as four floaters can be pushed across the playing field by shooting whizballs at them from the players' paddles. Players may also strategically shoot whizballs at the opponent's paddle to cause a penalty freeze. The game contains an Easter egg displaying the programmer Bradley Reid-Selth's name as an object in the middle of the screen. It was given an Honorable Mention for "Best Pong Variant" in 1982 at the Third Annual Arcade Awards ("Arkies"), and it was reviewed in Video magazine's "Arcade Alley" column a month later where it was praised as "a real one-of-a-kind cartridge". The editors of "Arcade Alley" gave the game a full review in the first issue of Electronic Games, where they called it "astonishingly unique". George Sullivan considered it to be "loads of fun".

=== Videocart-21: Bowling ===
Videocart-21: Bowling is a bowling video game released in November 1978 by Fairchild. It is a top-down simulation of the sport, where players throw a bowling ball attempting to knock down ten pins. Players can throw the ball straight or curve the ball mid-roll. There is a mode where the computer sets up challenge shots for the player. Brett Weiss in 2007 called the graphics "very simplistic" but that the "vague impression" of bowling was there.

=== Videocart-22: Slot Machine ===
Videocart-22: Slot Machine is a slot machine video game released in August 1980 by Zircon. It features a slot machine that may be stopped in one of two ways. After setting the initial bet, the player may choose to either wait for a fixed period of time after which the reels come to a halt or to exert direct control by stopping each reel independently. The game was reviewed in Video magazine's "Arcade Alley" column in 1982 where its graphics were favorably described as "almost on par with [those of the] Intellivision". Brett Weiss in 2007 called it "one of the better looking Channel F titles."

=== Videocart-23: Galactic Space Wars / Lunar Lander ===
Videocart-23 was released in August 1980 by Zircon. It contains Galactic Space Wars, a first person space shoot 'em up, and Lunar Lander, similar to Atari's arcade game of the same name, where players are tasked with landing a space ship on a launching pad without crashing. Galactic Space Wars includes a two-player mode in which a second player can control the enemy ships.Video magazine reviewed the individual games in 1982, praising Galactic Space Wars' inventive horizontal and vertical alignment settings, but noting that the graphics are merely "acceptable" and "can't really compete" when compared against contemporary systems. Video's review of Lunar Lander was considerably more critical, describing it as "a near-total washout" and pointing to pale images and unwieldy controls as specific problems. As a whole the cartridge was described as "a good try" confounded by "primitive technology", and readers were advised to wait for Zircon's upcoming Space Invaders-esque game, Galactic Intruders (released in 1981 as Videocart-26: Alien Invasion).

=== Videocart-24: Pro-Football ===
Videocart-24: Pro-Football is an American football video game released in August 1980 by Zircon. This six on six rendition of the sport represents the offensive team as X's and the defensive team as squares. Each team has eight plays to choose from and four downs to get the ball into the endzone. Games last 16 minutes. Video Games considered the inclusion of the University of Notre Dame fight song and "On Wisconsin!" to be a "feeble attempt" to recreate the atmosphere of the sport. Electronic Games in 1981 thought the gameplay was decent.

=== Videocart-25: Casino Poker ===
Videocart-25: Casino Poker, later renamed to Casino Royale, was released in September 1981 by Zircon. It is based on five-card draw poker. One or two players compete against a CPU dealer to assemble the best set of five cards they can and win a prize pot. The dealer can employ a number of strategies including bluffing and holding kickers. Video Games praised Casino Royale in 1983, calling it "the best card game, from blackjack to bridge, made for any TV-game system" and a reason to buy the Channel F after its discontinuation. Brett Weiss in 2007 thought it was less visually exciting than Las Vegas Poker & Blackjack for the Intellivision but that it "got the job done."

=== Videocart-26: Alien Invasion ===
Videocart-26: Alien Invasion is a fixed shooter video game released in September 1981 by Zircon. It is very similar to Taito's Space Invaders and was the last cartridge designed for the Channel F during its lifetime. Many of the elements of Space Invaders are included, including the slowly descending aliens, the three barriers at the bottom of the screen, and a spaceship that flies overhead periodically for bonus points. A two player mode is included which allows two spaceships to compete for the most aliens shot simultaneously. Video Games called it an "amusing diversion" but also that it had "none of the excitement, frenzy or challenge" of Atari's version of Space Invaders. Brett Weiss called it "the most arcade-like game on the Channel F." The game contains an Easter Egg displaying the programmer Bradley Reid-Selth's name next to the player scores. Videogames Hardware Handbook highly recommended the game.

=== Videocart-51: Demonstration Cartridge ===
Democart: Demonstration cartridge contains an interactive demonstration program that teaches how to use the console and start a game of Hockey. It was released 1977 by Fairchild, Zircon made it available to the public through mail order in 1979. The cartridge contains an Easter Egg displaying the programmer Michael K. Glass's name.
