= Blackjack (Atari 2600 video game) =

1977 video game

- Cover art by Rick Guidice
- Developer(s): Atari, Inc.
- Publisher(s): Atari, Inc.
- Designer(s): Bob Whitehead
- Platform(s): Atari 2600
- Release: September 1977
- Genre(s): Digital tabletop game
- Mode(s): Single-player, multiplayer

Blackjack is a video game simulation of the card game blackjack. It was designed by Bob Whitehead for the Atari Video Computer System (later known as the Atari 2600). The game allows up to three players to play a variation of blackjack. All players are given 200 chips which they can use to bet 1 to 25 during each round. The game ends for a player when they either run out of chips or earns 1000 chips or more.

Computer simulations of blackjack have been developed since the 1950s with all the home video game consoles released in the 1970s having a variation of the game released for their system. Whitehead developed the game following his work on Star Ship (1977). He was responsible for specific development choices, such as controlling the game via the paddle controllers, and initially planned to include other card games on the cart.

On the game's release in September 1977, it was the most well received game of the system's launch titles by Video magazine. Blackjack was no longer promoted by Atari following the release of Whitehead's Casino in 1979, but still continued to sell in small amounts as late as 1989. Retrospective reviews were generally dismissive, with Brett Weiss and AllGame noting low-quality sound and graphics while Kevin Bunch in Atari Archive: Vol.1 1977-1978 found that the release of Casino made Blackjack a relatively superfluous game for the Atari 2600.

== Gameplay ==
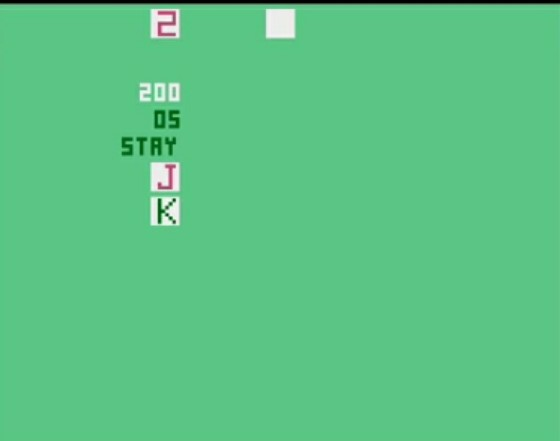
A single player game of Blackjack. The dealer's hand can be seen at the top of the screen while the players is seen below it.

Blackjack can be played by one to three players. All players start with 200 chips and can bet 1 to 25 chips each round. Each player is dealt two cards face-up, while the dealer is given two cards face down. Each card has a point value assigned. Number cards have their face value, such as a five card being worth five points. Face cards are worth ten points, and an ace can be either be 1 or 11 points. The object of each round is to get 21 points or as close to 21 points without exceeding it. If a player is satisfied with their hand dealt to them, they can choose to stay. If they want to add more points, they can request a hit and receive another card from the dealer. A player can continue to hit until they choose to stay or until they exceed 21 points and lose the round. The player wins the round if their hand has more points than the dealer's hand without exceeding 21 or if the dealer's hand exceeds 21 points. If the player wins with a "Blackjack" (an ace along with a face card or a 10 card), they earn one and a half times their bet. A player's bet is either added or subtracted from their total score depending on if they won or lost the round. The game ends when one player earns 1000 chips, thus "breaking the bank", or if the player has no remaining chips.

The difficulty switches on the Atari 2600 can affect the gameplay. If the left difficulty switch is set to position B, the dealer shuffles the deck after every hand. If set to position A, the computer shuffles after dealing 34 cards. If the right difficulty switch is set to A, the dealer must hit a soft 17 or less and will stay on a hard 17. If a player's hand equals 10 or 11 points, the player must double their bet before the first hit. On position B, the dealer will stay on 17 or more points, all ties default to a win for the dealer, and a player can win the game when they hit four times without going over 21 points.

== Development ==
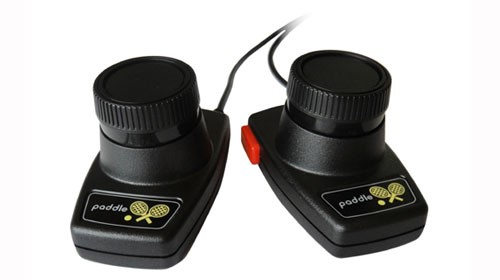
Developer Bob Whitehead chose to use the paddle controllers (pictured) in Blackjack to convince players that enough games used the unique controllers to justify their cost.

Blackjack was designed by Bob Whitehead. Whitehead was born in San Jose, California and graduated from San Jose University with a degree in computer mathematics. He joined the Atari, Inc. programming department in January 1977. Whitehead began work on Blackjack following Star Ship (1977), his adaptation of the arcade game Starship 1 (1977) for the Atari 2600. Various blackjack games had been made before the Atari 2600 version, such as Los Alamos engineers producing a version of the game for the IBM 701 in the 1950s. Most home video games consoles available in the late 1970s had a blackjack game, such as the Fairchild Channel F console with Videocart-3 in 1976.

Whitehead explained that developers for the system wanted to create games they thought they would enjoy themselves, believing a gambling-themed game would be appealing to the staff. He jokingly described them as "teenagers between the ages 18 and 35." Halfway through development, Whitehead contemplated adding other card games along with blackjack to the game, but held back on the idea as it was important at the time to release more games for the system. He specifically made the game to be controlled with the paddle controllers as he felt the game would be able to use them appropriately, and wanted owners of the system to feel that enough games used the controllers to justify their cost.

== Release and reception ==
Other than Combat, which was included with the Atari 2600 as a pack-in title, Blackjack was one of the initial eight launch titles that were shipped in September 1977. The cover art of Blackjack was done by Rick Guidice. Guidice was originally hired by Atari for his architectural design skills to create the entrance for their building. This led to contract work with Atari for illustrations he would make based on descriptions of the games. Guidice said that for Blackjack, he was given creative freedom from the Atari art directors to come up with image ideas and decided to illustrate playing cards and happy people in a casino setting. He would go on to make cover art for other early Atari titles, including Whitehead's Casino (1979). Blackjack was re-released in various compilation formats, such as the Atari 80 in One for Windows in 2003, the Atari Anthology for PlayStation 2 and Xbox in 2004, and Atari Greatest Hits: Volume 2 for Nintendo DS in 2011.

Video gave the game the highest ranking of the early releases for the Atari 2600, praising the several variations of the game and declaring it a "good game for adults", awarding it a 10 out of 10 rating. David H. Ahl of Creative Computing only gave the game a brief mention in their overview of the launch titles for the Atari 2600, categorizing them all as "games [that] are designed with many hours of fun in mind."

Retrospective reviews of Blackjack have been mostly negative. Author and video game enthusiast Ken Uston listed the game as among his least favourite from Atari in 1983. Michael Schwartz and Joan Dykman of AllGame dismissed the game, noting poor graphics, irritating audio, and specifying that the worst feature was its slow pace, concluding that "Blackjack is just not a fun video game, even by 1977 standards." Brett Weiss, in his book Classic Home Video Games 1972-1984 (2007), complimented how the control via the paddle allowed for nice, rapid play, while finding the graphics and sound "as primitive as possible", noting the lack of suits on the cards and the lack of certain gameplay elements of traditional blackjack, such as the ability to double down or split pairs. Kevin Bunch, in Atari Archive: Vol.1 1977-1978, found that while the release of Casino (1979) made Blackjack a relatively superfluous release in the Atari 2600 library, it "was not a bad rendition of the card game", noting the ease of use in the controller, as well as small touches like the sound effect of the dealer cutting the cards if the player gets through an entire deck.

== Legacy ==
Blackjack was the first game to rewrite copy graphics on the fly, which would make the Atari 2600 display graphics beyond what it was built to do. Whitehead explained that the Atari 2600 was initially only intended to have a certain amount of object images on the screen, but as the television scans down the screen, the program could move these objects around. This technique was used in several later games for the system to show six-character score ranges.

Whitehead's desire to make more card games available was later realized with his game Casino, released in March 1979, which included variants on stud poker and solitaire, in addition to blackjack. Following the release of Casino, Blackjack was no longer highlighted in promotional material from Atari and was discontinued by the January 1982 Consumers Electronic Show. The game stayed on the market, with some remaining small sales figures still appearing as late as 1989.

== See also ==
- List of Atari 2600 games
