= Pete Rose Baseball =

1988 video game

- Developer: Absolute Entertainment
- Publisher: Absolute Entertainment
- Designer: Alex DeMeo
- Platforms: Atari 2600, Atari 7800
- Release: Atari 2600: NA: December 1988; Atari 7800: NA: 1989
- Genre: Sports

Pete Rose Baseball is a baseball video game published by Absolute Entertainment in 1988 for the Atari 2600 and in 1989 for the Atari 7800.

== Gameplay ==
Pete Rose Baseball on the Atari 2600

The game features a "behind the pitcher" viewpoint for pitching and batting, a viewpoint which was introduced by the classic computer game Hardball. In addition, the game features different "bird's eye" views of the field depending on where the ball is hit; there are two infield views (one for each half of the infield) and three outfield views (left field, center field, and right field).

== Legacy ==
When the game was re-released by Activision (who bought Absolute's video game properties after Absolute folded in 1995) for inclusion in Activision Anthology, the game was renamed Baseball, due to the license deal with Pete Rose having expired.
