= Casino (video game) =

1978 video game

- Developer: Atari, Inc.
- Publishers: Atari, Inc.
- Designer: Bob Whitehead
- Platform: Atari 2600
- Release: March 1979
- Genre: Gambling
- Modes: Single-player, multiplayer

Casino is a collection of card games for the Atari Video Computer System programmed by Bob Whitehead and published by Atari, Inc. in 1979. Supporting up to four players, the game uses the paddle controllers.

== Gameplay ==
A blackjack game in progress

Displayed from an overhead perspective, there are three card games to choose from: blackjack, five-card stud poker, and poker solitaire. Except for poker solitaire, each game always has the computer as the dealer, and bets are made by rotating the wheel on the controller and then pressing the button.

There are two blackjack games: Game 1 allows for up to two players and hand splitting. Game 2 allows for up to four players, but without the hand splitting. There are variations in the game depending on the setting of the difficulty switches. If the left switch is set to "A", the computer will shuffle after 34 hands, and if set to "B", the computer will shuffle after every hand. If the right switch is set to "A", the dealer will stay (not draw anymore cards) after drawing a 17, and if set to "B", the computer will stay after drawing an 18 or better. Furthermore, the player will win if they draw the maximum number of cards; in Game 1, that is three or eight hits, and in Game 2, three hits.

Stud poker allows up to four players. The computer, as the dealer, issues a card to each of the players and itself. Before the first card is dealt, and after each subsequent hand, until five cards have been dealt, each player must either make a bet or fold. If the left difficulty switch is set to "A", the dealer's first card is dealt face down; otherwise, it is dealt face up; likewise for the right difficulty switch for each player.

Poker solitaire is different in that no bets are made and there is no dealer; rather, the goal is to arrange cards to create the best twelve poker hands in 25 cards, with five rows, five columns, and the two diagonals. Points are scored depending on the hands created, with a pair yielding 10 points and a royal flush yielding 500 points. The highest possible score is 3340 points.

== Release ==
Casino was released in March 1979.

The game was re-released in 2003 as part of the Atari - 80 Classic Games in One! collection for Microsoft Windows. It was also part of the 2004 Atari Anthology for the Xbox and PlayStation 2.

== See also ==
- List of Atari 2600 games
- Blackjack, another Atari 2600 card game
