= 4th & Inches =

1987 video game

- North American cover art
- Developers: Accolade (C64); Sculptured Software (ports)
- Publishers: NA: Accolade; EU: U.S. Gold
- Designer: Bob Whitehead
- Composer: Ed Bogas
- Platforms: Commodore 64, Amiga, Apple IIGS, MS-DOS, Classic Mac OS
- Release: 1987: C64; 1988: IIGS, Amiga, Mac, MS-DOS
- Genre: Sports (American football)
- Modes: Single-player, multiplayer

4th & Inches is an American football sports video game published in 1987 by Accolade for the Commodore 64. It was designed by Bob Whitehead. Conversions by Sculptured Software to the Apple IIGS, MS-DOS, Amiga, and Classic Mac OS were released in 1988. It was designed by Accolade co-founder, Bob Whitehead. An expansion pack, Team Construction Disk, was released in 1988.

== Description ==
Like other sports games by Bob Whitehead, 4th & Inches was hailed upon release, combining the action of previous titles with the new feature of strategic play calling. For the first time in a computer football game, players could choose from a number of plays. The player initially designated a formation and then selected one of five plays based on the formation. These plays included a great number of offensive strategies, including draws, curls, sweeps and long bombs, among others. Defensive tactics equally were varied, with the player being able to choose a defensive formation based on what they thought the opponent would attempt.

The game required the player to select a position to control before the play began while on offense, but was not able to switch control during the action. Because there was a limited area of the field in view at any one time, it occasionally prevented the player from seeing important parts of the play develop. Rather than scrolling smoothly when the player being controlled would reach the edge of the screen, as modern football simulations do, it re-drew the visible section of the field entirely, placing the controlled player in a new position on the screen. While on defense, the player being controlled could not be changed either but would be automatically selected as the player closest to the offensive ball carrier on each screen redraw.

4th & Inches followed another title for Accolade (also designed and programmed by Whitehead): HardBall!, a baseball game. Many of the graphics and several sound effects from that game were re-used in 4th & Inches.

== Development ==
The original version for the Commodore 64 (1987) was designed and programmed by Accolade co-founder, Bob Whitehead. Conversions by Sculptured Software to other systems followed in 1988. These versions were programmed by Craig Conder (Amiga), Tony Manso (Apple IIGS), and John Motter (MS-DOS).

== Reception ==
Computer Gaming World approved of 4th & Inches' combination of arcade action and playbook-based strategic play. It criticized the lack of league play or alternatives to the single available team, but concluded that the game was "a welcome addition to the genre". The Commodore 64 version of the game sold more than 50,000 copies.

=== Reviews ===
- Games #93
