= Antstream Arcade =

Cloud gaming service

- Developer: Antstream Ltd.
- Type: Cloud gaming service
- Launched: 2018
- Platforms: Microsoft Windows, macOS, Linux, Android, iOS, Amazon Fire TV, Atari VCS, PlayStation 4, PlayStation 5, Xbox One, Xbox Series X/S
- Website: antstream.com

Antstream Arcade is a cloud gaming service operated by British company Antsteam Ltd. The platform offers retro games from the 1970s to the 2020s.

== History ==
Steve Cottam founded Antstream in London in 2013 after recognizing the lack of access to many older video games, which were often only obtainable through video game piracy due to a lack of availability on modern platforms. Along with a friend, Cottam developed the company as a streaming service for retro games, starting in 2013.

By 2015, they had developed a prototype and got accepted into an accelerator fund with Microsoft and Ian Livingstone joined the company as chairman. In June 2019, the streaming service Antstream Arcade was officially launched. Also in 2019, Antstream received an investment from Chinese company Tencent and was able to establish itself on various platforms. Antstream received a further investment of US$3.5 million from Atari, with a total of over US$20 million invested in Antstream as of 2021.

In 2025, the platform achieved 3,200% growth in new players. In total, there were over 700,000 new players and over 200,000 active users per month. Also in 2025, over three million games were downloaded from the Antstream Arcade line-up. In May 2022, 27 games by the video game companies Namco and Bandai (which were merged under Bandai Namco Holdings in 2005) were licensed to Antstream Arcade, including Pac-Man, Galaga and Dig Dug.

== Content ==
According to IGN, Antstream Arcade is considered to be the "world's largest officially licensed retro gaming platform". It focuses on games from the 1970s, 1980s, 1990s, 2000s, 2010s and 2020s. The lineup consists of games for different consoles and home computers, including the Nintendo Entertainment System, Atari 2600 and the PlayStation, and from different gaming companies.

In his 2025 Eurogamer article, Ed Nightingale explains that new mini-games and challenges, like tournaments and high-score duels, can be added to the original games. The platform also offers online profiles, online high scores, cloud saves and resume play within the games. Furthermore, Antstream Arcade also contains new games for classic consoles by independent developers.

As of March 2025, the platform offers over 1,400 games, including Pac-Man, Pac-Mania, Baraduke, Galaga, Dig Dug, Pong, Asteroids, Centipede, Missile Command, Bubble Bobble, R-Type and Mr. Do!. Will Greenwald writes in PCMag, that the platform is interesting as a history lesson of gaming. He praises the large number of available games, while criticising the TV-oriented interface that cannot be operated with a PC mouse.

== Access and availability ==
Antstream Arcade runs via an internet connection. It operates on a subscription model, with monthly, yearly or lifetime options available.

The service is available on PC, Mac, Linux, Android, Android TV, Fire TV, Samsung TV, and in browsers. In July 2023, it became available for the Xbox One and Xbox Series X/S. Antstream was available on iOS through the App Store starting in June 2024. In September 2024, Antstream was also available on the PlayStation 4 and PlayStation 5.

In May 2025, a separate service, entitled Retro Classics, became available exclusively for the Xbox One, Xbox Series X/S and Xbox on PC, with support for streaming, for Xbox Game Pass members with over 80 titles from the Activision Blizzard library (Activision, Sierra Entertainment and Blizzard Entertainment), along with over 100 titles being planned to be available in the future.
