= Video Chess =

1979 video game

- Cover art by Cliff Spohn
- Developer: Atari, Inc.
- Publishers: Atari, Inc.
- Programmers: Bob Whitehead; Larry Wagner
- Platform: Atari 2600
- Release: November 1979
- Genre: Strategy
- Mode: Single-player

Video Chess is a 1979 strategy video game developed and published by Atari Inc. for the Atari 2600. It is a simulation of the board game chess, in which the goal is to lead an opponent into "checkmate" by moving pieces of differing movement ability. The player competes against a computer opponent of eight selectable skill levels and can choose whether to play a standard regulation game or to freely set the starting position of the pieces.

== Gameplay ==
A regulation game in progress

Video Chess is a strategy video game simulating the board game chess. The game is played from an overhead perspective against a computer opponent, with the player's goal to use their pieces to corner the opponent's "king" piece into "checkmate".

The player uses a cursor to select and move pieces, rather than using chess notation. If an attempted move is illegal, the move is blocked with a warning sound. If the right-most switch is set to A, the computer plays as white; setting it to B lets the player play as white. With the left switch, selecting A allows the board to be set as the player pleases, whereas selecting B sets up the board for a regulation chess game. Eight different difficulty levels have the computer-player take a variable amount of time to determine its moves, ranging from a few seconds to ten hours.

== Development ==
The box art of the first production run of the Atari 2600 features a chess piece, though Atari was not yet contemplating designing a chess game. A man from Florida supposedly sued Atari on the grounds a chess game was not available for the platform yet the box art suggested so. Video Chess programmer Bob Whitehead said he was not aware of such a lawsuit.

At first, the console's strict hardware limitations seemed to preclude it hosting a chess program. The console's Television Interface Adaptor chip can only display three sprites in each scanline, or six (such as in Space Invaders) with the right programming. The eight-piece-wide chess board exceeds this limitation. Whitehead developed a technique he called Venetian blinds, in which a sprite's horizontal position is alternated between two values at every scanline, while the hardware outputs video signal. This results in one sprite being displayed as two objects, each composed of horizontal stripes. This technique made it possible to display eight chess pieces in each row while using only four sprites.

Atari developed a bank switching ROM cartridge to allow Video Chess prototypes to exceed four kilobytes, the maximum without bank switching. The released version is 4KB at a time when most games were 2KB, and the bank switching technology from the prototype was later used for other Atari 2600 games. It was one of six games labeled as "Special Edition" on the box, and some speculate that this designation on these games refers to a combination of the 4KB ROM size and other factors.

== Reception ==
Video magazine praised it as "a reward for Atari owners" which even basic chess players "should find rewarding for many hours of enjoyment". The reviewers were surprised that the gameplay was limited to a single player, and noted the high retail price of US$40 (equivalent to $180 in 2025), but they praised the programming which prevents illegal moves, and which includes more advanced chess concepts like castling and en passant capturing which had not yet become standard in all chess video games.

=== 2025 renewed publicity ===
In June 2025, the game briefly returned to technology news headlines after a hobby experiment showed an Atari 2600 emulator running Video Chess defeating OpenAI's ChatGPT 4o in a casual blitz match. Tech outlets such as PC Gamer, PCMag, CNET, and The Register described the result as a humorous reminder that large language models are not specialized chess engines, contrasting the 1.19 MHz MOS 6507's alpha-beta search with ChatGPT's conversational heuristics.

== See also ==
- List of Atari 2600 games
- Video Checkers
