= Sky Jinks =

1982 video game

- Developer: Activision
- Publisher: Activision
- Programmer: Bob Whitehead
- Platform: Atari 2600
- Release: NA: 1982
- Genre: Racing
- Mode: Single-player

Sky Jinks is a vertically scrolling, air racing-themed video game developed by Bob Whitehead for the Atari 2600 and published by Activision in 1982.

== Gameplay ==
Sky Jinks on the Atari 2600

In Sky Jinks, the player pilots a low-flying Seversky XP-41 airplane through a time trial. To complete a game level, the player must bank around a prescribed number of pylons (left for blue and right for red). The XP-41 can bank left and right, as well as accelerate and decelerate. Flying into a pylon (which counts), tree, or hot air balloon slows down the plane.

The game has four courses: Polo Grounds, Aero Race, Love Field, and Speedy Meadows. There is also a pseudo-randomly-generated course called Thompson Tourney.

== Legacy ==
In the mid-1980s, social psychologist Roy Baumeister used the game in his psychological research into performance anxiety.

Activision anthologized Sky Jinks in the PlayStation title A Collection of Activision Classic Games for the Atari 2600 (1998) and in the multi-platform collection Activision Anthology (2002).

== See also ==
- List of Atari 2600 games
- List of Activision games: 1980–1999
- Skiing (1980), a similar skiing game written by Bob Whitehead for Activision
