= Oink! (video game) =

1982 video game

- Developer: Activision
- Publisher: Activision
- Designer: Mike Lorenzen
- Platform: Atari 2600
- Release: 1983
- Genre: Action
- Modes: Single-player, multiplayer

Oink! is an Atari 2600 video game designed by Mike Lorenzen and released by Activision in 1983. Oink! is inspired by the fairy tale "The Three Little Pigs" and casts the player as a pig defending his home from a wolf who wants to destroy it.

== Gameplay ==
Gameplay screenshot

Three pigs, each with their own house, find themselves being attacked by the nefarious Bigelow B. Wolf (B. B. Wolf, for short). The wolf tries to break through the three-layer-deep wall of the pigs' homes by blowing away pieces of the wall. Simultaneously, the pig must collect patches from the top of the screen and drop them into holes in the wall at the bottom, thus protecting the pig from the wolf's breath. If the pig gets hit by the wolf's breath, he will be stunned and start to fall out of the house. A life will be lost if the hole in the wall is large enough for the pig to fall through.

The wall in the first house is yellow, representing the straw used to build the first little pig's house. Similarly, the wall in the second house is brown, as the second little pig's house was made of sticks, and the wall in the final house is red, since the third pig's house was made of bricks.

The player scores four points for each patch applied to the wall. When all the patches are used, a new row of patches appears, and the wolf's attacks speed up. Each time a new row appears, the point value for the patches multiplies. For example, each patch from the third row would be worth twelve points.

Oink! has a total of three gameplay variations. The first game is for one player, and the remaining two are for two players. The second game has the two players alternating playing the role of the pigs. In the third game, one player plays the pigs while the other player controls the wolf. When the wolf is successful in catching a pig, the roles alternate, such that both players assume each role three times. In this variation, the player can only score points when playing as the pigs.

=== Patch ===
During the game's original release, players who scored over 25,000 points could photograph their scores on their TV screens and send the pictures to Activision in exchange for an "Oinkers" patch.

== Reception ==
Oink! received the "Most Humorous Video Game/Computer Game" award at the 5th annual Arkie Awards in 1984.

== Legacy ==
Oink! is included in the Activision Anthology collection.

== See also ==
- List of Activision games: 1980–1999
