= Private Eye (1984 video game) =

1983 video game

- Developer: Activision
- Publisher: Activision
- Designer: Bob Whitehead
- Platform: Atari 2600
- Release: NA: February 1984
- Genre: Action
- Mode: Single-player

Private Eye is an action video game developed and published by Activision and released in 1984 for the Atari 2600 video game system. Designed by Bob Whitehead, who also wrote Chopper Command, Private Eye requires players to track down clues and recover items stolen by a master criminal, ultimately leading to his capture and arrest.

During the game's original release, players who successfully completed the game's third case could photograph their scores on their TV screens and send the pictures to Activision in exchange for a "Super Sleuth" patch.

== Gameplay ==
Private Eye on the Atari 2600

In Private Eye, players assume the role of Pierre Touché, a private investigator who has been assigned the task of capturing the criminal mastermind, Henri Le Fiend. Le Fiend is implicated in a number of crimes across the city, and the player must find the clues and the stolen property in order to successfully arrest Le Fiend.

The game consists of four separate cases. Using a specially-built Model A that can jump over obstacles, players must search the city for a specific clue to the crime and for the object stolen in the crime. Each item must then be returned to its point of origin; the clue is taken to a business to verify it came from there, and the stolen object is returned to its rightful owner. These items may be discovered in any order, but players may carry only one item at a time. When both items have been located and returned, then the player must locate and capture Le Fiend, and finally take him to jail, successfully closing the case.

However, the city is full of street thugs who will attack the player. If the player is hit while carrying an item (either the clue or the stolen property), the item is lost and must be re-located. Further, each case has a statute of limitations, which serves as the game's time limit of 2, 3, 4, 5, 10, 12, 20, and 25 minutes. To win the game, the player must locate and verify the clue, locate and return the stolen property, and lastly locate Le Fiend and take him to jail within the time allotted.

The player starts with 1000 "merit points.” Points are lost whenever the player hits an obstacle or is attacked by a thug, and are awarded whenever an item is located, subsequently returned, and when a thug (or Le Fiend himself) is nabbed. Each case represents a separate game variation, when the case is solved or time runs out, the game ends. A fifth variation requires the player to solve all four crimes at the same time.

== Legacy ==
Private Eye was included as part of the Activision Anthology collection, released in 2002 for PlayStation 2, Game Boy Advance, and other systems.
