= Crackpots =

1983 video game

- Developer: Activision
- Publisher: Activision
- Designer: Dan Kitchen
- Platform: Atari 2600
- Release: May 16, 1983
- Genre: Fixed shooter
- Modes: Single-player, multiplayer

Gameplay of Crackpots

Crackpots is an Atari 2600 game designed by Dan Kitchen and published by Activision in 1983. It was Kitchen's first game for Activision.

In Crackpots, the player controls Potsy, a gardener. Potsy's Brooklyn building is being overrun by bugs trying to climb inside six windows. The player moves Potsy back and forth along the roof to drop pots on the bugs before they can get close enough to enter the windows.

== Gameplay ==
Each level consists of four waves of twelve bugs each; defeat all four waves and the player will move on to a more difficult and faster-paced level. Play then resumes until the building crumbles to the ground. If six or more bugs enter through the open windows, part of the building will be eaten away, and you will have to replay the level. The patterns vary for different colored bugs. Black bugs will move straight up the building, blue bugs wiggle from left to right, red bugs move diagonally, and green bugs zig-zag between windows.

== Development ==
Crackpots was developed by Dan Kitchen. Before joining Activision, Kitchen worked on handheld electronic games, including Wildfire, which was released in the United Kingdom by Palitoy. He and his brother Garry Kitchen were interested in moving into console game development and attended the Consumer Electronics Show in January 1982. After being approached by both Atari and Activision, they chose to work with Activision.

Kitchen was one of five new programmers hired for Activision's East Coast office. He learned Atari 2600 programming with help from Garry, who had reverse-engineered the console and built a development board that could be connected to an Apple II. After working on text-adventure games such as Crime Stopper, Kitchen began developing a flowerpot-based game called Flower Power, which eventually became Crackpots. The idea developed while Kitchen was having lunch with Garry and David Crane in Glen Rock, New Jersey, after he noticed activity at a construction site across the street. It was his first Atari 2600 game.

The game was programmed using an Apple II connected to a PDP-11 development system. Kitchen originally wanted the game's enemies to be called arachnids, but Activision's marketing staff renamed them sewer bugs. He later recalled that Activision followed a "no flickering" rule, which led him to spend weeks correcting even minor graphical problems.

== Release ==
The video game was released during the video game crash of 1983. Dan recalled that the Crackpots "hit the shelves for $30 when games were selling for $2 so I don't think it had a chance." Dan planned to follow-up the game with a sequel to his brother's game Keystone Kapers (1983), with the game being in a Western-setting. In 2018, Dan found the only surviving copy of the unfinished game in a storage unit and planned to release it under the title Gold Rush.

== Reception ==
A review in the November 1983 issue of Videogaming and Computer Gaming Illustrated stated, "I think Activision has finally reached the point of saturation with the Kaboom! theme of having to catch or toss objects," but still gave the game a letter grade of B.

In a retrospective look, the Video Game Critic gave a letter grade of C: "It's a shame Crackpots only has one skill level because once you get the hang of it, the game tends to run long. Still, sharp graphics and thoughtful gameplay make this one worth a look."

== Legacy ==
Crackpots was included in the compilation packages Activision Classics (1998) for the PlayStation and the Activision Anthology (2002) for the PlayStation 2.

Dan would list Crackpots as one of his favourite projects in an interview with Retro Gamer published in 2020, stating that playing it "brings me back to those early days, which were the best times of my career."

== See also ==
- List of Atari 2600 games
- List of Activision games: 1980–1999
