= Bob Whitehead =

American video game designer and programmer

Robert A. Whitehead (born November 1, 1953) is an American video game designer and programmer. While working for Atari, Inc. he wrote two of the nine Atari Video Computer System launch titles: Blackjack and Star Ship. After leaving Atari, he cofounded third party video game developer Activision, then Accolade. He left the video game industry in the mid-1980s.

== Career ==
Whitehead attended San Jose State University and received a BS in Mathematics.

Whitehead worked for Atari, Inc. in the late 1970s developing games for the Video Computer System (later renamed to the Atari 2600). He developed several games, including a VCS implementation of chess, a feat many other programmers considered impossible for the system. He and his co-workers David Crane, Larry Kaplan, and Alan Miller became informally known as the "Gang of Four", a group of developers who felt inadequately compensated for their work despite being collectively responsible for 60 percent of the company's profits from VCS cartridge sales.

Whitehead is sometimes credited as co-author, together with the rest of the Gang of Four, of the operating system for the Atari 400/800 computers. (Note: Examples include the OS source code comments, David Crane, and Atari 400/800 system designer Joe Decuir.) It has been however clarified both by Al Miller and by Whitehead himself that he was not involved in the OS development, although he took part in developing applications for the computers.

Eventually the Gang of Four, disgruntled by the management's decline to provide more recognition and fair compensation to the developers, decided to leave Atari and start their own business. Whitehead together with Miller, Crane and Kaplan co-founded Activision, the first third-party video game developer, in October 1979.

There, with others, he created a VCS development system with an integrated debugger and minicomputer-hosted assembler. It was used for most of Activision's VCS titles. He also developed a "venetian blinds" animation technique: an algorithm that horizontally reused and vertically interlaced sprites several times while rendering each frame, to give the illusion that the system had more than the maximum number of sprites allowed by the hardware.

In 1984, he and other founders of Activision became disillusioned with their company. Their stock had dwindled in value and morale was low. They thought that diversification to the home computer market—such as with the Commodore 64—was the key to success. He left Activision with Alan Miller (another co-founder of Activision), and they founded Accolade. Soon after, Whitehead left the video game industry for good.

Whitehead left in order to "give back to God and spend time with 'the fam'". After leaving Accolade, Whitehead says he helped with "low income families, getting non-profit religious start-ups going, [and] spending time in the garden."

In a 2005 interview, Whitehead said of the contemporary state of the industry:

Too dark and derivative for my taste. The console and computer gaming business is too narrowly defined by the 14 [year old] male mentality and all his not-so-honorable fantasies. It's being driven by what has worked and afraid of what a 10 million dollar development bust will entail. It has lost its moral compass.

== Games ==
=== Atari 2600 ===
- Home Run (Atari)
- Football (Atari)
- Blackjack (Atari)
- Casino (Atari)
- Star Ship (Atari)
- Video Chess (Atari)
- Boxing (Activision)
- Stampede (Activision)
- Chopper Command (Activision)
- Private Eye (Activision)
- Skiing (Activision)
- Sky Jinks (Activision)
- Venetian Blinds (Activision)

=== Commodore 64 ===
- 4th & Inches (Accolade)
- HardBall! (Accolade)
