= Dolphin (video game) =

1983 video game

- Developer(s): Activision
- Publisher(s): Activision
- Programmer(s): Matthew Hubbard
- Platform(s): Atari 2600
- Release: May 1983
- Genre(s): Action
- Mode(s): Single-player

Dolphin is a side-scrolling video game created by Matthew Hubbard for the Atari 2600 and released by Activision in 1983. Dolphin requires the player to use audio cues in order to survive.

== Gameplay ==
Gameplay screenshot

The player controls a dolphin attempting to flee from a giant squid. It must avoid colliding with packs of seahorses while navigating both forward- and backward-moving currents (indicated by arrows pointed with or against the dolphin's direction, respectively) that accelerate or decelerate its speed. Occasionally, a seagull appears above the water's surface which, if touched, permits the player a short period of invincibility. During this time, the dolphin is able to touch the squid and drive it away.

The dolphin's sonar sounds to indicate how to avoid seahorses: a high pitch indicates an opening near the water's surface, and a lower resonance indicates a seafloor passage.

== Development ==
Dolphin was designed by Matthew Hubbard. Hubbard started in the video game industry working for Atari in 1980 and joined Activision in 1982. As a child, Hubbard was fascinated by animals, particularly whales and dolphins. He recalled that when he first started at Activision, he began animating a dolphin and asked the staff if they could recognize what it was.

Hubbard wanted to use a dolphin's ability of Animal echolocation to audibly give clues on where the player had to go next. Hubbard also had the game feature much larger characters than a typical Atari 2600 game. To achieve this effect in game, Hubbard was assisted by Bob Whitehead.

== Release ==
Dolphin was announced in January 1983 and was set to be shipped in April and be available in retail stores in May 1983. Dolphin was released in May 1983. By June, it was the fifth best selling video game of the month.

Dolphin has been re-released in various compilation packs, including the Atari 2600 Action Pack 2 for IBM-compatible PCs, and Activision Anthology (2002).

== Reception ==
The Video Game Update gave the game a positive review, stating that the graphics of the game were up to Activision's high standards noting the realistic dolphin swimming movements while finding the seagull unimpressive. The review concluded that Dolphin was "fascinating, although fans of heavy video action may find it a bit too cerebral. There is plenty of action - and suspense - in this game, but the aquatic setting gives it something of a languid feeling at the same time." Dan Persons of Video Games magazine made similar statements, describing the game as "graphically stunning" and "instead of creating another aquatic rehash of Defender, Activision has created a chase game that cleverly incorporates sound as an active element of play."

Dolphin won the "Best Videogame Audio/Visual Effects (Less than 16K ROM)" category in the Electronic Games 1984 Arcade Awards. From retrospective reviews, Brett Weiss in this book Classic Home Video Games 1972-1984 (2007) found that fans of games like Seaquest might miss shooting action, but overall described the game as innovative and most players will find it to be a satisfying experience.

== See also ==
- List of Atari 2600 games
- List of Activision games: 1980–1999
