= Star Ship =

1977 video game

- Developer: Atari, Inc.
- Publishers: Atari, Inc.
- Programmer: Bob Whitehead
- Platform: Atari 2600
- Release: September 1977
- Genre: Space combat simulator
- Modes: Single-player, multiplayer

Star Ship is a first-person space combat simulator video game designed by Bob Whitehead and published by Atari, Inc. as a launch title for the Atari Video Computer System (Atari VCS). The game has the player in a first-person perspective of a space ship, where can play a few variations of games that either involve shooting enemy space objects while avoiding asteroids, aiming at a second ship controlled by a player, trying to travel as fast through space within a time limit, or have a lunar lander craft land on a moon that is actively trying to avoid the player.

The game was Whitehead's first game for the system after being hired in January 1977. The game was based on the Atari arcade game Starship 1 (1977) as Whitehead was encouraged to make games that were adaptations of Atari's arcade line-up. The game received middling reviews from Video and Creative Computing. Atari officially stopped releasing the game in mid-1980.

== Gameplay ==
Star Ship on Atari 2600

Star Ship is from the view point of a star ship cockpit as it travels through space. The goal of the game is to destroy enemy space objects with a laser beam when they are within the target area to score points within a set amount of time. These space objects include a star fighter worth one point, and a space robot worth three points. If the player's ship collides with these space objects or the undestroyable asteroids scattered through space, they lose one point.

In single-player mode, the game lasts two minutes and sixteen seconds. The game's difficulty settings can be adjusted to allow for either one or two space objects to appear at a time and adjust whether they move at a slow or fast pace. In two-player mode, the game lasts four minutes and thirty-two seconds. In this game, the players take turns as the Star Ship Commander and the Module Commander. The former chases the module through space and earns points by shooting it successfully or when the Module Commander collides with enemy space objects. As the Module Commander, the player avoids the lasers from the star ship and has the ability to become invisible when close to the crosshairs of the Star Shop Commander. The Star Ship Commander can also earn points if the Module Commander colliders with space objects or asteroids. This two-player mode also has varied difficulty setting, allowing for no space objects, or including them with various slow and fast speeds of the asteroids and enemy space objects. A timer is set-up in this mode that has the players swap rolls when it finishes counting down. After a second timer counts down, the game ends.

A single player mode called "Warp Drive" is available where the players tries to travel as far as they can in space while avoiding asteroids. As a timer countdowns the parsecs, the player can opt to go into warp drive by pushing a button to move faster. The game has two modes which adjust the amount of asteroids that appear.

The final mode is Lunar Lander, which has the player control a Lunar Lander to reach a moon's surface. In single-player mode, the moon is controlled by the computer, while in a two-player mode, a second player can control the moon, with the goal of having it avoid contact with the Lunar Lander. This mode is also manipulated in difficulty by having no meteor showers, or allowing for fast and slow meteor showers that that cause the player controlling the lander to lose points if they connect with them.

== Development ==
Star Ship's lead designer was Bob Whitehead who joined Atari's programming department in January 1977. The game was his first game developed for the Atari Video Game System. While no project was officially assigned to him, he was encouraged by the company to adapt existing titles to the console. Prior to the release of Star Ship, Atari had developed an arcade game titled Starship 1 which released in August 1977. Whitehead was interested in the 3D perspective of the arcade game and found that outer space themed games were popular at the time, he attempted to adapt the in development arcade game to the console.

Whitehead said that both the "Lunar Lander" and "Warp Drive" games were variations on Starship 1 theme which worked well within the kernel he had developed for the main game as it allowed for some elements to be reused without requiring a lot of new code. Star Ship may have gone through a name change while in development as early press material and advertisements refer to it as Space Mission.

== Release ==
Star Ship was released for the Atari VCS in September 1977. The game was among the nine launch titles for the console, but was not immediately available as the earliest Atari games other than Combat (1977) were initially only obtainable by mail order. For the Sears release of the Atari VCS under their Tele-Games label, the game was titled Outer Space. Atari continued to sell the game for a few years before discontinuing it around June 1980.

Star Ship was re-released in video game compilation formats, such as the Atari: 80 Classic Games in One! (2003) for Windows and the Atari Anthology (2004) for PlayStation 2 and Xbox. It was also released on portable devices as part of the Atari Greatest Hits release for the Nintendo DS and iOS.

== Reception ==
Reception

Review scores
Publication	Score
Allgame	1.5/5
The Complete Guide to Electronic Games	1/5
Video	4/10

From contemporary reviews, David H. Ahl wrote in Creative Computing that the sound effects in Starship "added a great deal" to the game's overall quality. In his overview of the system, Ahl did not list it in his discussion of games he recommended for the system, which only included Video Olympics, Surround, Outlaw (1978), and Breakout while stating all the games for the system "are designed with many hours of fun in mind." An anonymous reviewer in Video magazine complimented that the game looked nice but that the game was "hard to get a handle on."

From retrospective reviews, In his book The Complete Guide to Electronic Games (1981), Howard J. Blumenthal wrote that while the gameplay was simple, it was a very hard game due to the inaccuracy of the target area. Brad Cook of AllGame found that Star Ship "isn't very good, even by late '70s standards" finding the two-player mode did not work due to the first-person perspective and that the sound effects were inappropriate for a space-themed game while the graphics were not bad with the exception of the bug-like space robots and the asteroids that resemble explosions. Kevin Bunch, in his book Atari Archive: Vol.1 1977-1978 (2023) described the game as a "middling entry" among the early Atari VCS titles finding that none of the game modes are bad, but that none of them particularly stood out. Both Blumenthal and Bunch wrote that the game paled in comparison to the similarly themed Star Raiders (1980) for the Atari 8-bit computers.

== Legacy ==
Whitehead later referred to the game as being "clunky" and that he said it was ambitious to attempt a 3D game on the system, but he was up for the challenge as "the more impossible it seemed, the more it seemed to motivate me. It was tricky [...] I'm not sure if I completely pulled it off to satisfaction, but I think it turned out pretty good for basically my first game."

Other developers for early programmable consoles built-on the first-person perspective and outer space-themed elements of both Star Ship and Star Raiders. These include Activision's Starmaster (1982), Starpath's Phaser Patrol (1982), and Imagic's Star Voyager (1982), with Bunch stating the latter skewed far closer to Star Ship's gameplay.

== See also ==
- 1977 in video games
- List of Atari, Inc. games (1972–1984)
