= Freeway (video game) =

1981 video game

- Developer: Activision
- Publisher: Activision
- Designer: David Crane
- Platform: Atari 2600
- Release: July 1981
- Genre: Action
- Modes: Single-player, multiplayer

Freeway is an action video game written by David Crane for the Atari 2600 and published by Activision in 1981. In the game, one or two players control chickens who cross a ten-lane highway filled with traffic. The goal is to set a high score in an allotted time. Every time a chicken gets across, a point is earned for that player. Depending on the difficulty mode, a chicken is forced back a lane or sent to the bottom of the screen when hit by a vehicle.

Freeway was a new game developed by Crane for Activision, which had begun releasing games independently in 1980. Crane stated the game was inspired by an incident involving Activision staff witnessing someone crossing Lake Shore Drive in Chicago. Crane's game initially involved a human being crossing the game, and was changed shortly before release to being a chicken.

Critics from Electronic Games praised the game on its release, with the publication giving the game an Honorable Mention for "Most Innovative Game" in 1982 at the Third Annual Arcade Awards. Other reviews compared it to the arcade game Frogger (1981) which was released around the same time.

== Gameplay ==
Gameplay in Freeway. Each player controls a chicken with the score for each player listed at the top of the screen.

Freeway is an action game where the player guides a chicken across ten lanes of a freeway while avoiding traffic. It can be played in single player or two players simultaneously, with each person controlling a chicken. Each player can control their chicken moving up and down the screen. Each time the player moves their chicken across the freeway, they are awarded one point. Each game lasts two minutes and sixteen seconds and the player with the highest score is the winner.

If the difficulty switch is set to the A position on the system, the chicken returns to the curb when hit by a vehicle. If set to B, the chicken is only knocked back one lane. Using the selection switch, the player can change the game level based on freeways across the United States such as Lake Shore Drive in Chicago at 3:00 am, Long Island Expressway in New York City at 3:00 am and Bayshore Freeway in San Francisco at midnight. The eight gameplay modes vary the speed of the vehicles and the amount of traffic on the roads.

== Development ==
Freeway was developed by David Crane for Activision. Following disputes with the company Atari, Inc. over pay, several programmers including Crane left the company to form Activision. In their first year, the company released four games, including two developed by Crane: Dragster (1980) and Fishing Derby (1980).

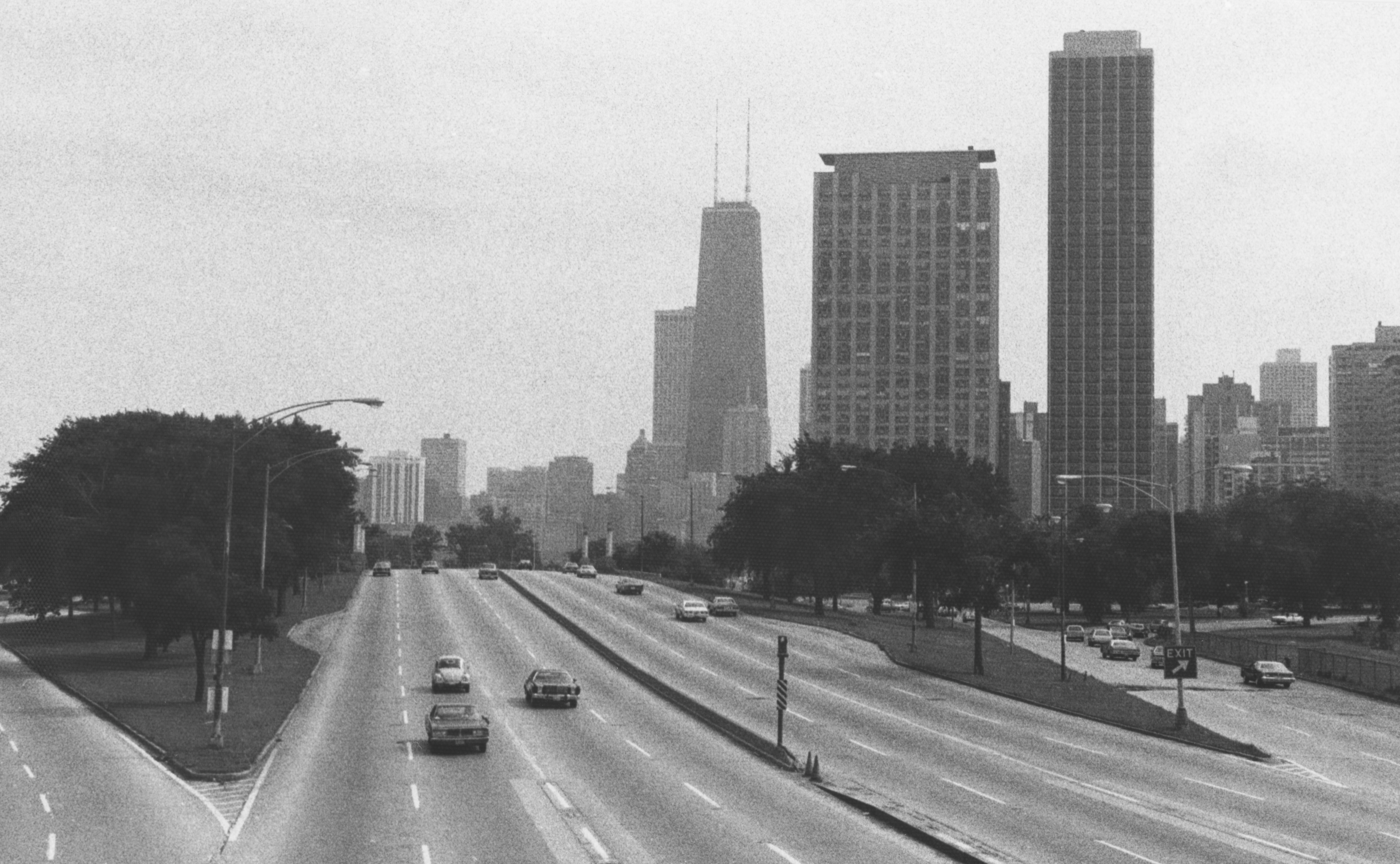
Lake Shore Drive in the late 1970s. Developer David Crane was inspired by incidents on the road for Freeway (1981).

Crane has given a few variations of a story that gave inspiration for Freeway. One variation published in 1981 involved Crane and his friends attempting to cross Chicago's busiest thoroughfare after exiting the wrong end of a building. When attempting to cross, one of his friends joked that this would make a great video game. Game designer Larry Kaplan would later be riding a bus and witnessed someone attempting to cross Lake Shore Drive. Kaplan would discuss the incident to Crane, which cemented the idea of developing it into a video game. In an interview with Retro Gamer published in 2011, Crane had a variation of the story that the game came from an experience at the Consumer Electronics Show (CES) in Chicago. Crane said he spotted someone parking a mile from the convention center who scaled a fence and dodged several lanes of traffic on Lake Shore Drive, including a bus that Crane was riding in. Crane began developing the game shortly after basing it on the gameplay of the arcade game Space Race (1973).

Crane's game initially had two men competing to move from the bottom of the screen to the top as many times as possible in two minutes. Three days before the next CES show, Activision's CEO Jim Levy suggested to change the characters in the game into a chicken as he could market it with someone wearing a chicken suit at the convention center and that it would fit a theme of the "Why did the chicken cross the road?" joke. The chicken costume in question was initially going to be the San Diego Padres' San Diego Chicken until plans fell through to use the mascot.

Freeway is often compared to the arcade game Frogger (1981). When asked which idea was developed first, Crane responded "The simple answer is neither. These two games were developed in secure laboratories 6,000 miles apart, right around the same time."

== Release and promotion ==
Along with Kaboom! (1981), Freeway was published by Activision and shipped in July 1981.

In Electronic Games magazine, an anonymous reviewer praised the game for its originality, stating that "While most home video games are either re-workings of classic themes or translations of coin-operated winners. Freeway stands out as wonderfully, joyously original. Nothing else is quite like it." Another article in the publication attributed this as Activision's house style: unorthodox themes with cartoon-styled animation, specifically highlighting Fishing Derby and Freeway as examples.

Along with Asteroids, Freeway received an Honorable Mention for "Most Innovative Game" in 1982 at the Third Annual Arcade Awards. It lost to Quest for the Rings (1981) for the Magnavox Odyssey 2. Critics Bill Kunkel and Arnie Katz commented that Freeway was refreshing when so many new titles were just refinements of existing hits. In the December 1983 issue of Videogaming and Computer Gaming Illustrated, the staff writers stated that outside games developed for the Starpath Supercharger add-on, the best five games for the Atari 2600 were Adventure (1980), Kaboom! (1981) and Freeway, saying the latter game was "far more exciting and involving than Frogger." From retrospective reviews, Brett Alan Weiss of AllGame complimented that outside the chicken who he felt looked "a bit sickly", the graphics in Freeway were "crisp and clear" and noted the realistic sound design with the sound of a din of engines and horn sound effects. Weiss found the game enjoyable, particularly in the two-player mode, but said it was a less versatile game than Frogger with less obstacles to avoid and the lack of ability to move horizontally or jump.

== See also ==
- List of Atari 2600 games
- List of Activision games: 1980–1999
