= Starship 1 =

1977 video game

- North American arcade flyer
- Developer: Atari, Inc.
- Publishers: NA/EU: Atari, Inc.; JP: Namco
- Designers: Ron Milner; Steve Mayer; Dave Shepperd; Dennis Koble
- Platform: Arcade
- Release: NA: July 1977; EU: 1977; JP: June 1978
- Genres: First-person shooter, space combat
- Mode: Single-player

Starship 1 is a first-person shooter space combat game developed and manufactured for arcades in 1977 by Atari, Inc. The game, which takes great inspiration from the television series Star Trek, contains the first known Easter egg in any arcade game. The arcade game was distributed in Japan by Namco in 1978, and was ported to the Atari 2600 as Star Ship.

== Gameplay ==
The object of Starship 1 is to destroy alien spacecraft while maneuvering "Starship Atari" through star and asteroid fields, "saving the Federation".

The game uses a first person perspective on a black-and-white monitor. The player's ship is controlled with a control yoke that is connected to two potentiometers. There is also a lever that controls whether the ship is moving "fast" or "slow". Compared to common arcade games of the time, Starship 1 was comparatively advanced, but used quite a bit of analog technology that would become less common in arcade games in following years.

As enemies appear onscreen, the player tries to center the enemy in the crosshairs and shoot it with his "phasors" by pulling a trigger on the control yoke. Alternatively, the player has 5 "proton torpedoes" per game that can be fired by pressing a large white button on the dashboard. This will destroy any enemy ship on screen, regardless of whether it is in the crosshairs (which are not game generated graphics but taped directly on the monitor screen).

Four distinct enemies appear: Star Trek-inspired starships worth 50 points, eyed worm-like alien creatures and Klingon type ships each worth 100 points, and a flashing flying saucer craft worth 200 points.

The player does not view the game monitor directly; the monitor is recessed in the cabinet, and the player views a reflected image of the monitor in a half-silvered mirror with a space background.

== Easter egg ==
According to research by Ed Fries, Starship 1 contains the first known Easter egg in any arcade game. Fries confirmed with designer Ron Milner that by activating the machine's controls in the appropriate sequence, the game displays the message "Hi Ron!" (in reference to Milner) and gives ten free games.
