= Skate Boardin' =

1987 video game

- Developer: Absolute Entertainment
- Publisher: Activision
- Designer: David Crane
- Platform: Atari 2600
- Release: 1987
- Mode: Single-player

Skate Boardin' is a video game developed by Absolute Entertainment for the Atari 2600 and published in 1987 by Activision. It was written by Absolute co-founder David Crane,, creator of the hugely successful Pitfall! (1982).It is one of the first skateboarding-based video games, preceded by at least the 720° arcade game and Skate Rock for the Commodore 64, both from 1986.

== Gameplay ==
The player jumping from a ramp

The player must locate and successfully negotiate thirty hidden tricks in the form of ramps and pipes within a time limit of five minutes. To save time it is possible to skitch on the back of moving vehicles. The fire button makes the player jump, which is necessary for remounting the skateboard after falling off. Jumping can also be used to get past hurdles. Continuing to hold the fire button results in a crouch, needed for passing through pipes.

Additional challenges include finding the most efficient route through the maze and avoiding various obstacles that slow the player down.

== Development ==
Skateboardin' was one of the first games announced from Absolute Entertainment.

== Legacy ==
A follow-up titled Super Skateboardin' was released in December 1988 for the Atari 7800.

Skate Boardin' was re-released in 2002, as part of the Activision Anthology collection.
