= Cosmic Commuter =

1985 video game

- Developer: Activision
- Publisher: Activision
- Designer: John Van Ryzin
- Platform: Atari 2600
- Release: 1985
- Genre: Scrolling shooter
- Mode: Single-player

Cosmic Commuter is a horizontally scrolling shooter designed by John Van Ryzin and for the Atari 2600 and published by Activision in 1985. The player pilots a space craft that operates like a bus, picking up commuters along route while avoiding hazards and monitoring fuel. Once at least one person is collected, the player can return to a launch pad and perform the task again with more obstacles.

Cosmic Commuter was Van Ryzin's first game for Activision, after developing a few games for the Apple II computer. After developing it for nine months, play testers did not find the game fun, leading Van Ryzin to develop a new game titled H.E.R.O. which was released in 1984. Activision would later release Cosmic Commuter in 1985.

Computer Entertainer described Cosmic Commuter as being too much of a basic variation on other earlier scrolling shooters like Defender and Chopper Command (1982).

== Gameplay ==
Gameplay screenshot

Cosmic Commuter is set in the year 2075 where the player pilots a spacecraft called the Astrobus. The player must first land their rocket module gently on the surface. Afterwards, the players navigates the Astrobus across a horizontally scrolling screen. The can pick up commuters across the surface bus stops by flying the Astrobus over them. While traversing the route, the player can collect fuel which is depleted during the route, and shoot obstacles such as meteors, fireballs and space mines with a laser beam equipped to the Astrobus.

A beep will sound when the players has completed their Astrobus route, indicating they must traverse back to the rocket module landing pad as long as they have picked up at least one commuter. After this, the ship moves to another commuter route where the traffic hazards are more difficult to avoid.

== Development ==
Cosmic Commuter was developed by John Van Ryzin for the video game company Activision. Van Ryzin was an intern at Wickstead Design developing electronic toys and gadgets where he met game developer Garry Kitchen. After graduation, Van Ryzin was working as an electrical engineer when Kitchen offered him a contract with Hayden Publishing to program games for the Apple II. This led to Van Ryzin quitting his job and developing games for the home computer in Kitchen's basement. The company published three of his Apple II games in 1982: Kamikaze, Shuttle Intercept, and Bellhop which was a collaboration between him and Kitchen.

Kitchen joined Activision in June 1982. As Activision grew as a company, it began setting up satellite offices outside of its main California location. The first of these areas was in a New Jersey office, which was set-up for Kitchen and a few other staff members, including Van Ryzin.

Van Ryzin first project for Activision was Cosmic Commuter which was in development for nine months. He described the game as being influenced by the Apple II game Choplifter (1982). While the game had an outerspace setting, he said he was not a fan of video games set in space, but joked that "it did mean I could have a black background." Cosmic Commuter features a landing sequence at the star which he described as being complicated to code, and that writing code to have the craft burst apart was even more complicated.

During early playtests of the game, it was decided that it was not ready for release. Van Ryzin was told it was well done technically, but play testers did not find it fun. This led to him developing his next game which would become H.E.R.O. (1984). Van Ryzin later said in an interview published in 2025 that he thought he was going to be fired after working on Cosmic Commuter, but said he was just instructed "to make another [game] that was more fun." which led him to focus less on the graphics as he had on Cosmic Commuter for his next game H.E.R.O..

== Release and reception ==
Prototype carts of Cosmic Commuter were circulated prior to the games release in 1984. The game received a commercial release in 1985, a year after the release of H.E.R.O.. It was later included in the video game compilation releases Atari 2600 Action Pack (1995) and Activision Anthology (2002).

A review in Computer Entertainer said that Cosmic Commuter was "not recommended", describing it as a "highly simplified Defender-style" game with mediocre graphics. In a retrospective review, Scott Alan Marriott of AllGame wrote that the game had good control, it was "very disappointing" as it did not aspire to do more than already existing games such as Defender and Chopper Command (1982). He referred to it as a black sheep of the Activision games for the Atari 2600, whose catalogue of games he described were otherwise quality titles.

== See also ==
- Space Jockey (video game)
- Space Taxi
- List of Activision games: 1980–1999
