= Laser Blast =

1981 video game

- Developer: Activision
- Publisher: Activision
- Designer: David Crane
- Platform: Atari 2600
- Release: NA: March 1981
- Genre: Shoot 'em up
- Mode: Single-player

Laser Blast is a shoot 'em up video game developed and published by Activision in March 1981 for the Atari VCS console (renamed to Atari 2600 in 1982). Designed by David Crane, one of Activision's co-founders, it places players in control of flying saucers attacking land targets.

== Gameplay ==
Gameplay screenshot

The object of Laser Blast is to destroy a series of land-based enemies. The player controls a fleet of flying saucers, operating one at a time. On the planet's surface below is a group of three mobile laser bases, guarded by an invisible force field that prevents the player's saucer from getting too close to the surface. Both the player and the enemy bases are armed with laser blasters, which may fire a single continuous beam at a time. If the player's saucer is hit, it will lose altitude and crash to the ground, but the player may direct this fall, potentially into one of the bases, destroying it as well. Each succeeding wave of enemy bases moves faster and targets the player's saucers more quickly, while the force field becomes stronger and decreases the amount of space in which the saucer can move.

Players score points for each base destroyed, with points multiplying each wave up to a maximum of 90 points per base. Players earn extra flying saucers with every 1000 points scored and may keep a maximum of six extra saucers in reserve.

Players who scored 100,000 points or more could submit photographic proof to Activision and be admitted to the Activision Federation of Laser Blasters. When the score of 999,999 is reached, the digits in the score turn to exclamation points, and the game ends.

== Reception ==
Laser Blast earned an Honorable Mention for "Best Science Fiction Game" in 1982 at the Third Annual Arkie Awards.

== Legacy ==
Activision re-released Laser Blast as part of its Activision Anthology video game, made available for a number of consoles at various times in the 2000s.

== See also ==
- List of Atari 2600 games
- List of Activision games: 1980–1999
