= Boxing (1980 video game) =

1980 video game

- Developer: Activision
- Publisher: Activision
- Designer: Bob Whitehead
- Platform: Atari 2600
- Release: August 1980
- Genres: Fighting, sports
- Modes: Single-player, multiplayer

Boxing is a video game interpretation of the sport of boxing, developed by programmer Bob Whitehead for the Atari VCS (later renamed to the Atari 2600). It was published by Activision in 1980 and is one of the first video games developed by Activision. The game is based on Boxer, an unreleased 1978 arcade game from Whitehead's previous employer, Atari, Inc. Boxer was written by Mike Albaugh who also wrote Drag Race for Atari, a game cloned by Activision as Dragster.

== Gameplay ==
White is landing a punch on black.

Boxing shows a top-down view of two boxers, one white and one black. When close enough, a boxer can hit his opponent with a punch (executed by pressing the fire button on the Atari joystick). This causes his opponent to reel back slightly. Long punches score one point, while closer punches (power punches, from the manual) score two. There are no knockdowns or rounds. A match is completed either when one player lands 100 punches (a "knockout") or two minutes have elapsed (a "decision"). In the case of a decision, the player with more landed punches is the winner. Ties are possible.

While the gameplay is simple, there are subtleties, such as getting an opponent on the "ropes" and "juggling" him back and forth between alternate punches.

== Reception ==
Boxing was reviewed by Video magazine in its "Arcade Alley" column where it was described as "demonstrat[ing] Activision's willingness to strike out boldly in new directions" and praised for keeping things from "becoming needlessly complex" by making automatic punch-type selection for the player.

== Legacy ==
Boxing was made available on Microsoft's Game Room service in 2010.

In 2011, an extended academic version of the game, called Clever Boxer, was developed as a benchmark for game AI.

Boxing was shown briefly being played in the Season 8 The Walking Dead episode The Big Scary U.

Boxing was featured as an Easter egg minigame in Call of Duty: Black Ops Cold War.

== See also ==
- List of Atari 2600 games
- List of Activision games: 1980–1999
