= Stampede (video game) =

1981 video game

- Developer(s): Activision
- Publisher(s): Activision
- Designer(s): Bob Whitehead
- Platform(s): Atari 2600, Intellivision
- Release: 2600: NA: December 1981; Intellivision: NA: December 1982
- Genre(s): Action
- Mode(s): Single-player

Stampede is an action game written by Bob Whitehead for the Atari Video Computer System (later called the Atari 2600) and published by Activision in 1981. Stampede is a left-to-right horizontally scrolling action game with a cattle round-up theme. An Intellivision version was released the following year.

== Gameplay ==
Atari 2600 original

An Activision catalog from 1982 advertised Stampede in the following way:

Ready for a little round up? With Stampede by Activision, you'll have to ride fast and rope even faster. Those little dogies seem to be everywhere, and they're all worth points. But, be careful! Your ol' horse can get a little edgy, especially when you take your eyes off the trail. So, head out West for hours of fun with Stampede!

The objective of Stampede is to round up all of the cattle without letting any pass by. To do so, the player must lasso each one in order to capture it. The player is initially only allowed to let two cattle pass; if a third one slips by, the game is over. All of the cattle run in the same direction as the player, albeit slower. The one exception is the Black Angus calf, which is described by the game as "stubborn", and remains motionless, forcing the player to prioritize the calf.

An important caveat to this is that the player gets one extra free pass for every 1,000 points scored. If a player were at 2,000 points and had not yet let any cattle pass, the player would be allowed to let four cattle pass before the fifth one ended the game (assuming the player did not reach 3,000 points).

This makes it possible for an expert player to repeatedly beat the game, as after about 5,000 points or so the game essentially "resets", and the same pattern is repeated. According to David Yancey, there is a bug which makes it so that the game will typically only allow the player to play in a loop for eight play throughs; apparently, however, there is a version of the game with a different binary which allows one to continue to accrue points until the score 99,999 is reached.

== Reception ==
Stampede was favorably reviewed in 1982 by Video magazine where it was described as a "thrilling representation of rope ridin'" boasting "charming visuals". The reviewers noted that although the game only utilized 2k of ROM, it demonstrated Activision's success in "marketing new and unusual games" and showed that "expanding memory isn't the only way to create solid, playable games".

Richard A. Edwards reviewed the Atari version of Stampede in The Space Gamer No. 53 and called it one of the best strategy and action games for the Atari system.

In 1983, Video Games stated that the Intellivision version of Stampede was easier than the difficult Atari 2600 original with identical graphics. Danny Goodman of Creative Computing Video & Arcade Games was surprised that the Intellivision version's graphics "were scarcely more detailed than their Atari ancestors".

== Reviews ==
- Games
- Games

== See also ==
- List of Atari 2600 games
- List of Activision games: 1980–1999
