= Dragonfire (video game) =

1982 video game

- Intellivision box art
- Developer: Imagic
- Publisher: Imagic
- Designer: Bob Smith
- Platforms: Atari 2600, ColecoVision, Commodore 64, VIC-20, Intellivision, TRS-80 Color Computer, Apple II
- Release: May 21, 1982: 2600; 1982: Intellivision; 1983: VIC, Spectrum; 1984: Apple, C64, ColecoVision, CoCo
- Genre: Action
- Modes: Single-player, multiplayer

Dragonfire is a 1982 video game written by Bob Smith and published by Imagic. The player grabs treasure guarded by a dragon while avoiding fireballs. It was originally released for the Atari 2600 then ported to the Intellivision, VIC-20, Commodore 64, Apple II, ZX Spectrum, ColecoVision, and TRS-80 Color Computer.

The game's source code was put into the public domain by developer Bob Smith on May 24, 2003.

== Gameplay ==
The player jumping over a fireball on the first stage, the castle bridge

The second stage: the treasure room

Each level of Dragonfire has two stages. The first stage is a side view of the character trying to cross a drawbridge to reach a castle. To traverse the bridge, the player must duck under high fireballs and jump over low fireballs. Upon success, the second stage begins, which has a more top-down point of view. The player guides the character around the room collecting treasure and dodging fireballs spewed by a dragon that patrols the bottom of the screen. Collecting every piece of treasure opens a door to the next level.

A single hit from a fireball in either stage takes one of the player's seven initial lives. In each level, the character and fireballs get progressively faster.

== Reception ==
Electronic Games in 1983 described Dragonfire as "especially useful as an introduction to fantasy gaming for younger players — while still having enough thrills to please the rest". The game would go on to receive a Certificate of Merit in the category of "1984 Best Videogame Audio-Visual Effects (Less than 16K ROM)" at the 5th annual Arkie Awards.
