= Skiing (Atari 2600 video game) =

1980 video game

- Developer: Activision
- Publisher: Activision
- Designer: Bob Whitehead
- Platform: Atari 2600
- Release: December 1980
- Genre: Sports
- Mode: Single-player

Skiing is a video game cartridge for the Atari 2600. It was authored by Bob Whitehead and released by Activision in 1980. It is one of the first video games developed by Activision.

== Gameplay ==
Gameplay

Skiing is a single-player only game, in which the player uses the joystick to control the direction and speed of a stationary skier at the top of the screen, while the background graphics scroll upwards, thus giving the illusion the skier is moving. The player must avoid obstacles, such as trees and moguls. The game cartridge contains five variations each of two principal games.

In the downhill mode, the player's goal is to reach the bottom of the ski course as rapidly as possible, while a timer records the player's relative success.

In the slalom mode, the player must similarly reach the end of the course as rapidly as possible, but must at the same time pass through a series of gates (indicated by a pair of closely spaced flagpoles). Each gate missed counts as a penalty against the player's time.

== Promotion ==
Skiing was promoted via a 30-second TV commercial featuring a man named as Claude Lafeet, world class skier, demonstrating how to play the game (including the various obstacles into which a player can crash), while speaking English with a stereotypical French accent. The commercial ends with a close-up of the game box, with the man's voice heard off-screen (now speaking in a general American accent) saying, "I think I hurt myself", in reference to his numerous virtual crashes.

== Reception ==
Richard A. Edwards reviewed Skiing in The Space Gamer No. 43 and called it a simple game with "excellent" graphics and varying scenarios.

Chris Pirih, the creator of SkiFree, cited Skiing as the inspiration for the text-based game called Ski that eventually became SkiFree.

== See also ==
- List of Atari 2600 games
- List of Activision games: 1980–1999
