= Chopper Command =

1982 video game

- Developer: Activision
- Publisher: Activision
- Designer: Bob Whitehead
- Platform: Atari 2600
- Release: June 1982
- Genre: Scrolling shooter
- Mode: Single-player

Chopper Command is a horizontally scrolling shooter video game released by Activision for the Atari 2600 in June 1982. It was written by Bob Whitehead. The player flies a helicopter left and right over a scrolling, wraparound landscape, shooting down enemy airplanes to protect a convoy of trucks below.

== Gameplay ==
The player's helicopter (left) dealing with two enemy helicopters and a jet

In Chopper Command, the player controls a military helicopter in a desert scenario protecting a convoy of trucks. The goal is to destroy all enemy fighter jets and helicopters that attack the player's helicopter and the friendly trucks traveling below, ending the current wave. The game ends when the player loses all of his or her lives or reaches 999,999 points. A radar, called a Long Range Scanner in the instruction manual, shows all enemies, including those not visible on the main screen, similar to Defender.

The player's helicopter is destroyed if it collides with an enemy aircraft or a truck (which destroys the truck as well) or is shot by an enemy. Each enemy bullet splits in two, one going up and one going down. Using the "A" difficulty level results in a slower player shot.

Each enemy helicopter is 100 points and each enemy jet is 200 points. After each wave, bonus points are awarded for remaining trucks.

A player who achieved 10,000 points could send in a photo of the TV screen and receive a "Chopper Commandos" patch.

== Reception ==
Richard A. Edwards reviewed Chopper Command in The Space Gamer No. 56. Edwards commented that "It is well-done, but if you wish to avoid another arcade shooting match, even if it has nice sound and graphics, then pass it up."

Computer and Video Games magazine reviewed the game in 1989, giving it an 83% score and noting it was very similar to Defender. Brett Weiss referred to it as "Defender in the desert".

Chopper Command won "Best Action Video Game" at the 4th annual Arkie Awards.

== Legacy ==
Chopper Command is included in the Activision Anthology.

== See also ==
- List of Atari 2600 games
- List of Activision games: 1980–1999
