= Fishing Derby =

1980 video game

- Developer: Activision
- Publisher: Activision
- Designer: David Crane
- Platform: Atari 2600
- Release: NA: August 1980
- Genre: Sports
- Modes: Single-player, multiplayer

Fishing Derby is a fishing video game written by David Crane for the Atari Video Computer System (renamed to the Atari 2600 in 1982) and published by Activision in 1980. It is one of the first video games developed by Activision.

== Gameplay ==
Screenshot

In Fishing Derby, two fishermen sit on opposite docks over a lake filled with fish (and a shark that passes through). Using the joystick the player is able to move the fishing line left, right, up, and down in the water. When a fish is hooked, the line slowly comes up to the surface of the water. Pressing the fire button on the joystick reels in the fish faster. However, if both fishermen have hooked fish, only one person can reel it in (the one who first hooked the fish). The shark that roams the water will try to eat hooked fish before they surface.

The objective for both fishermen is to reach 99 pounds of fish first. There are six rows of fish; the top two rows have 2 lb. fish, the middle two rows have 4 lb. fish and the two bottom rows have 6 lb. fish. The more valuable fish sit at the bottom, but they are harder to bring in as they run a higher risk of being eaten by the shark.

The game's two variants are simply single-player and multi-player. In both games the objective is to reach 99 lb. of fish first.

== Development ==
David Crane described Fishing Derby as a technical experiment that was turned into a game. He was inspired by aquariums and began with goldfish which were limited to different bands of depth in the water. He also experimented in coding algorithms for sloping lines for a fishing line. As the only one fish could be reeled in at a time, Crane said that the it lacked gameplay and added a shark to provide a threat to the game.

== Reception ==
In Video magazine's "Arcade Alley" column, Fishing Derby was characterized as "imaginative, colorful, and fun" providing children with "better animation than Saturday morning TV and provid[ing] adults with a subtle game of skill". Overall the reviewers recommended it as a family game.

== See also ==
- List of Atari 2600 games
- List of Activision games: 1980–1999
