= Dragster (video game) =

1980 video game

- Developer: Activision
- Publisher: Activision
- Designer: David Crane
- Platform: Atari 2600
- Release: 1980
- Genre: Racing
- Mode: Single-player

Dragster is a 1980 racing video game for the Atari Video Computer System. It was designed by David Crane and is one of the first video games released by Activision.

The objective of the game is to either beat the player's opponent across the screen or to race against the clock for best time, depending on the settings used. Crane was the designer of Dragster, describing it as a homage to the 1977 Kee Games arcade game Drag Race (1977).

== Gameplay ==
Gameplay screenshot

The game can be played single or with two players. The goal is to reach the finish line in the shortest time possible. A countdown of a few seconds introduces a round, during which the player may not shift gears or will be disqualified from the round. Once the race starts, the player needs to accelerate and shift up to four gears.

== Development ==
Dragster was developed by David Crane and was the first. Crane described his game as a homage to the Drag Race (1977) arcade game developed by Atari's Kee Games brand. Crane explained in an interview published in 2025 that he had grown up in the rural Midwestern United States, where "we were somewhat obsessed with 'souping-up' our cars to achieve the lowest times." While Drag Race had a steering wheel, accelerator, and gear shift, Crane's game's for the Atari Video Game System only allowed for a four-position joystick with a single fire button, which led to Crane commenting "figuring out how to control Dragster with [the more limited control scheme] was my crowning achievement there."

Crane developed a new way to display score for the Atari 2600 which is normally set to the left and right of the screen, which Crane described as "very blocky". Activision developed a new way to display the score high-resolution six-digit score display that converted it into graphics that could slide across the screen. Crane stated he designed the game that would hold interest for hours despite the fact that each game would be about six seconds long.

== Reception ==
Dragster was released in 1980 and was Activision's first title for the Atari 2600. The game sold over 500,000 copies and accounted for over half of Activision's first-year revenue.

Dragster was reviewed by Video magazine in its "Arcade Alley" column where it was described as having "an interesting premise" and as being "undeniably clever and, with a lot of patience, ... probably fun" but the reviewers also called it the "least" of Activision's early Atari 2600 releases. Specific criticism was given to the "clumsy" and "annoying" gameplay mechanics, and the game design was characterized as "ill-suited to the Atari control system".

== World record and controversy ==
In 1982, Todd Rogers claimed the world record with a time of 5.51 seconds. Until January 2018, this was accepted by Twin Galaxies and Guinness World Records, which later recognized it as the longest-standing video game record. Rogers said he achieved his time by shifting into second gear as the countdown timer reached zero. Eric "Omnigamer" Koziel, a speedrunner and creator of tool-assisted speedruns, analyzed the source code of the game, and it was discovered that 5.51 seconds was impossible. He did not find it possible to shift during the countdown and determined the best possible time to be 5.57 seconds.

On January 29, 2018, Twin Galaxies removed Todd Rogers' records and banned him from participating in their competitive leaderboards. Guinness World Records also removed him from its database.

The world record stands at 5.57 seconds, which has been achieved by multiple players. Brett Clark of Virginia most recently hit 5.57 on an original Atari with multiple witnesses.

== See also ==
- List of Atari 2600 games
- List of Activision games: 1980–1999
