= Index of DOS games (L) =

This is an index of DOS games.

This list has been split into multiple pages. Please use the Table of Contents to browse it.

Title	Released	Developer(s)	Publisher(s)
L.A. Blaster	1997	Cryo Interactive	CDV Software
La Abadía del Crimen	1988	Opera Soft	Opera Soft
Labyrinth of Time, The	1993	Terra Nova Development	Electronic Arts
La Cosa Nostra	1994	Slade 3D Software	Slade 3D Software
Lakers versus Celtics and the NBA Playoffs	1989	Electronic Arts	Electronic Arts
LA Law: The Computer Game	1992	Synergistic Software, Inc.	Capstone Software
Lancelot	1988	Level 9	Mandarin Software
Lands of Lore: Guardians of Destiny	1997	Westwood Studios	Virgin Interactive
Lands of Lore: The Throne of Chaos	1993	Westwood Studios	Virgin Interactive
Laplace no Ma	1993	Group SNE	Group SNE
Larn	1986	Noah Morgan	Noah Morgan
Laser Chess	1990	Peter Venable	
Laser Squad	1992	Mythos Games	Target Games
Last Action Hero	1993	Bits Studios	Sony Imagesoft
Last Armageddon	1990	BrainGrey	BrainGrey
Last Bounty Hunter, The	1994	American Laser Games	American Laser Games
Last Eichhof, The	1993	Alpha Helix	Alpha Helix
Last Express, The	1997	Smoking Car Productions	Broderbund, Interplay Entertainment
Last Half of Darkness	1989	SoftLab Laboratories	SoftLab Laboratories
Last Half of Darkness II	1992	SoftLab Laboratories	SoftLab Laboratories
Last Half of Darkness III	1993	SoftLab Laboratories	SoftLab Laboratories
Last Ninja, The	1987	System 3	System 3
Last Ninja 2: Back with a Vengeance	1988	System 3	System 3
Last Mission, The	1987	Opera Soft	Opera Soft
Lawnmower Man, The	1993	SCi	THQ
Leather Goddesses of Phobos	1986	Infocom	Infocom
Leather Goddesses of Phobos 2: Gas Pump Girls Meet the Pulsating Inconvenience from Planet X!	1992	Infocom	Activision
Legacy of the Ancients	1987	Quest Software	Electronic Arts
Legacy: Realm of Terror	1993	Magnetic Scrolls	Microprose
Legend	1992	Mindscape	Software Toolworks
Legend of Djel	1989	Coktel Vision, Inférence	Tomahawk Software
Legend of Faerghail	1990	Electronic Design Hannover	reLINE Software
Legend of Kyrandia, The	1992	Westwood Studios	Westwood Studios
Legend of Kyrandia: The Hand of Fate, The	1993	Westwood Studios	Westwood Studios
Legend of Kyrandia: Malcolm's Revenge, The	1994	Westwood Studios	Westwood Studios
Legend of Sword and Fairy, The	1995	Softstar Entertainment	Softstar Entertainment
Legend of the Red Dragon	1989	Robinson Technologies	Robinson Technologies
Legend of the Sword	1989	Silicon Soft	Rainbird Software
Legends of Valour	1992	Synthetic Dimensions	U.S. Gold
Leisure Suit Larry in the Land of the Lounge Lizards	1987	Sierra On-line	Sierra On-line
Leisure Suit Larry Goes Looking for Love (in Several Wrong Places)	1988	Sierra On-line	Sierra On-line
Leisure Suit Larry 3: Passionate Patti in Pursuit of the Pulsating Pectorals	1989	Sierra Entertainment	Sierra Entertainment
Leisure Suit Larry 5: Passionate Patti Does a Little Undercover Work	1991	Sierra Entertainment	Sierra Entertainment
Leisure Suit Larry 6: Shape Up or Slip Out!	1993	Sierra On-Line	Sierra On-Line
Leisure Suit Larry: Love for Sail!	1996	Sierra On-Line	Sierra On-Line
Lemmings	1991	DMA Design	Psygnosis
Lemmings 2: The Tribes	1993	DMA Design	Psygnosis
Lemmings 3D	1995	Clockwork Games	Psygnosis, Sony Computer Entertainment
Lemmings Chronicles, The	1994	DMA Design	Psygnosis
L'Empereur	1991	Koei	Koei
Les Manley in: Lost in L.A.	1991	Accolade	Accolade
Les Manley in: Search for the King	1990	Accolade	Accolade
Lethal Tender	1993	Pie in the Sky Software	Froggman
Lethal Weapon	1992	Eurocom, Ocean Software	Ocean Software
Lewmph	1998	Hawthorne Computer Entertainment	
Lexi-Cross	1991	Interplay Entertainment	Interplay Entertainment
LHX Attack Chopper	1990	Electronic Arts	Electronic Arts
Liberty or Death	1994	Koei	Koei
Liero	1999	Joosa Riekkinen	
Life & Death	1988	Jake Smith, Don Laabs	Software Toolworks
Light Corridor, The	1990	Infogrames	Infogrames
Lighthouse: The Dark Being	1996	Sierra On-Line	Sierra On-Line
Lightspeed	1990	MPS Labs	MicroProse
LineWars II	1994	Patrick Aalto	Safari Software
Links 386 Pro	1992	Access Software	Access Software
Links LS 1997	1996	Access Software	Access Software
Links: The Challenge of Golf	1990	Access Software	Access Software
Linley's Dungeon Crawl	1997	Linley Henzell	Linley Henzell
Linus Spacehead's Cosmic Crusade	1993	Codemasters	Codemasters
Lion	1995	Manley & Associates	Sanctuary Woods
Lion King, The	1994	Westwood Studios, Virgin Interactive, Dark Technologies	Virgin Interactive, Walt Disney Computer Software
Litil Divil	1993	Gremlin Interactive	Gremlin Interactive
Little Big Adventure	1994	Adeline Software International	Electronic Arts, Activision
Little Big Adventure 2	1997	Adeline Software International	Electronic Arts, Activision, Virgin Interactive
Llamatron	1991	Jeff Minter	Llamasoft
Loadstar: The Legend of Tully Bodine	1995	Rocket Science Games	BMG Interactive
Locus	1995	Zombie LLC	GT Interactive
Lode Runner	1983	Douglas E. Smith	Broderbund, Ariolasoft
Lode Runner: The Legend Returns	1994	Presage	Sierra On-line
Lollypop	1994	Brain Bug	Softgold
Loom	1990	Lucasfilm Games	Lucasfilm Games
Loopz	1990	Audiogenic	Mindscape
Lords of Chaos	1991	Mythos Games	Blade Software
Lords of Conquest	1986	Eon Software	Electronic Arts
Lords of Midnight	1991	Chris Wild	
Lords of the Realm	1994	Impressions Games	Impressions Games
Lords of the Realm II	1996	Impressions Games	Sierra Entertainment
Lords of the Realm II: Siege Pack	1996	Impressions Games	Sierra Entertainment
Lords of the Rising Sun	1989	Cinemaware	Cinemaware
Lost Adventures of Kroz	1990	Scott Miller	Apogee Software
The Lost Crown of Queen Anne	1988		Softdisk
Lost Dutchman Mine	1989	Magnetic Images	Magnetic Images
Lost Dutchman's Gold	1982		International PC Owners
Lost Eden	1995	Cryo Interactive	Virgin Interactive
Lost Files of Sherlock Holmes, The: The Case of the Rose Tattoo	1996	Mythos Software	Electronic Arts
Lost Files of Sherlock Holmes, The: The Case of the Serrated Scalpel	1992	Mythos Software	Electronic Arts
Lost in Time	1993	Coktel Vision	Sierra On-Line
Lost Patrol	1990	Shadow Development	Ocean Software
Lost Vikings, The	1992	Silicon & Synapse	Interplay Entertainment
Lotus III: The Ultimate Challenge	1992	Magnetic Fields	Gremlin Graphics
Lunar Command	1993	Wesson International	Mallard Software
Lure of the Temptress	1992	Revolution Software	Virgin Interactive
Lurking Horror, The	1987	Infocom	Infocom
