= Glyn Anderson =

American video game designer

- Known for: Video games

Glyn Anderson is a video game designer and programmer and musician, first developing games for the Intellivision console. He wrote the cross-platform sound and music driver used on many Activision games between 1989 and 1992, including Ghostbusters II and Lexi-Cross.

== Career ==
Anderson started making games in 1980 as a programmer at APh Technological Consulting, the company that created the Intellivision for Mattel. He then worked at Activision creating Atari 8-bit and Commodore 64 versions of Megamania, Ghostbusters, and Hacker II: The Doomsday Papers.

Anderson's current company, Game Production Services, creates Location-based Immersive Virtual Experience (LIVE) training simulations, such as the Infantry Immersive Trainer and Joint Fires & Effects Trainer System (JFETS), primarily for the U.S. military.

== Games ==
Year	Title	Company
2003	Need for Speed	Electronic Arts
2003	Terminator 3	Infogrames
2002	Stuntman	Infogrames
2002	Magi-Nation	Interactive Imagination
1999	Test Drive: Off-Road 3	Infogrames
1998	Mission Impossible	Infogrames
1998	Deadlock II: Shrine Wars	Accolade
1997	Mona & Moki 1: Drive Me Wild!	Lightspan
1997	Mona & Moki 2: Drive Me Wilder!	Lightspan
1997	Secret of Googol 5: Googolfest - Party Isle / Toy Isle	Lightspan
1997	Timeless Math 4: Lunar Base	Lightspan
1995	X-Perts	Sega
1995	Golden Nugget	Virgin Interactive
1994	Mutant League Hockey	Electronic Arts
1994	Pirates of the Caribbean	Disney Interactive
1992	Leather Goddesses of Phobos 2: Gas Pump Girls Meet the Pulsating Inconvenience from Planet X!	Activision
1992	The Manhole: New and Enhanced	Activision
1991	Lexi-Cross	Interplay
1991	Trump Castle II	Capstone
1990	Circuit's Edge	Infocom
1990	F-14 Tomcat	Activision
1990	Shanghai II: Dragon's Eye	Activision
1989	BattleTech: The Crescent Hawks' Revenge	Infocom
1989	Ghostbusters II	Activision
1989	The Manhole: New and Enhanced	Activision
1989	Rampage	Activision
1989	Stealth ATF	Activision
1986	Aliens: The Computer Game	Activision
1986	Hacker II: The Doomsday Papers	Activision
1985	Future Ball (complete but unpublished)	Activision
1984	Ghostbusters	Activision
1984	Web Dimension	Activision
1983	Megamania	Activision
1982	Land Battle	APh
1982	Adventures of Tron	APh
