= Megamania =

1982 video game

- Atari 2600 box art
- Developer: Activision
- Publisher: Activision
- Designer: Steve Cartwright
- Programmers: Atari 2600; Steve Cartwright; Atari 8-bit, 5200; Glyn Anderson
- Platforms: Atari 2600, Atari 5200, Atari 8-bit
- Release: Atari 2600: September 24, 1982; Atari 5200: November 1983; Atari 8-bit: 1984
- Genre: Fixed shooter
- Modes: Single-player, multiplayer

Megamania is a fixed shooter video game developed by Steve Cartwright for the Atari 2600 and published by Activision in 1982. In the game, a pilot of an intergalactic space cruiser has a nightmare where his ship is being attacked by food and household objects. Using the missile launcher from their space cruiser, the pilot fends off the attackers. The game was later released for the Atari 5200 and Atari 8-bit computers.

Cartwright initially found inspiration for Megamania's gameplay from the arcade game Astro Blaster (1981). After completing a variation of the game, the team at Activision felt it needed a different form to separate itself from various space shooter games on the market, eventually leading to Activision's ad agency developing the food-induced nightmare theme. The game took nine months for Cartwright to develop.

Initial response to Megamania had critics split with early reviews complimenting the graphics and varied movement of the enemies, while others felt it was another game in an already oversaturated field of games influenced by Space Invaders (1978). The game received the "Most Humorous Home Arcade Game" at the 4th annual Arkie Awards, and in 1984 Video and Computer Gaming Illustrated declared Megamania as the best Atari 2600 game.

== Gameplay ==
Atari 2600 gameplay. The player's ship—the blue object at the bottom—is being attacked by enemy hamburgers.

In Megamania, the player is a pilot of a machine referred to as both an intergalactic space cruiser and a mobile blaster. After a day of work, the pilot gorges themself on food ranging from ice cream to pizzas and begins to hallucinate. At home after falling asleep, the pilot finds themself in a nightmare being attacked by various food and household objects such as hamburgers, steam irons and bow ties. The player must control their fleet of mobile blasters that are under attack from these objects.

Megamania can be played with one player, or two players taking turns. The goal of Megamania is to accumulate points by knocking out as many enemy objects as possible by firing the ship's missile launcher at them before the players own fleet of three space cruisers is destroyed. The player can earn an extra space cruiser in reserve for every 10,000 points earned.

There are eight waves of enemies which move with different frequency and attack patterns. Each wave has the point value of each object increase, until the eighth wave featuring "Space Dice", after which, all enemies are worth 90 points each and the enemies palette color and patterns change. The game is timed by an energy bar at the bottom of the screen that gradually depletes during each wave. If it runs out, the player loses a blaster. Bonus points are rewarded after each round for how much energy is left in each bar.

Using the game options on the Atari, the player can choose between guided missiles, or straight missiles. Guided missiles can be steered by following your joystick movement. With straight missiles, they streak straight up.

== Development ==
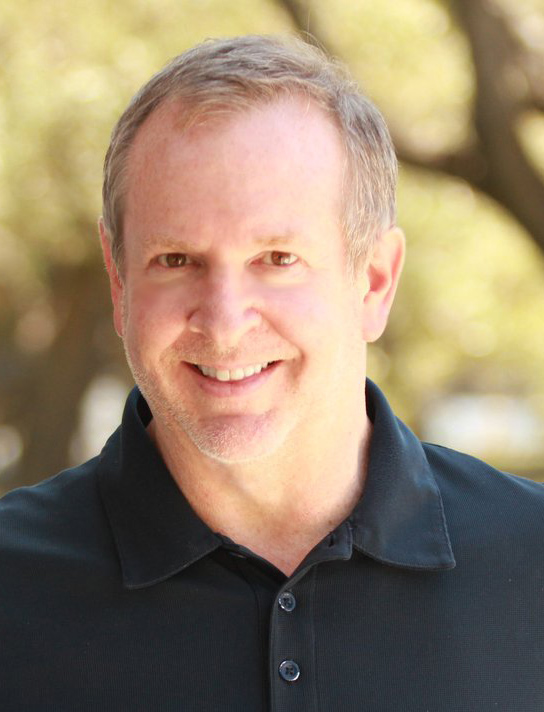
Steve Cartwright in 2011. Megamania was Cartwright's second game for Activision following Barnstorming (1982).

Megamania was designed by Steve Cartwright for Activision. Prior to working at the company, Cartwright had gone to college with David Crane at the DeVry Institute of Technology in Phoenix. When Crane and Alan Miller created their own company Activision, they found quick success leading them to hire new employees, which included Crane's friend Cartwright. Megamania was his second game for Activision following Barnstorming (1982). He was inspired to create the game after seeing Astro Blaster at a Chuck E. Cheese restaurant. Cartwright developed a ship similar to that of Astro Blaster. Designing the ship showed him how simple the graphics had to be for the system, as he could only use eight bits and one color for the ship.

Cartwright found developing the game for the Atari 2600 to be difficult, especially for code to define how objects were displayed. It required handling multiple objects moving horizontally, passing each other vertically, and missiles passing vertically through rows of objects, which Cartwright explained as what "might seem like a trivial task using today's technology actually took months of late-night coding to figure out." Megamania was designed to fit a 4 kilobyte ROM for its graphics, code and sound. It took over nine months for Cartwright to develop.

After completing development of the gameplay, Cartwright felt that the market was overloaded with space-themed shooter games but was confident in the gameplay of Megamania and thought of ways to make it stand out in the marketplace. Ideas included titling it Space Game as an anti-marketing effort. Tom Lopez at Activision suggested the title GadZooks! which led to Activision's ad agency unveiling its concept that the game was about a spaceship commander who had nightmare after eating too much junk food, leading to enemy ships becoming objects like hamburgers, spinning dice, tires and bowties. After this, the game was then titled Megamania.

== Release ==
Megamania was released for the Atari 2600 on September 24, 1982. Electronic Games listed Megamania along with Robot Tank (1983), Enduro (1983), River Raid (1982) and Pitfall! (1982) as being among the biggest hits for Activision in 1983. Sales figures are not known, but Jim Levy did not include Megamania when discussing which of Activision's games that had sold over one million copies in an interview in June 1984.

Ports of the game were announced for consoles like the ColecoVision and Atari 5200 and computers such as the Commodore 64 and MSX, but were only released for the Atari 5200 and Atari 8-bit computers. Megamania was released for the Atari 5200 in November 1983. Game critic Lou Hudson reported that Atari 5200 version of the game was not planned to be heavily promoted until after the Christmas season, to keep it from competing with the Atari 2600. The Atari 8-bit version was released in 1984. Both releases were adapted by Glyn Anderson.

Megamania was included in several game compilations such as Activision Anthology (2002) for Windows, PlayStation 2, and Game Boy Advance and Activision Hits Remixed (2006) for the PlayStation Portable. A version of Megamania developed by the South American group Ivolgamus appeared in Arcade Zone (2009) for the Wii. Their version of the game features altered play control and new graphics. Atari teased a large announcement on August 20, 2026 which was revealed a re-release of several Activision games for the Atari 2600. This included Megamania set for a November 2026 release.

== Reception ==
Critical response to the game was split. Critics who enjoyed the game complimented the graphics and variation on the genre. In JoyStik, an anonymous reviewer called it "one of the most original variations of the bottom-shooter concept ever created exclusively for home console" and said that "even the best Invaders players will find surprising new challenges". The reviewer gave the game high ratings for game play, longevity and graphics. The Video Game Update declared the game a "dazzling and relentless action game" praising the challenge and sound effects. Bill Kunkel and Arnie Katz of Electronic Games described it as "an example of Activision at its whimsical best" and praised the varied gameplay, graphics and sound effects, declaring that it was one of the most addicting games they had played in a long time. Lou Hudson writing in the Fort Worth Star-Telegram gave the game a mixed-review, finding it too derivative of Space Invaders and that the graphic and theme was better than the game itself, while also describing it as "Space Invaders with a vengeance", noting the more complicated patterns that enemies use to approach the player in Megamania. Hudson concluded that "It's a nightmare all right, and in terms of color, detail, variety and toughness, it's a very good nightmare. I just can't get all that excited over [Space Invaders] games any more."

Video magazine reviewed the Atari 8-bit version in 1984, describing it "hardly different" in terms of gameplay from the original Atari 2600 version, but emphasizing its "visually enhanced" graphics that allow players "to clearly distinguish what each wave of attacking objects is supposed to represent". Reviewing the Atari 8-bit Computer version of the game, Computer Entertainer stated that it was even better than the Atari 2600 version of the game, noting challenging gameplay, fast-paced action, high quality sound effects and the graphic and humor, specifically noting details like treads on the tire enemies as they spin. The review concluded "the variations on the invasion game are many, but few have the graphic excellence and superb challenge of Megamania." Michael Blanchet gave a negative review of the Atari computer and 5200 versions of the game, writing that the game was not significantly better than the Atari 2600 version. While praising the graphics, Blanchet stated that the claims of the game being a parody of shoot-'em ups was weak, writing that "at first the idea of fighting off hamburgers might solicit a nervous giggle or two. But any amusement quickly fades. Facades and hype aside, Megamania is just another shoot-'em-up."

The Atari 2600 version of Megamania received an award for "Most Humorous Home Arcade Game" at the 4th annual Arkie Awards in 1983. The editors and writers of the magazine Video and Computer Gaming Illustrated listed Megamania as the best Atari 2600 game in March 1984, specifically highlighting the game's various enemy designs, attack patterns, and sound effects. It was also the runner-up as the "Best Game for Consoles", only beaten by Centipede.

From retrospective reviews, Computer and Video Games reviewed the game in 1989, stating the gameplay was slick and fast, and Megamania remained a simple and addictive shoot 'em up. Scott Alan Marriott of AllGame echoed earlier favorable reviews that what set Megamania apart was the variety of patterns the enemies had, and declared it "one of the most enjoyable games in Activision's impressive library" for the Atari 2600. Brett Weiss in his book The 100 Greatest Console Video Games 1977-1987 (2014) did not include the game in his top 100, finding that it did not rank up with other console games such as Space Invaders (1980) or Communist Mutants from Space (1982). Weiss described the Atari 5200 version as superior, as its graphics let you recognize the objects you were shooting at.

== Legacy ==
Following the release of Megamania, Cartwright continued to work at Activision, making games such as Plaque Attack (1983), Frostbite (1983), Hacker (1985) and Aliens: The Computer Game (1986). Like Megamania, his other games such as Seaquest (1983) and Frostbite had roots in arcade games, such as Defender (1981) and Frogger (1981) respectively. Cartwright re-used the code for Megamania for Plaque Attack. He later worked on other series for other companies such as the Les Manley series for Accolade and the PGA Tour for Electronic Arts.

Cartwright later reflected on his Atari 2600 games in 2016, saying that "Many people consider Megamania, Seaquest and Frostbite to be the three best fast action games ever done for the Atari 2600. I certainly would never argue with that."

== See also ==
- Spider Fighter
- Threshold, another game inspired by Astro Blaster
- List of Atari 2600 games
- List of Activision games: 1980–1999
