= Atari 2600 Action Pack =

- Developer: Activision
- Publisher: Activision
- Platforms: Windows, Macintosh
- Release: May 1995

Atari 2600 Action Pack is a 1995 video game compilation developed and published by Activision. The release consists of 15 of companies games made for the Atari 2600 video game console. The game was released during the early popular use of the internet where the popularity of retrogaming began to expand exponentially. This led to companies releasing compilation titles such as the Atari 2600 Action Pack. The games emulator was programmed by Mike Livesay and was his first game he made for the Windows 95 operating system.

The game was announced in 1995 and released the same year for Microsoft Windows and Macintosh based computers. A follow-up, Atari 2600 Action Pack 2, was shown as early as May 11 at the Electronic Entertainment Expo 1995. Several reviewers found the games were not up to the standards of contemporary titles in terms of gameplay and graphics and sound. Some more lukewarm reviews found some of the games to have held up better than others, with criticism aimed towards a lack of content for a compact disc game or grammatical mistakes in the interviews with developers.

== Background and development ==
In the early to mid-1990s, an fanbase for retrogaming grew through self-published fanzines such as Tim Duarte's 2600 Connection, Joe Santulli's Digital Press and Frank Polosky's Video Magic. In 1997, Ralph Barbagallo of Digital Diner magazine stated that the contemporary interest of older video games was with the emergence of the internet, with Usenet discussion groups like rec.games.video.classic and its own IRC channel and fan websites developed by its users.

Prior to the mid-1990s, older video games would occasionally be re-released for a few consoles. Following a stronger interest of older games, companies began re-releasing their back catalog in commercially, such as with the 1995 release of Atari 2600 Action Pack.

Jeff Vavasour, who was a programmer on Activision's Commodore 64 15 Pack (1995) and Digital Eclipse's Williams Arcade Classics (1995) was pitched to Activision to use his emulator of the Atari 2600 for a compilation of their games after working on the Commodore 64 15 Pack. Activision opted for Mike Livesay, who had also been bidding on the project.

The game was Livesay's first program made for the Windows 95 operating system. Electronic Gaming Monthly announced that the game would initially include 10 to 15 titles.

== Content ==
Atari 2600 Action Pack included 15 games originally made for the Atari 2600 by Activision. In this release, the games can be played with either a keyboard or computer mouse. Each game is selectable and displays the games as Windows icons to look like the original games box art.

The release includes the following games:

- Boxing
- Chopper Command
- Cosmic Commuter
- Crackpots
- Fishing Derby
- Freeway
- Frostbite
- Grand Prix
- H.E.R.O.
- Kaboom!
- Pitfall!
- River Raid
- Seaquest
- Sky Jinks
- Spider Fighter

Beyond the games, the release also contained commentary from the original developers.

== Release ==
The game was released for Windows on compact disc and 3.5" floppy disk and published by Activision.

Computer Game Review reported it was set to be the first of a four-volume set of releases. A follow-up titled Atari 2600 Action Pack 2 was shown between May 11 and 13th at the Electronic Entertainment Expo 1995 by Activision.

== Reception ==
Reception

Review scores
Publication	Score	
Publication	Macintosh	PC
AllGame		3/5
Computer Game Review		65/100
Electronic Games		B+
Next Generation	1/5	2/5
PC Games		37%

Reviewers in video game magazines Next Generation lacked depth in gameplay, Both Computer Game Review and Next Generation reviewers stated the games would only be fun for a few minutes. The reviewer of the latter magazine said the game was a waste of their high-end graphics card for their Macintosh computer. A review in Wired echoed this, calling the release a "rip-off" as the title featured "subcartoonish graphics, ratchety sound effects, and one-dimensional gameplay." Charles Ardai of Computer Gaming World said "there's no reason to play games this primitive today, when everything else out there is so much better." He compared the release to another compilation title, The Lost Treasures of Infocom stating that the Atari 2600 games felt like "relics", while the Infocom titles had held up. David Upchurch of PC Gaming noted the simplicity made the games not work highlighting Boxing, where you the player can't block or duck, and can only punch when an opponent is in range or Freeway where the players movement is restricted to going up and down the screen.

Ardai and David Upchurch of PC Games complimented the background notes about the history of the games featured, with Ardai stating that the game required further copy-editing for spelling errors.

Steven Bauman of Computer Gaming World found the games graphics and sounds to be of low quality, he did find the games had a "certain undeniable charm", as they did not require contemporary elements of games such as boss characters, detailed cutscenes, or codes to encourage replayability. Electronic Games reviewer Russ Ceccola found the games still fun and appreciated their simplicity, specifically highlighting the titles Pitfall!, Chopper Command, Spider Fighter, and H.E.R.O. as the best titles. Michael L. House of the online game database AllGame said that Pitfall!, Fishing Derby, H.E.R.O., Kaboom! and Frostbite were highlights, but said the game lacked enough titles. He said that a compact disc would be able to hold around 50 games with history on each instead of being released as a series, as it made the release become a "fairly obvious money-making scheme."

Outside of game journalists, Vavasour complimented Livesay's emulator for Windows as a "good product". He said that due to Windows performance issues, the Atari 2600 games are forced to drop frames and look less smooth in game action and that he would have developed the game for MS-DOS if it were his project.

Between its release in May and November 1995, it sold 100,000 copies.
