= Steve Cartwright =

American video game designer

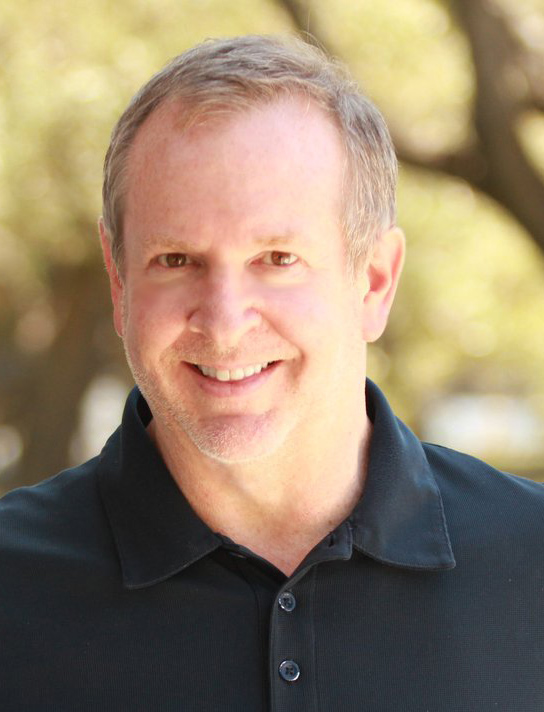
- Cartwright in 2011
- Education: DeVry University
- Occupation: Video game designer
- Website: www.stevecartwright.com

Steve Cartwright is an American video game designer. He is best known as one of the original Activision game designers, credited with such games as Barnstorming, Megamania, Seaquest and Hacker.

== Activision ==
Prior to working at the company, Cartwright had gone to college with David Crane at the DeVry Institute of Technology in Phoenix. When Crane and Alan Miller created their own company Activision, they quickly found success in the video game business, leading them to hire new employees, which included Crane's friend Cartwright.

At Activision, Cartwright designed games for the Atari 2600. These included Barnstorming (1982), Megamania (1982), Seaquest (1983), and Frostbite (1983). In their book Racing the Beam, Ian Bogost and Nick Montfort stated that Cartwright's game design philosophy focused on iteration and refinement. The authors described this style as this sort of technique would later come to be known as skinning. which they noted had negative connotations, "suggesting commercial exploitation without fundamental innovation." while also stating that the design style "was not without its positive qualities. It involved the slow refinement of basic ideas toward perfection."

He later developed games for the Commodore 64 with Hacker (1985), Hacker II (1986), Aliens (1986), and Gee Bee Air Rally (1987).

== Accolade ==
Cartwright joined Accolade as their Senior Designer in 1988. He was in charge of developing new concepts in game design and organizing teams of designers and coordinating the creation and development of new games.

Among his products were the Sierra-style graphic adventures Les Manley in: Search for the King and Les Manley in: Lost in L.A.—the first game to use live actors captured in front of a blue screen.

== Electronic Arts ==
In 1993, Cartwright joined Electronic Arts. He soon took over producer responsibility on the fledgling PGA Tour line and helped redesign the NBA Live product line. Among the many innovations to the golf line were the first use of digitized golfers, the first EA golf product with 3D terrain, and the first use of a targeting arc and putting guides in a golf product.

In 1999, Cartwright designed and produced Tiger Woods '99. Additionally, Cartwright designed the product to include 1-button access to a game server and match server—making this EA's first online multiplayer sports game. Later, with the addition of the "Play Against The Pros" feature, Cartwright was awarded co-patent holder rights to the technology that eventually became the basis of the PGA Tour Shotlink technology.

- PGA Tour 486
- NBA Live 95
- PGA Tour 96
- PGA Tour Pro
- Tiger Woods 99
- Tiger Woods 2000

== Glu Mobile ==
In 2002, Cartwright joined Scott Orr as an internal developer at Glu Mobile, originally known as Sorrent. After a 10-year hiatus from programming, Cartwright developed six of Sorrent's first eight products. During the 2004 presidential election, Cartwright took his previous product FOX Sports Boxing and turned it into Bush vs. Kerry Boxing. He was later named Director of Production where products he designed, produced, or otherwise developed accounted for up to 70% of Glu Mobile revenue.

- FOX Sports Football
- FOX Sports Basketball
- FOX Sports Boxing
- FOX Sports Track & Field
- Yao Ming Basketball
- Atari's DRIV3R
- Deerhunter
- Bush vs. Kerry Boxing
- ZUMA
- Kingdom of Heaven
- Robots
- Diner Dash
- DRIVER: Vegas

== Later career ==
In 2006, Cartwright joined TV Head—later known as TAG Networks—as Executive Producer. TAG was a games-on-demand television network.

In 2008, Cartwright spent several months developing and pursuing VC funding for a Kid's MMO in the vein of Club Penguin. This endeavor was abandoned when he joined Slipgate Ironworks The company later became Gazillion Entertainment.

In 2009, Cartwright joined former colleagues Adam Bellin and Sam Nelson in project design to make sports statistics fun and entertaining. The first project, Streakwise Draft Tracker 2011, reached #2 on the App Store.

In 2010, Cartwright joined RockYou as GM of the Redwood City Games Studio. In his first few weeks, he recruited John Yoo, lead designer on Zynga's CityVille, and helped RockYou establish a relationship with John Romero and his new company, Loot Drop. After managing through a difficult transition period following the layoff of nearly 1/3 of the company, Cartwright became Sr. Director of Design. He then worked closely with Executive Producer Jennifer Gee on the launch of RockYou's Zoo World 2 Facebook project.

More recently, Cartwright lead the design of Bluescape's real-time cloud-based collaboration system. The Bluescape "wall" is currently being used by Lucasfilm to plan and storyboard future Star Wars films.
