= Chicago Syndicate =

Chicago Syndicate may refer to:

- Chicago Syndicate (film), 1955 US film
- Chicago Syndicate (video game), 1995 video game
- Chicago Outfit, an Italian-American crime syndicate based in Chicago, Illinois, U.S.
