= X-Perts =

1996 video game

- Developer: Abalone
- Publisher: Sega
- Designer: Glyn Anderson
- Platform: Genesis
- Release: NA: 1996
- Genre: Beat 'em up
- Mode: Single-player

X-Perts is a side-scrolling beat-'em-up video game produced by Sega and released only in North America for the Sega Genesis in 1996. It is a spin-off of Eternal Champions starring the assassin Shadow Yamoto, who is depicted in her design from Eternal Champions: Challenge from the Dark Side. One of the most high profile of the last wave of Genesis games, it was heavily panned by critics as having dull gameplay and poor control.

== Gameplay ==
The female ninja Shadow leads a group of fellow X-perts in sabotage and other various missions. All three characters have character-specific special moves with differing attributes, along with three unique torture moves, which are used to interrogate various enemies. Players are able to switch characters mid-game in order to carry out different tasks.

== Plot ==
The game's plot is based on an alternate timeline in which Shadow Yamoto was not killed by the Black Orchid in 1993. Instead, she formed a vigilante group. In the game, a group of terrorists took over an undersea weapons factory. Unless the United Nations give into their demands, the terrorists will detonate a thermonuclear device that will destroy Earth. Shadow and the X-Perts embark on a mission to avert the crisis.

== Reception ==
The four reviewers of Electronic Gaming Monthly found the concept of controlling three characters at once in real time to be exciting, but argued that any potential fun is ruined by the repetitiveness of both the action and the missions. Andrew Baran elaborated on the missions: "Even though they are named different things and found in different areas, all they really consist of it you standing in front of something, pressing a button, and waiting for that character to finish." They scored the game a 5.125 out of 10. GamePro panned the game as well, citing "moronic" enemy AI, poor control, ugly animations, repetitive missions, and unoriginal sound effects. A reviewer for Next Generation commented that "as solid as the premise of X-Perts is, the execution and game design ranks among the worst in recent memory. Control of the game's characters is slow and unresponsive with most of the gameplay centered around inept hand-to-hand combat and standing at control panels while commands are being processed." He further criticized the absence of abilities that players had come to take for granted, such as jumping and moving while holding a weapon. The graphics were in his assessment above average for a Genesis game, but nowhere near as good as Toy Story or Earthworm Jim 2. He gave the game one out of five stars.
