= Larn =

Larn may refer to:

- Larn (video game), a 1986 roguelike computer game
- Richard Larn (1931-2026), British author and shipwreck expert

== See also ==
- Larne, a town in Northern Ireland
