= Ghostbusters (1984 video game) =

1984 video game

- Developers: Activision; James Software (CPC, ZX); Bits Laboratory (NES); Compile (Master System)
- Publishers: Activision; Tokuma Shoten (Famicom); Sega (Master System)
- Designer: David Crane
- Programmers: Adam Bellin (C64); Robert McNally (Apple); Glyn Anderson (Atari 8-bit); Robert Rutkowski (MSX, PCjr/Tandy); Dan Kitchen (2600)
- Composers: Russell Lieblich (C64, Apple); Tadashi Sou (NES); Tohru Nakabayashi (Master System)
- Series: Ghostbusters
- Platforms: Commodore 64: MSX; Apple II; ZX Spectrum; Atari 8-bit; Atari 2600; IBM PCjr; Famicom; NES; Master System
- Release: October 26, 1984: Commodore 64; NA: October 26, 1984; EU: Late 1984 ZX Spectrum; EU: Late 1984 Apple II; NA: January 1985 Atari 8-bit; NA: February 1985 PCjr/Tandy 1000; NA: August 23, 1985 Atari 2600; NA: October 1985 Amstrad CPC; EU: 1985 NES/Famicom; JP: September 22, 1986; NA: October 1988 Master System; NA: May 1987; PAL: October 1989
- Genre: Action
- Mode: Single-player

Ghostbusters is a video game by Activision based on the the 1984 film of the same name. Designed by David Crane, it was released for several home computer platforms in 1984, and later for consoles, including the Atari 2600, Master System and Nintendo Entertainment System. The primary target was the Commodore 64 and the programmer for the initial version of the game was Adam Bellin. All versions of the game were released in the USA except for the Amstrad CPC and ZX Spectrum versions, which were released only in Europe, and the MSX version, which was released only in Europe, South America, and Japan.

In 1984, after the film Ghostbusters had been launched, John Dolgen VP of Business Development at Columbia Pictures approached Activision International president Gregory Fischbach and offered to license the game rights to Activision without specific rules or requests for the design or content of the game, only stipulating that it was to be finished as quickly as possible in order to be released while the movie was at peak popularity. Activision was forced to complete the programming work in only six weeks in contrast to their usual several months of development time for a game. Activision had at the time a rough concept for a driving/maze game to be called "Car Wars", and it was decided to build the Ghostbusters game from it. Both the movie and the game proved to be huge successes with the game selling over two million copies by 1989.

== Gameplay ==
The city grid (C64)

The player sets up a Ghostbusters franchise in a city whose psychokinetic (PK) energy levels have begun to rise. At the start of the game, the player is given a set amount of money and must use it to buy a vehicle and equipment for detecting and catching ghosts. They must then move through a grid representing the city, with flashing red blocks indicating sites of ghost activity.

When the player moves to a flashing block, the game shifts to an overhead street view and they must drive to the site, attempting to vacuum up stray ghosts if the vehicle is equipped to do so. Upon reaching the site, the player must maneuver two Ghostbusters to guide a Slimer ghost into position to be drawn into a trap. Successfully doing so awards money, but each failure causes the PK energy level to jump and incapacitates one of the player's three team member characters.

The player must return to the Ghostbusters headquarters at intervals to empty the traps and/or revive any incapacitated team members. As the game progresses, the player must also keep free-roaming ghosts from reaching the temple of Zuul for as long as possible; each one that does so adds to the PK energy level. The ghosts occasionally merge to form the Stay Puft Marshmallow Man, who will attempt to trample a city block. Stopping such an attack earns a bonus, but each failure to do so deducts money.

If the player has not earned more money than the total spent on equipment when the PK energy level reaches its maximum of 9999, the game ends immediately. Otherwise, the player must guide at least two Ghostbusters past Mr. Stay Puft in order to destroy the temple of Zuul. The game ends afterward, with the player earning a reward if successful.

The player is given an account number upon successfully completing the game. Entering this number at the initial screen allows the player to start a New Game Plus with the cash balance from the end of the previous game, enabling the purchase of more expensive equipment.

== Development ==
Prior to Ghostbusters, David Crane was one of the co-founders of Activision, and became a star at the company with games like Pitfall!. The film was still in production when game development began. Although Activision had avoided licensed games, Tom Lopez, Vice President of product development, acquired the license for Ghostbusters. Lopez went to the game design group saying the game would have to be made in six weeks, opposed to the normal nine months.

Crane had been building his own game titled Car Wars which already featured resource-allocation segments where players could buy different armaments' for their cars based on money the earned on levels. Columbia Pictures had no specific suggestion of what the game should be, but provided the film's script and some story boards. Crane applied content from the film into the game, replacing guns, missiles and rocket launchers with more appropriate weapons that the Ghostbusters would use.

Unlike Crane's earlier games which were predominantly developed by himself, Ghostbusters was made by a larger game design team, including game art made by Hilary Mills, sound effects and music by Russell Lieblich, and an intro sequence developed by Garry Kitchen, Dan Kitchen and Alex Demeo of Activision's East coast division. Crane would later explain that his philosophy on creating a game on a licensed property was a game that would work within the theme of the license and to avoid making a game that borrows the look and feel of the original work, and thus applied this to turning Car Wars into Ghostbusters.

The next weeks had the team working around the clock. Graphics in the game were developed by character artist Hillary Mills after Crane suggested he needed a variety of images, from animals, insects and treasures, and it took a long time to get ghosts that properly resembled ghosts on an 8-bit system. Midway through development, Crane felt it was important to add digitized speech to the game and decided to add quotes from the film together with a crowd chanting "Ghostbusters!" to capture the spirit of the film. Crane does not recall who did the digitized voice in the Ghostbusters game, but had vague memories of walking down the hall from his office getting five or six people to all yell "Ghostbusters!" The music in the game was developed by Russell Lieblich, based on Ray Parker, Jr.'s "Ghostbusters" theme, and is accompanied by the lyrics to the song in the game. Crane passed the task of creating a bouncing ball sing-a-long to Garry Kitchen and his game designers, which was added to the game at the very last minute. Crane also wanted to have a different victory screen. Crane said "I expected players to be disappointed with it. Sadly, to really beef that one sequence would have taken memory and artists time away from the main game." The game initially was going to have more elements such as when capturing ghosts, different enemies would show up with different solutions on how to deal with them. The game would also have had more accessories for the vehicle.

Crane recalled that it would have been a better game with more development time, but also that it would then not have been such a financial success. Crane spent most of the time ensuring the game had a proper beginning, middle and end and, during final development, predominantly focused on fixing bugs. Crane said, as he does with all his games, he "spent every hour that the schedule allowed tweaking the game, and it came out OK in the end. I could have done a lot more, but in the final analysis it seems to have been enough."

=== Ports ===
In 1985, the game was ported to various other systems with little input from Crane. He stated that "By the time a game is being ported to other platforms, the designer of the original game has long since moved on to another original project. This is exactly what happened with Ghostbusters." In 1985, versions for the Amstrad CPC, ZX Spectrum, MSX, Atari 2600, and Atari 8-bit computers were released. In a retrospective overview of Edge, the publication stated that most ports had a "patchy nature". Certain elements of the game are lost in later ports while others add elements. These include the Master System version which adds on-foot shooting gallery sequences and loses some animations, while the Nintendo Entertainment System version had a different ending and was described by Edge as having "graphics so primitive it becomes hard to follow most of what's going on."

== Reception ==
=== Critical response ===
Reception

Review scores
Publication	Score		
Publication	Atari 2600	Master System	ZX
Crash			60%
Computer and Video Games	84%	89%	33/40
Sinclair User			7/10
Your Sinclair			8/10
Home Computing Weekly			5/5
Sinclair Programs			40%
ZX Computing			6/10

Antic in May 1985 called Ghostbusters for Atari 8-bit fun to play, describing it as the first adaptation to capture the feel and theme of the movie on which it is based. Ahoy! stated that the Commodore 64 version "incorporates a surprising number of elements" from the film, with audio even better than the "excellent visuals".

From retrospective reviews, Edge in 2007 called Ghostbusters "dauntingly good", noting that despite the action sequences expected of a licensed title, the game was a "polished, intelligently-paced strategic business simulation". Retro Gamer discussed the original game stating that it remained "an enjoyable (if aged) title to play."

Reflecting on the game in 2006, Crane said "The game was a good one, but not my best work ever." Ghostbusters actor Ernie Hudson said that his kids hated the Commodore 64 version of the game, believing that it "sucked." The NES port and its gameplay were negatively received.

=== Sales ===
Mat Allen of Retro Gamer described Ghostbusters as a massive financial success on the Commodore 64. Ghostbusters topped the monthly UK software sales charts for three months in early 1985, from January to March. Released before the film in the UK, it went on to be the UK's fourth best-selling home video game of 1985.

In 1985, it and The Print Shop were reportedly the two most widely pirated Commodore 64 programs. In II Computing, Michael Ciraolo applied Billboard's charts and the market share of certain computers to compile the most Apple II games by October 1985. Ghostbusters placed at 8th. By late 1987, it was still Activision's best-selling Commodore game.

The Amstrad CPC and ZX Spectrum versions of the game were included on the 1986 compilation They Sold a Million 3, along with Fighter Pilot, Rambo and Kung-Fu Master. The game was also released on The Story So Far Volume IV in December 1989. It knocked Daley Thompson's Decathlon from the top of the UK sales chart.

In 1988, Mastertronic re-released the Amstrad, Commodore, Spectrum and Atari computer versions of Ghostbusters on their Ricochet label and it went on to become their most successful budget re-release, selling over 450,000 copies.

== Legacy ==
Several film and television licensed games came out for the Commodore 64 following the release of Ghostbusters. A retrospective review noted releases like Street Hawk, Knight Rider, Highlander and Miami Vice were described by Retro Gamer as "cynical cash-ins" having little to do with their respective shows. Crane commented on this stating there is usually no interest in licensing a film until the film itself would generate some actual excitement, and once the film releases, its excitement can only last so long and the all these tasks have to be fit into a compressed schedule, in which a game's programming and design suffers.
