= Frostbite (video game) =

1983 video game

- Developer: Activision
- Publisher: Activision
- Designer: Steve Cartwright
- Platform: Atari 2600
- Release: October 1983
- Genre: Action
- Modes: Single-player, multiplayer

Frostbite is a 1983 action game designed by Steve Cartwright for the Atari 2600 and published by Activision in 1983. The player controls Frostbite Bailey, who must hop across four rows of ice floes, changing them from white to blue, while avoiding the water and hazardous natural elements such polar bears and snow geese.

Cartwright had developed several games while at Activision, including Megamania, and Seaquest. Frostbite was the last game he made for the Atari 2600. While critics compared the game to Frogger and Q*bert, Cartwright said he based it only on Frogger and had not played Q*bert before completing the game.

Upon its release, some critics complimented the game as a novel twist on Frogger and Q*bert, while others lamented that the game seemed out-of-date with its simple gameplay and was not as visually appealing as other Activision titles. Retro Gamer included the game in their list of the top 25 games for the Atari 2600 in 2008.

== Gameplay ==
Frostbite Bailey floating on ice. The gray bar is the base of a new igloo.

The goal of Frosbite is to help Frostbite Bailey build igloos by controlling him while jumping across ice floes to collect ice and avoiding falling into the sea. The player must also keep Frostbite clear of hazardous killer clams, snow geese, king crabs, and polar bears. Ice is collected by leaping onto an ice floe that is white, causing it to turn blue. Fish regularly swim by the ice floes and can be collected for 200 bonus points. Each round has a temperature scale acting as an in-game timer. If the timer runs out, the player loses a life. After an igloo is built and entered, the remaining temperature and the number of rounds that have passed give the player bonus points.

The player begins with an active playable character and has three lives in reserve. Every 5,000 points earns an extra life. The difficulty switches select either Regular mode or Advanced mode. Regular mode starts at level one, while advanced mode starts at level five. The other setting adjusts if the game is a single-player or two-player game. The two-player game has players alternating turns.

== Development ==
Steve Cartwright developed Frostbite for Activision. The game's working title was Iceman. Cartwright joined the company in 1982 and in that year released two games for the system: Barnstorming and Megamania. In 1983, he released three games including Plaque Attack, Seaquest and Frostbite.

Darran Jones in Retro Gamer wrote that many people believed the game was based on Q*bert (1982), while Cartwright said he recalled the game being influenced by Frogger (1981) and that he had not played Q*bert until after Frostbite was completed. The game's arctic theme was influenced by the limitations of the Atari 2600 system. Cartwright's initial idea involved jumping over rocks in a lava-filled area, which was abandoned as Cartwright believed that blue and white colors worked better on the system. Cartwright noted difficulty with bringing his ideas to life on the system as well, noting that Frostbite had difficulty with its memory issues and screen timing, which he described as "something that is extremely easy with higher programming languages, but presented real problems when writing code in 6502." One specific issue Cartwright encountered was preventing players from going back and forth between two ice floes by making it so you were unable to continue to add blocks to the igloo until all the ice floes were the same color.

Cartwright recalled that Frostbite was one of the games they had to test the most before releasing, noting that "The speed of the game increased to the point where objects moved and wrapped around the screen so fast that they appeared at times to be moving backwards - kind of like those old Westerns where the wagon wheels appears to be turning slowly in the opposite direction."

== Release and reception ==
Frostbite was released for the Atari 2600 in October 1983. Frostbite has been re-released in the compilation release Activision Anthology (2002).

From contemporary reviews, The Video Game Update found the graphics "bright and colorful", but not as impressive as the usual Activision games. They concluded the game was "cute, but kind of dumb [...] however we found it very difficult to stop playing once we got going" stating that it had to be played several times to be appreciated. Dan Gutman included the game in his 1984 overview of what he felt were video game clone of Q*bert, but generally praised the game stating that it "shows how you can take an idea and use it creatively without ripping off the original game." In Electronic Fun with Computers & Games, Randi Hacker also compared the game to Q*bert and Frogger, but felt it gameplay variation gave the game its own flavor.

E.C. Meade and Jim Clark reviewed the game in Video and Computer Gaming Illustrated. While Clark noted the game was similar in gameplay to both Frogger and Q*bert, it was still appealing and complimented on the atmosphere of the game noting that the design "is so well done, you feel the chill." Meade found the game lacked distinctiveness with its hybrid of Q*bert and Frogger, and that it was not as fast-paced as either Enduro (1983) or River Raid (1982) ultimately stating that Activision was no longer evolving and this was "another step in the company's surprising decline." Dan Persons of Video Games magazine also found that in comparison to more complicated games such as Robot Tank (1983) and Enduro (1983) Frostbite felt like a throwback and that its gameplay became monotonous after a while.

From retrospective reviews, Brett Weiss wrote in his book Classic Home Video Games 1972-1984 (2007), that the game resembled the gameplay of Q*Bert and Frogger while finding its arcade-like action very satisfying. He praised the games fun and challenge while noting that the jumping sound effect grew tiresome, and that it was less colorful than the average Activision title. In 2008, Darran Jones and Stuart Hunt of Retro Gamer included Frostbite in their list of the Top 25 Atari 2600 Games at number 22. They stated that it would be wrong to call the game a Frogger ripoff and that anyone who had not spent any real time with the game, noting the new mechanics, tight controls, and that it emulates older arcade hits proving to be extremely addictive.

== See also ==
- List of Atari 2600 games
- List of Activision games: 1980–1999
