= Eternal Champions =

1993 video game

- Cover art by Julie Bell, featuring (back to front) Xavier, Jetta, Blade, and Slash
- Developer: Sega Interactive Development Division
- Publisher: Sega
- Director: Christopher Warner
- Producer: Mark Nausha
- Designer: Michael Latham
- Programmer: John Kuwaye
- Artist: Albert Co
- Composers: Joe Delia; John Hart; Jeff Marsh; Adrian van Velssen; Andy Armer
- Series: Eternal Champions
- Platform: Sega Genesis
- Release: NA: December 1993; PAL: January 28, 1994; JP: February 18, 1994
- Genre: Fighting
- Modes: Single-player, multiplayer

Eternal Champions is a 1993 fighting game developed and published by Sega for the Sega Genesis. It features fighters pulled from throughout time competing in a tournament to win the chance to avert their deaths.

Sega released Eternal Champions following the success of Street Fighter II (1991) and Mortal Kombat (1992). The game tried to set itself apart with features such as a heavier emphasis on its story, unique gameplay mechanics, and elaborate finishing moves called "Overkills".

A second entry in the series, Eternal Champions: Challenge from the Dark Side (1995), was released for the Sega CD. The game also spawned two spin-off games, Chicago Syndicate (1995) and X-Perts (1996).

== Gameplay ==
In-game screenshot showing characters Shadow (left) and Trident (right)

Like many fighting games of the time such as Street Fighter II (1991), Eternal Champions features six attack buttons, consisting of three punches and three kicks. The game is optimized for use with six-button controllers or the Sega Activator, while players using the standard Genesis controller, which has only three action buttons, must press the start button during gameplay to toggle the action buttons between punches and kicks. The joystick or D-pad is used to move, jump and crouch.

Each character has their own unique special attacks that are performed by either pressing multiple buttons together, or holding back or down to charge and then pressing towards or up together with a button. In addition to dealing damage, special attacks may have other properties, such as reflecting projectiles, affecting opponents' controls, or applying a status effect to either character. Performing special moves drains an "inner strength" meter, which gradually recharges; characters can also taunt to reduce their opponent's meter. The game also features stage-specific finishing moves called Overkills performed by defeating an opponent such that they fall upon a certain area of ground. If they land in the right spot, the life bars disappear and some element of the background kills them.

Available gameplay modes include a standard arcade ladder, a practice mode for single battles against a CPU opponent or second player, the "Battle Room" which features fights with additional hazards, and a training mode with several mini-games designed to teach the player how to play the game.

== Plot ==
An omniscient being known as the Eternal Champion predicts that mankind will soon fade from existence due to the untimely and unjust deaths of key individuals throughout history who were destined for greatness. Seeking to restore balance to the world, the Eternal Champion gathers these souls from time moments before their deaths. The Eternal Champion only has enough power to restore life to one of these individuals, so he organizes and holds a fighting tournament between them, where the victor will be able to regain their life and change their fate while bringing balance to the universe, whilst the losers will be forced to die just as history recorded.

=== Characters ===
The game features nine playable characters, with the Eternal Champion appearing as a non-playable boss character.. Beating arcade mode with any character reveals an epilogue detailing how the winner avoided their original death and then went on to make a positive change in their era.

- Blade – Jonathan Blade is a Syrian bounty hunter from 2030 A.D. He was hired by the government to help track down a terrorist that had stolen a lethal virus. Blade was about to apprehend the terrorist when special forces agents opened fire on both of them, accidentally causing the terrorist to drop the vial and release the virus.
- Jetta – Jetta Maxx is a member of the Russian aristocracy from 1899 A.D. She was working undercover as a circus acrobat at the time of her death. A boxer revolutionary tampered with her tightrope equipment ahead of a major show in China. She fell to her death in front of the live crowd. When her true identity was revealed, it heightened tensions between both nations.
- Larcen – Larcen Tyler is a former cat-burglar from 1920s Chicago. He used to do jobs for a local crime boss. He was hired to plant evidence in the hospital room of a rival mafia leader. It was only when he got to the location that he discovered that his real target was the Chief of Police, and the "evidence" was actually a bomb. Larcen was killed in the explosion that destroyed most of the hospital.
- Midknight – Midknight is a vampire-like mutant hiding in Vietnam. In his former life, he was the noted British biochemist Mitchell Middleton Knight. He was hired by U.S. forces to spike water supplies during the Vietnam War in 1967. He became exposed to the chemical, and was mutated like every other victim. He was killed by a vampire hunter hired by the government before he could create a cure.
- R.A.X. – R.A.X. Coswell is an American cyber-kickboxer from 2345 A.D. His trainer programmed a virus into his R.A.X. exoskeleton software to ensure he lost an important match. Coswell died during the match as a result.
- Shadow – Shadow Yamato is a ninja assassin from modern-day (1993 A.D) Japan. She was thrown off the top of her employer’s skyscraper before she could publicly expose the murderous actions of her syndicate.
- Slash – Slash is a prehistoric hunter from 50,000 B.C. He was sentenced to death by the elders of his tribe, who feared that Slash would use his high intelligence to usurp them.
- Trident – Trident is an artificial being created by the Atlanteans from 110 B.C. He was killed by a rival before he could compete in the final match of a gladiator tournament. As a consequence, the Roman Empire banished his race to the sea, where they were eventually wiped out.
- Xavier – Xavier Pendragon is an alchemy student from 1692 A.D. He was executed under a false charge of witchcraft during the Salem witch trials.

== Development and release ==
Though only credited within the game under "special thanks", comic book artist Ernie Chan created much of the character designs and art for the game.

The game first released in North America in December 1993. Releases in Europe and Japan followed on January 28 and February 18, 1994, respectively. The cartridge was one of only a few games designed for compatibility with the Sega Activator, an infrared ring controller that players stood in and punched and kicked in order to make the characters perform different combat movements. The player using the Activator was given an advantage of receiving 50% less and inflicting 50% more damage than the player using a regular controller.

The game was promoted with a "Sega Eternal Champions Cherry" Slurpee flavor in 7-Eleven stores throughout the United States. It came in cups with pictures of the characters on them, and the bottom of the cup contained a temporary tattoo. There was also a cash and rebate promotion in July 1993 that was featured on MTV. Electronic Gaming Monthly sponsored Eternal Champions tournaments in the United States as part of a roaming video game show. An LCD game, Eternal Champions: Special Moves Edition was released by Tiger Electronics in 1994.

=== Re-releases ===
Eternal Champions was re-released through the Wii's Virtual Console download service on November 20, 2007, in Japan; on December 3, 2007, in North America; and on February 15, 2008, in Europe. It has also beein included in Sega Genesis compilations, including Sega Genesis Classics (2010) and the Sega Genesis Mini microconsole released in 2019.

== Reception ==
Reception

Aggregate score
Aggregator	Score
GameRankings	62.5%

Review scores
Publication	Score
Electronic Gaming Monthly	8/10, 7/10, 5/10, 5/10
IGN	8/10

Upon its release, Eternal Champions received mixed critical reception, and held an average aggregate score of 62.5% at GameRankings at the time of the site's 2019 closure. Mean Machines Sega gave it a score of 97%, calling it "at least as good" as Street Fighter II, and Electronic Games gave it a 91%. The four reviewers of Electronic Gaming Monthly were divided, with two of them recommending the game based on the large number of options and the selection of moves, while the other two described it as a major disappointment, citing mediocre graphics and unexciting characters.

In the United Kingdom, it was the top-selling Mega Drive game in February 1994. It sold over 1.6 million copies.

In 2008, IGN gave the Virtual Console release a score of 6 out of 10, criticizing its difficult to learn play mechanics while praising the game's story, training mode, and "inner strength meter". IGN concluded "it's not likely that many players who've never previously heard of the game will have the patience to spend that much time getting to know it."

In 1995, Mega Zone included the game on their Top 50 Games In History summarizing: "Huge characters and heaps of playability put it up there with MKII and SFII." In 2006, IGN ranked the game's finishing moves ("Overkills") as the best gore effects in video game history. In 2011, Complex included it on the list of ten "most blatant Mortal Kombat ripoffs" but added that it was "one of the more successful faux-MK fighters" and "the only thing that sucked was the difficulty." Complex also featured it on the 2012 list of the 25 Sega franchises they would like to see revisited and ranked it as the 24th best 2D fighting game of all time in 2013.

== Legacy ==
A second Eternal Champions game, Eternal Champions: Challenge from the Dark Side, was released for the Sega CD in 1995. Described as both a sequel and an update of the original, it includes all of the characters and stages from Eternal Champions, along with several new ones. Challenge from the Dark Side features updated game mechanics, including a greater focus on performing combos, reducing the amount of meter used by special attacks and adding new Skill Moves that used no meter. New types of more violent finishing moves were also introduced. According to an interview with Michael Latham, there were also plans for a Game Gear version of the original game, but this never materialized.

Two spin-offs of Eternal Champions were released, each set in alternate universes where one of the characters survived. The first game is Chicago Syndicate, an action game released for the Game Gear handheld console in 1995. The game follows Larcen Tyler seeking revenge on the Chicago mafia. The second game, X-Perts, is a side-scrolling beat'em up released in 1996 for the Genesis. It follows Shadow Yamoto leading a vigilante group against a terrorist organization.

A third fighting game, Eternal Champions: The Final Chapter, was advertised for the Sega Saturn, but the game was canceled shortly after beginning development in order to push the Virtua Fighter series in the United States. According to an interview with Michael Latham, this decision was made by Sega of Japan: "Sega of Japan felt that Eternal Champions was keeping Virtua Fighter from being more successful in the US and that it would be better if the company focused on only one franchise... and as Sega is a Japanese company, the Japan side won. It was a crushing blow and was the only time in working nearly a decade at Sega I considered quitting. I mainly stayed with the hope to change that decision, but sadly never could. Even when we did the NetFighter project for Heat.net, we weren't able to use the Eternal characters as a hidden bonus. From Japan's view, the game never existed, in spite of its stellar sales and even offers to do comic books and a cartoon around it."

=== In other media ===
Two gamebooks, titled Eternal Champions Adventure Gamebook: The Cyber Warriors and Eternal Champions Adventure Gamebook 2: Citadel of Chaos, were released by Puffin Books. In the books, the reader controls the newest Champion and travels through time helping the game characters battle a megalomaniacal artificial intelligence called the Overlord, who is bent on replacing them with duplicates so that they cannot change the course of history for the better. Both books were released as sticker albums by Panini in 1993.

Eternal Champions was adapted by the UK Sega Magazine's Sonic the Comic in a stand-alone magazine Eternal Champions Special, which introduced the main characters and served as an adaptation to the game. The characters also appeared in two stories in the main Sonic the Comic series, first in Eternal Champions (issues 19–24) and then Larson's [sic] Revenge (issues 37–40) which dealt with Larcen Tyler returning to 1920s Chicago and working with Shadow Yamoto to take down the crime boss who killed him. Eternal Champions was the only non-Sonic-related Sega property to receive a special issue of Sonic the Comic.

On August 16, 2024, Sega and Skydance Media announced a film adaptation of the game, set to be written by Derek Connolly.
