= Peter Oliphant =

American actor and video game designer (1950–2023)

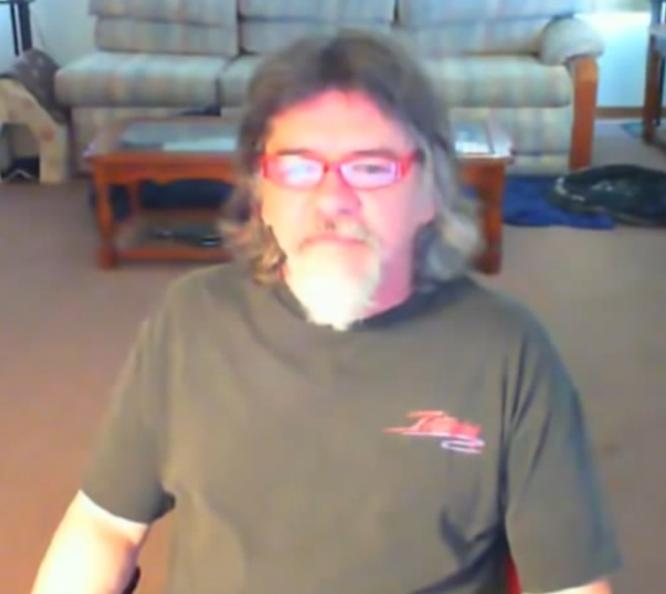
- Oliphant in 2012
- Born: September 1, 1950; United States
- Died: May 24, 2023 (aged 72)
- Occupations: Actor, video game designer
- Years active: 1960–2000

Peter Oliphant (September 1, 1950 – May 24, 2023) was an American actor and video game designer. He was best known for playing Freddie Helper on the American sitcom television series The Dick Van Dyke Show. He later worked as a video game designer, programmer, and producer. Some games he worked on included Stonekeep and Lexi-Cross. He worked at Mattel Electronics creating handheld electronic games.

Oliphant died on May 24, 2023, at the age of 72.
