= System 15000 =

1984 video game

- Developer: A.V.S.
- Publisher: Craig Communications
- Designer: Lee Kristofferson
- Platforms: Commodore 64, ZX Spectrum, BBC Micro
- Release: 1984
- Genre: Puzzle
- Mode: Single-player

System 15000 is a puzzle video game designed and programmed by Lee Kristofferson (real name John Wagstaff) in assembly language for the Commodore 64. It was published in 1984 by Craig Communications. Version were later released for the ZX Spectrum and BBC Micro, both written in BASIC. System 15000 was the first game to simulate computer hacking.

A sequel was planned by Lee Kristofferson but never released.

== Plot ==
The game box includes a letter which provides background information to establish the premise of the game. Written to the main character from the perspective of a friend "Mike", it outlines how (a presumed mutual friend) Richard's company, Comdata, has had $1.5 million stolen by a rival company named Realco. Furthermore, the police are unable to retrieve the money, so the player is required to hack into a computer system and retrieve the funds. The letter provides a single phone number and entry code, part of the game's simulation of dialing into databases and bulletin boards. The player has to figure out how to get into the proper database to take back the cash.

== See also ==
- Hacker
- Neuromancer
