= Park Patrol =

1984 video game

- Developer: Activision
- Publisher: Firebird Software
- Designer: Tony Ngo
- Composers: Tony Ngo; Russell Lieblich
- Platforms: Commodore 64, Amstrad CPC, ZX Spectrum
- Release: NA: 1984; EU: 1984
- Genre: Action
- Mode: Single-player

Park Patrol is a 1984 action video game developed by Activision, designed by Tony Ngo, and published by Firebird Software for the Commodore 64. It was later released for the Amstrad CPC and ZX Spectrum. The player controls a park ranger, of either male or female gender, with the goal to tidy up trash from the waters of the lake and the shoreline.

== Gameplay ==
The ranger can walk on the shore or use an inflatable dinghy with an outboard motor to go into the water.

Turtles kill on contact. If one falls into the water it can be rescued for points but turn into a fast-moving green turtle if left for too long.

Snakes lurk in the water and can puncture the dinghy. They can be scared away temporarily by dropping snake repellent (at the cost of energy).

Swimmers can be rescued when calling for help.

Ants steel food from the hut, which can be recovered by bumping into them from the side (and killed by knocking them into the water).

On the shore is the ranger's hut, which contains food to top up energy. A plant near the hut grows every time the ranger walks into it. When it flowers, the ranger gets a short period of immunity.

By approaching at the right angle, the ranger can jump out of the dinghy and land on floating logs, starting a logrolling mini-game.

Once all the litter is collected, a bonus is awarded based on energy remaining.

== Reception ==
Reception

Review scores
Publication	Score
Zzap!64	94/100
Computer Gamer	78/100
Happy Computer	71
