= H.E.R.O. (video game) =

1984 video game

- Atari 2600 cover art
- Developer: Activision
- Publisher: Activision
- Designer: John Van Ryzin
- Platforms: Atari 2600, Apple II, Atari 5200, Atari 8-bit, ColecoVision, Commodore 64, MSX, SG-1000, ZX Spectrum
- Release: March 30, 1984: Atari 2600; March 30, 1984; ColecoVision; August 1984; Commodore 64; 1984; Atari 5200; 1984
- Genre: Platformer

H.E.R.O. (standing for Helicopter Emergency Rescue Operation) is a video game designed by John Van Ryzin and published by Activision for the Atari 2600 in March 1984. The game has players control Roderick Hero who traverses a mineshaft avoiding enemies and hazards to rescue trapped miners. He travels through the mines equipped with a hoverpack that allows him to traverse the game levels as well as bombs and laser that let him destroy walls and defeat enemies respectively.

Van Ryzin initially began working at Activision at their New Jersey offices to make a game titled Cosmic Commuter. Initial tests of the game had playtesters comment it was not fun enough, leading Van Ryzin to develop a new game influenced by comic book superheroes that would become H.E.R.O.. Following its release, the game was ported to the Atari 5200, Colecovision, and SG-1000 consoles and the Apple II, Commodore 64, MSX, ZX Spectrum and Atari 8-bit computers.

The game received positive reviews from publications such as The Video Game Update, Zzap!64 and Retro Gamer. Jeremy Parish said the game was an important game in the development of the platformer game genre as it allowed players to move freely in all directions instead of being forced into climbing ladders or jumping over obstacles which would be seen in later games like Bionic Commando (1988) and Bangai-O (1999).

== Gameplay ==
In Mount Leone, volcanic activity has trapped miners. This leads to Roderick Hero to traverse the mineshafts in order to rescue the workers. The player can set the difficulty through the game select switch with the higher numbers having the players start at later levels in the game. For example, Game number one starts at level one, and game 2 starts at level 5. If the player chooses game level 5, they start at level 17 with all the levels after being random.

The player controls Roderick. Roderick can fly up left or right and hover on the spot. He is equipped with a microlaser beam helmet which allows him to fight most enemies and destroy some walls. Roderick is equipped with six sticks of dynamite per level, which can destroy some walls. Additionally the fuse from lit dynamite will illuminate a dark screen until it detonates. Other hazards include lanterns that when touched will go out, causing the screen to go dark.

Players can lose lives by having their power gauge deplete, or interacting with one of the hazards such as spiders, snakes and walls that glow red that contain magma deposits. The power gauge begins depleting as soon as the player begins moving in a level. The player begins the game with four lives with the game ending when the player runs out of them.

Completing a level, shooting enemies, dynamiting a wall and the amount of dynamite and energy left at the end of the level gives the player points. Every twenty-thousand points earns the player an extra life. If the player reaches one million points, the rescue operation ceases.

== Development ==
H.E.R.O. was developed by John Van Ryzin for the video game company Activision. Van Ryzin was an intern at Wickstead Design, developing electronic toys and gadgets where he met Garry Kitchen. Kitchen connected Van Ryzin into video game development for Apple II computers. Kitchen joined Activision in June 1982. As Activision grew as a company, it began setting up satellite offices outside of its main California location. The first of these areas was in a New Jersey office, which was set-up for Kitchen and a few other staff members, including Van Ryzin. Van Ryzin began work on a game titled Cosmic Commuter (1985) for nine months which he intended to be his first release for Activision. During early playtests of the game, it was decided that it was not ready for release. Van Ryzin was told it was well done technically, but play testers did not find it fun. This led to Van Ryzin developing his next game which would become H.E.R.O.

During development, the game was known as Heli.The inspiration for the game came from Van Ryzin touring a cave on a weekend trip for the games cavern setting. He was also a fan of comic book superheroes as a child, specifically Superman and his destructive heat-vision, all of which would come into play for the general concept of H.E.R.O. With these concepts, Van Ryzin first coded the figure, cave, and controls then began developing the levels, enemies and features of the cave. Van Ryzin created the art, sound effects and programmed the game in assembly language and developed the game via a PDP-11 computer and a debugging tool. Van Ryzin recalled that this was all "state of the art, because before that I wrote games on the Apple II with no debugging tools at all." H.E.R.O. was made for an eight-kilobyte rom cartridge.

Van Ryzin began adding more elements into the game as he developed it, such as a secondary weapon of dynamite and more enemies in the cave such as snakes hiding in the walls. He later recalled that "The most amazing thing about Activision back then was that we had no deadlines or budgets for games - it was done when it was good." Van Ryzin used the time to perfect the controls of the helicopter pack and adjust the difficulty as levels progressed. He designed the middle levels first, then made adjustments from those for the later harder levels and earlier easier levels. He also discussed with other designers in the New Jersey office which he said he received great feedback from. Among the suggestions from his co-workers, were ideas such as the lamps breaking and the lights going out while exploring the cave. Further elements were added into the game as it continued, namely the raft and tentacled monster. Following approval from the staff in California, the staff at that location developed the manual, marketing and packaging for the game.

== Release ==
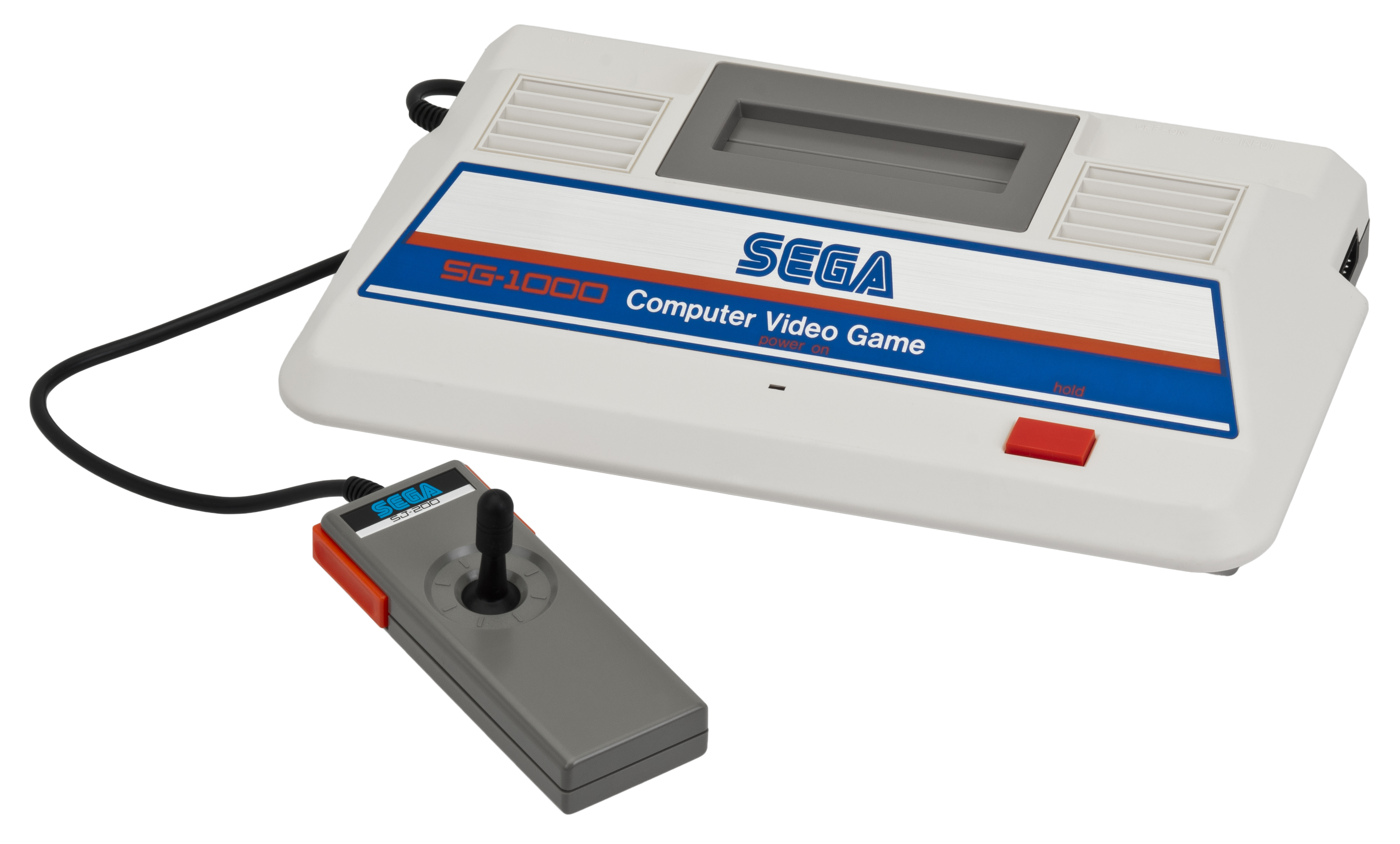
Most ports of H.E.R.O. updated the graphics and colors displayed, but the version for the SG-1000 console (pictured) added new elements such as music and new traps to the game.

H.E.R.O. was first released on March 30, 1984. H.E.R.O. was released for ColecoVision in August 1984 while the Commodore 64 and Atari 5200 in the third quarter of 1984. The game was ported the Atari 5200, Colecovision, and SG-1000 consoles and to home computers such as the Apple II, Commodore 64, MSX, ZX Spectrum, and Atari's 8-bit computers. The other versions mostly vary with respect to colors and graphic detail, while the SG-1000 version adds music, new traps such as stalactites, lava geysers and featured female miners. Van Ryzen did not code any of these versions, but was asked to approve of them and suggested ideas on the graphics. Van Ryzen suggested for the packaging of the later games to make the character more of a super hero, as on the original game the cover art had him looking "kind of goofy" according to Van Ryzen.

The Atari 2600 version of the game has been re-released on various compilation titles. These include Activision Classics (1998) for the PlayStation and the Activision Anthology for the PlayStation 2, Game Boy Advance, iOS and Android based smart phones. H.E.R.O. and various other Atari 2600 Activision games are included as secret game within Call of Duty: Black Ops II (2012). Atari teased a large announcement on August 20, 2026 which was revealed a re-release of several Activision games for the Atari 2600. This included H.E.R.O. set for a 2027 release.

== Reception ==
Reception

Review scores
Publication	Score		
Publication	Atari 2600	C64	ColecoVision
AllGame			3.5/5
Computer and Video Games	93%		94%
Personal Computer Games		8/10	
Zzap!64		86%	

Reviewing the Atari 2600 game, A reviewer in The Video Game Update noted the game was challenging, writing that most players will accidentally blow themselves up with the dynamite charges before getting used to avoid them. The review went on to praise the games graphics, noting that they were similar to those of Pitfall II: Lost Caverns particularly liking how the recued person waves at the player when rescued. A review in the British magazine TV Gamer gave it straight four out of five scores for value, graphics, sound and gameplay calling it "an excellent game." Lou Hudson of the Fort Worth Star-Telegram opined that the game "isn't a bad action game, but appears to be out of a past generation. A year ago, it would have been excellent. This year, it's a little blah."

In a review of the ColecoVision port, Electronic Games wrote, "Activision has wisely used the superior graphics of the CV units to provide a breathtaking underground panorama," and concluded, "Congrats Activision! H.E.R.O. is a real champion." Reviewing the game for the Commodore 64, Bob Wade of Personal Computer Games noted it was far more action-oriented than any of the mining-themed games as of late, while his fellow critics Chris Anderson and Peter Connor stated the game did not have state-of-the-art graphics for the home computer, it was still very enjoyable and challenging. In the June 1987 issue of Zzap!64, Julian Rignall wrote—of the C64 version—"HERO looks awful, sounds terrible but plays absolutely beautifully." The Japanese magazine Technopolis reviewed the game for the MSX, declaring it to be a really fun game that fit the system perfectly. The review specifically praised the narrative, play control only finding the characters not strong.

In his series in Computer Gaming World on the history of Activision in 1987, Charles Ardai said that titles like H.E.R.O. and Park Patrol (1984) "don't exactly encourage kudos, but at least, they are unique." From a retrospective review in Computer and Video Games, H.E.R.O. was praised for its colorful graphics while concluding that the addictive gameplay made it one of the best games for the Atari 2600. Brett Weiss included the game in his book on the top 100 console games released between 1977 and 1987. Weiss wrote that the game made you "feel like a real adventure hero [...] a rare feat in the pre-NES era of gaming." In their list of the top 25 Atari 2600 games, Stuart Hunt and Darran Jones of Retro Gamer listed H.E.R.O. as the second best Atari 2600 game. The writers declared that the game mix of action and exploration made it "a truly outstanding release" that was "beautifully designed, with bold detailed visuals and sound effects."

== Legacy ==
Gameplay of H.E.R.O. for the Atari 2600

Van Ryzen commented that the game was not a great success for him, saying that "Unfortunately the game market crashed at the time, so I did not get the financial rewards I might have gotten. But hey, how many people can say 'I designed a top ten videogame!' That is priceless." Unofficial fan-made versions of the game were produced decades after the lifetime of the game, such as a version in 2005 for the Amstrad CPC. Decades after the games initial release, Van Ryzin created a spiritual successor to the game for the Atari 2600 titled Alien Abduction!. The game was released digitally for the Atari VCS console in 2023. It received a physical cartridge release for the Atari 2600 on June 15th, 2024.

Writing for USgamer, Jeremy Parish said the game was important in the development of the platformer game genre. He said that H.E.R.O. allowed players to move freely in all directions instead of being forced into climbing ladders or jumping over obstacles seen in games like Donkey Kong (1981) or Pitfall! (1982). Parish wrote that this form of gameplay would be seen in later games such as Bionic Commando (1988) and Bangai-O (1999) which owed "a debt of gratitude to Activision's classic (if largely forgotten) platformer-that-wasn't."

== See also ==
- List of Atari 2600 games
- List of Activision games: 1980–1999
