= Grand Prix (video game) =

1982 video game

- Developer(s): Activision
- Publisher(s): Activision
- Designer(s): David Crane
- Programmer(s): David Crane
- Platform(s): Atari 2600
- Release: NA: March 1982
- Genre(s): Racing
- Mode(s): Single-player

Grand Prix is a racing video game designed and programmed by David Crane for the Atari 2600 and published by Activision in 1982. The player races along a horizontally scrolling track, viewed from a top down perspective, while avoiding other cars. The goal is to get the fastest possible time. There are four tracks which are completely straight and only differ in length and the number of narrow bridges.

== Gameplay ==
A race in progress

The player drives a Formula One car on one of four race tracks, each of which has a different difficulty level. Difficulty is gauged by the length of the course, the number of cars and oil slicks on the track, and the number of bridges to cross.

The race is viewed from a top-down perspective, and the screen scrolls from right to left. The player's car maneuvers only on a vertical axis, and loses a little speed when it does so. The joystick's button is the throttle: Depressing it accelerates, and releasing it decelerates. Moving the joystick left applies the brake. The transmission audibly shifts as the player's car accelerates and decelerates.

Grand Prix is a time trial, and the competing cars are obstacles rather than competition for the finish line. The player's car can easily outpace the other cars, but if it collides with one, its speed drops lower than that of the impacted car. Driving over an oil slick causes the player's car to skid slightly sideways, but does not slow it down. Once every scale mile, the player crosses a narrow bridge over blue water. Colliding with any wall of the bridge stops the car, and the player must slowly gain speed to continue. A patch of oil slicks precedes a bridge. This both forewarns the player, and presents a hazard while trying to steer onto the bridge. Competing cars do not cross bridges nor the finish line; if they are about to approach either one, they stop suddenly.

=== Tracks ===
Each of the game's four race tracks is a named after a real Formula One circuit: Watkins Glen International, Brands Hatch, Bugatti Circuit, and Circuit de Monaco. All courses are tree-lined straight roads, lacking any curves. The shortest, simplest course is Watkins Glen. Brands Hatch is about twice as long as Watkins Glen, and has one bridge. Le Mans is about three times as long as Watkins Glen, and has two bridges. Monaco is about five times as long as Watkins Glen, and has three bridges.

== Development ==
When David Crane developed a technique for painting large, multicolored sprites on the 2600, he made a color pattern that reminded him of Grand Prix racing stripes. This inspired him to design a Grand Prix racing game to apply his new technique.

== Reception ==
Richard A. Edwards reviewed Grand Prix in The Space Gamer No. 54. Edwards commented that "all in all, the graphics and required skill make Grand Prix a game worth purchasing". Computer and Video Games rated the game 80% in 1989.

== Reviews ==
- JoyStik (Dec, 1982)
- Tilt (Jan, 1983)

== Legacy ==
In 1995, Activision included the game in the anthology Activision's Atari 2600 Action Pack for Windows 95.

== See also ==
- List of Atari 2600 games
- List of Activision games: 1980–1999
- Enduro
