= Chicago Syndicate (video game) =

1995 video game

- Developers: Climax Group; Sega
- Publisher: Sega
- Producer: Jason Lihou
- Designers: Mark Eyles; John Hollis; Andrew Pang; Michael Baxter
- Programmers: Tony Mack; Steve Lamb
- Artists: Thor Hayton; Michael Baxter
- Composer: Matthew Simmonds
- Platform: Game Gear
- Release: NA: 1995
- Genre: Beat 'em up
- Mode: Single-player

Chicago Syndicate is a 1995 beat 'em up video game developed and published by Sega for the Game Gear exclusively in North America. It is a spin-off of Eternal Champions centering on former cat burglar Larcen Tyler.

== Plot ==
The game is set in the 1920s in an alternate reality from the Eternal Champions universe. In this universe, Larcen Tyler found out earlier that the package he was to send to the hospital by Tagilani was a bomb. He disposed of the bomb, resulting in it not killing the police chief of Chicago, people in the hospital, and Larcen himself. Because of this act, Tagliani considers Larcen a traitor and orders all the mobs in Chicago to kill him.

While in hiding, the police order Larcen to become a police informant and ask for Larcen to clean up the streets of Chicago in exchange for information about Tagliani's current whereabouts.

== Reception ==
GamePro gave the game a mostly negative review, remarking that "the slow pace, small sprites, and awkward controls keep your quest dull and frustrating." He also criticized the enemies' lack of aggressiveness. Though he said the graphics are overall decent, he concluded the game to be only for hardcore Eternal Champions fans, giving the game a score of 58 out of 100.
