= Eternal Champions: Challenge from the Dark Side =

1995 video game

Eternal Champions: Challenge From The Dark Side
- North American cover art
- Developer: Sega Interactive Development Division
- Publisher: Sega (Note: Released under the Deep Water brand in North America.)
- Director: Michael Terlecki
- Producers: Michael Latham; John C. Brandstetter; Erik Wahlberg
- Designers: Michael Latham; Erik Wahlberg
- Programmer: John Kuwaye
- Artists: David C. Russ; Albert Co; Francis Co
- Composer: Tristan des Prés
- Platform: Sega CD
- Release: NA: 1995; EU: May 1995
- Genre: Fighting game
- Modes: Single-player, Multiplayer

Eternal Champions: Challenge from the Dark Side (also known as Eternal Champions 2 or Eternal Champions CD) is a fighting video game for the Sega CD. It was published in June 1995 in North America and during the same year in Europe, within the waning days of the platform lifespan.

The game is an update of the Sega Genesis game Eternal Champions. Both games were developed by an internal team at Sega Interactive Development Division and designed by Michael Latham, a developer with Sega of America from their early days.

Eternal Champions: Challenge from the Dark Side includes the nine playable fighters and a non-playable boss from the first game, and adds 13 new playable characters (nine of which are hidden) and a new boss. Also, new moves called "Cinekills" were added, which are essentially fatality scenes rendered in full motion video.

== Gameplay ==
A screenshot of Jetta vs Shadow

Eternal Champions: Challenge from the Dark Side makes most special attacks use less of the special attack meter than in the previous game. There are also some special attacks that do not deplete the special attack meter. Combo attacks are also introduced, and jumping attacks can be linked to ground attacks and most normal attacks can be linked to other normal attacks. Mild "juggle" combos can also be executed by landing an additional hit on an already aerial opponent.

The game also includes three new types of finishing moves. The first is a second "Overkill" in each stage, called "Sudden Death", that can be activated when the victim still has a little life left. The other two, "Vendetta" and "Cinekill", can be performed on a dazed opponent that has 20% or less of their life in the final round only. Sudden Deaths and Vendettas are often exceptionally gory, and the original Overkills were made gorier to match. During Overkills (and Sudden Deaths), the winning fighter is carried off the stage in a flash of light the moment the fateful blow was made. The game retains the stage-specific finishing moves called Overkills from the first Eternal Champions, and added ones for the new stages. These are triggered by defeating the player's opponent in a way that ensures that they fall upon a certain area of ground. If they land in the right spot, the life bars disappear and some element of the background kills them.

The Vendetta is performed by motion and button presses identical to those used in a Mortal Kombat Fatality. Each character (except the unlockable animal characters) has their own Vendetta and each is performed differently.

Cinekills are triggered when the dominant player has earned (through successful combo attacks) temporarily unlimited inner strength/energy, the victim's health is 20% or lower, and the victim is stunned. In a Cinekill, the Dark Champion appears on the field and kills the victim in a full motion video cutscene that supposedly mimics the victim's greatest fear. Certain characters have the ability to combo into this style of finishing move, such as Trident, who has an elaborate re-dizzy combo that culminates in a Cinekill. Only the base characters can receive Cinekills, though any character can trigger one. This type of finish activates automatically.

== Plot ==
Like the first game, Eternal Champions: Challenge from the Dark Side follows the story of the Eternal Champion, who felt the balance of the universe and time had been disturbed by the deaths of key individuals who had been destined to change the world for the greater good. To restore the balance, he held a great contest in which the winner would be granted the gift of new life, allowing them to fulfill their rightful destiny.

In this second chapter, it is revealed that the Eternal Champion has an evil counterpart: the Dark Champion. The Dark Champion appears and declares that he will also enter the contest and that he has hidden four more warriors, preventing the contest from truly being fulfilled. The contestants must not only achieve the aims of the Eternal Champion but also face the Dark Champion if they want their lives back.

=== Fighters ===
The game consists of a total of 24 playable characters; 13 are available from the start, including all nine playable characters from the first game. The remaining 11 characters must be unlocked through completing specific objectives or the use of cheat codes.

The game now features two final boss characters; the Eternal Champion, followed by the Dark Champion. Beating Arcade Mode with any character will reveal an epilogue explaining how the winner managed to avoid their original death, and make a major change in their era. It is followed by a series of FMVs depicting how the other starting characters encountered their original deaths. There are no such FMVs for the unlockable characters. Starting characters can also defeat other starting characters with a move called "Cinekills". This is an FMV showing the Dark Champion taking the loser to his lair and killing them based on their biggest fear.

Five of the unlockable characters are animals, and added for comedic purposes. Weaker versions of the boss characters can be unlocked for versus mode, but they cannot be used in Arcade mode without the use of cheat codes.

==== Starting characters ====
The starting roster consists of all nine fighters from the previous game, along with four new characters:

- Dawson — Sherriff Dawson McShane is a law enforcer from the American Wild West in 1849. He was lynched by a notorious gang as revenge for apprehending one of their members.
- Ramses III — Ramses III is an Egyptian pharaoh from 151 B.C. He drowned after being pushed into the River Nile by an assassin.
- Raven — Raven Gindar is an Arawak voodoo priestess from 1802. An aging witchdoctor pretended to be an injured old man to gain her trust, before using her own magical hourglass to completely drain her of her youth until she died.
- Riptide — Sophia de Medici, AKA Riptide, is a pirate from 1566. She and the entire Medici family were killed by a ruthless pirate after discovering the location of his stolen loot.

==== Unlockable characters ====
- Blast — Sgt. Thomas "Blast" Chavez is a helicopter pilot with the Green Berets in 1955. He was killed during his final mission in Vietnam when his co-pilot turned traitor and dropped a grenade in his helicopter just after take-off. Blast was intended to be in the first game, but was removed due to memory limitations.
- Chin Wo — Chin Wo is an acupuncturist and healer from Hong Kong in 1815. He had been a champion fighter for the Emperor despite hating violence. He refused to accept a challenge for a fight to death from a young rival, who then murdered a beggar and framed Chin. The rival offered to have the charges dropped if Chin accepted his challenge. For his refusal, Chin was executed on a false murder charge. Like Blast, Chin was intended to be in the first game, but was removed due to memory limitations.
- Crispy — Crispy is a chicken living in Vietnam in 1967. He tried to prevent some heavily armed raiders from claiming his fellow livestock as food, but was killed.
- Hooter — Hooter is an owl that served as the familiar to the warlock Vaspian, the human form of Thanatos. After his master was executed during the Salem witch trials, Hooter began studying each execution to form a plan to avenge his master's death. A civilian realized that Hooter was always present and threw him into a bonfire with Xavier.
- Senator — As his name implies, he is a Senator from Washington D.C., who had become rich and powerful through bribes from corrupt organizations. His 1995 re-election campaign centered around exposing corruption in politics, leading his former sponsors to conspire to ensure he lost. Having lost all of his money on an unsuccessful campaign, he suffered a heart attack and died alone. He is the only character to die by natural causes. He is a joke character designed to mock lobbyists who had rallied for censorship in video games.
- Slither — Slither is a pet rattlesnake that lives in an American Wild West bar in 1820. He was killed while helping his owner try to stop an armed robbery.
- Thanatos — Thanatos is the Greek god of death, who was cursed by an unknown force that stole his position, turning him into the human Vaspian in 1692. As he retained some of his supernatural abilities, he was executed in the Salem witch trials under a false charge of witchcraft.
- Yappy — Yappy is a pampered dog who inherited everything after its owner died in 1995. A cruel family member dumped Yappy in the streets to try and claim the inheritance. Yappy attempted to get revenge by chewing through their car's brake cables, but fell out while the car was in motion and was crushed under a wheel.
- Zuni — Zuni is a performing circus monkey in 1902. He attempted to raise the alarm when a lantern was knocked over and set fire to straw in the animal enclosure. During the panic, he was accidentally trampled to death by an elephant, and all of the circus attendees were killed in the fire.

==== Bosses ====
- The Eternal Champion — The Eternal Champion is the host of the tournament. He awakens every thousand years to hold the contest. He selects people who died before they could do great things in their era. This involves removing them from their original timeline just before their point of death. If the tournament winner can also defeat him, he will tell the winner how they originally died so they may attempt to prevent it. The Eternal Champion uses supernatural attacks based on animals.
- The Dark Champion — The second and final boss. He attempts to disrupt the tournament so that none of the participants will change history for the better. He also attempts to corrupt them by encouraging them to become more bloodthirsty, and will kill some of them through "Cinekills". His fighting style is identical to The Eternal Champion, but his powers are based on natural disasters.

== Release ==
Eternal Champions: Challenge from the Dark Side was the first game to carry Sega's internal Deep Water warning icon label, which was employed by Sega of America for games featuring adult content. In North America, the game earned an "M" (for Mature) rating for its graphic violence and gore from the freshly-introduced IDSA system (later ESRB). In Europe, it earned both an 18+ ELSPA rating and a 15 BBFC rating.

== Reception ==
GamePro gave the game a mixed review. They highly approved of the stage designs and said the rendered cinematics "offer a nice alternative to the full-motion, live-action video prevalent on Sega CDs." However, they criticized that the game has only minor enhancements over the original Genesis game, and concluded with a reference to the Sega CD's "Welcome to the next level" advertising slogan: "Instead of taking us to the next level, EC has merely taken us to a different part of the same one." Electronic Gaming Monthly gave it a 6.125 out of 10, with Ed Semrad summarizing it as "simply a hodgepodge of fatalities strewn across a poor fighting game." The other three members of the EGM review panel concurred that Sega seemed to be trying to draw attention away from the loose controls, sluggish combat, inappropriate audio, and lack of improvement from the first Eternal Champions using flashy fatality sequences. Though some of them found the fatalities entertaining, they said they were not enough to give the game any sort of lasting appeal. Next Generation reviewed the game, rating it four stars out of five, and stated that what Sega did was "take a good game, and use the inexpensive storage capacity of CD to add surprises until they build something people will be digging stuff out of for years. Very cool."

Retro gaming website Racketboy included it among the games that "defined" the Sega CD, noting that "Even though the Sega CD was a commercial failure, Challenge from the Dark Side sold better in the U.S. than the Genesis versions of Street Fighter II."
