= Les Manley in: Lost in L.A. =

1991 video game

Les Manley in: Lost in LA
- Platform(s): MS-DOS
- Release: 1991
- Mode(s): Single-player

Les Manley in: Lost in L.A. is the second game in the Les Manley series of adult-themed graphical adventure games. It is often compared to the Leisure Suit Larry game series as both are adult-themed adventure games with a male protagonist. Different from its predecessor Search for the King which used a text parser, Lost in L.A. is a point-and-click adventure game. In 2020, Ziggurat Interactive acquired the publishing rights and re-released the game as a digital download on GOG.com.

== Plot ==
The game continues where Search for the King ended. Les Manley's friend Helmut Bean and his girlfriend LaFonda Turner have disappeared. Les Manley needs to visit many locations in Hollywood to unravel the mystery and find them.

== Reception ==
Allen L. Greenberg reviewed the game for Computer Gaming World, and stated that "this beginner-level game represents a good, solid effort from Accolade. The digitized photos will not appeal to everyone and may not even be appropriate for an adventure game taking place outside of California. But, heck, actors need to eat."

Hoog Spel praised the visuals and music, but criticized the low difficulty and said "two hours to solve a game back to front is just too little" Richard Cobbett in a retrospective for PC Gamer said "The Les Manley games failed miserably to knock the Leisure Suit Larry games off their perch, lacking a memorable character, any writing chops, or any real understanding of adventure game design."
