= Last Half of Darkness =

- Genres: Adventure, horror
- First release: Last Half of Darkness; 1989
- Latest release: Last Half of Darkness (2025); 2025

Last Half of Darkness is a point and click adventure horror video game franchise that began in 1989 with the DOS "early horror adventure" video game Last Half of Darkness developed by SoftLab Laboratories.

Other games in the series include: Last Half of Darkness II (1992), Last Half of Darkness III (1993), Last Half of Darkness (2000), Last Half of Darkness: Shadows of the Servants (2005), Last Half of Darkness: Beyond the Spirit's Eye (2007), Tomb of Zojir: Last Half of Darkness (2009), Last Half of Darkness: Society of the Serpent Moon (2011), and "Last Half of Darkness (2025)". The Society of the Serpent Moon was published by Iceberg Interactive.

Gaming Lives said that the franchise "has many fans and offers traditional horror adventure gaming with some innovative 'hands-on' puzzle features".

== Production ==
The 2000 game Last Half of Darkness was a remake that combined the first three games in the franchise.

== Gameplay ==
The franchise is based around adventure game mechanics; for example the first entry had a text-based interface and allowed the player to manipulate items using four verbs: Move, Examine, Take and Operate. Later games in the series adopted the typical point and click styled interaction. It is very rare in the franchise for the player to interact with other human characters, as most of the NPCs are ghosts and apparitions.

== Plot ==
Consisting of an investigative and horror-themed series of plots, the games are based inside locations such as a haunted mansion where cases must be solved.

== Critical reception ==
- Last Half of Darkness received a 3/5 from Abandonia. MyAbandonWare deemed it "one of the most obscure horror games ever made". According to DocCollection, the game acquired a cult following.
- Last Half of Darkness II received a 2/5 from Abandonia.
- Last Half of Darkness: Shadows of the Servants received a B+ from GameBomers, and 4/5 stars from Metzomagic.
- Last Half of Darkness: Beyond the Spirit's Eye received 90/100 from AdventureLantern and 4/5 stars from Metzomagic.
- Last Half of Darkness: Tomb of Zojir received a 6/10 from Gamer.nl. DiehardGamerfan wrote that "the atmosphere is spectacular, the music is chilling, the game is creepy as hell and it features some really innovative puzzles". AdventureLanterm gave it 4.5/5 stars while AdventureGamers gave it 3.5/5 stars.
- Last Half of Darkness: Society of the Serpent Moon received 3.5 stars from AdventureGamers, and a B from GameBoomers. Adventure Classic Gaming called it "absorbing, thrilling, and enjoyable". Diehard Gamefan deemed it "solid, [and] mostly stable". It received 5.5/10 from CapsuleComputers.
