= Stealth ATF =

1989 video game

- North American cover art
- Developer: Imagineering, Inc.
- Publishers: NA: Activision; PAL: Nintendo
- Director: Garry Kitchen
- Producer: Tom Sloper
- Designer: Rob Harris
- Programmer: Rob Harris
- Artist: Jesse Kapili
- Composer: Russell Lieblich
- Platform: NES
- Release: NA: October 1989; PAL: 1990
- Genre: First-person and third-person flight simulator
- Modes: Single-player, multiplayer

Stealth ATF is a stealth fighter video game released by Activision in 1989 for the Nintendo Entertainment System. The object of the game is to take out aircraft that are trying to destroy the player's stealth fighter. The game supports up to two players.

== Gameplay ==
Stealth fighter on runway

The player is in full control of their Lockheed F-117 Nighthawk stealth attack aircraft; controlling every aspect of the military flight experience from exiting the runway and battling other fighters while airborne to landing the plane after the battle is over. The fighter is equipped with machine guns and missiles to take out enemy aircraft. Each level has different scenery and varying types of runways; for example, some levels will have a very long runway on solid ground, while others may have a very short one on a carrier out in the ocean. The player must also be aware of the damage the fighter has taken, the number of missiles it has remaining, and the altitude of the fighter (so it will not crash into the ground).

Missions take place in the potential military hot spots of the late 1980s. These locations are: such as the Middle East, Alaska, and the Pacific.

=== Controls ===
- Control Pad – steer plane
- A button – fire machine guns
- B button – fire missile
- Start – Stealth Mode
- Select – turn sound on/off

== Reception ==
Allgame gave the video game a score of 2.5 stars out of a possible 5 in their overview. The Video Game Critic gave Stealth ATF a letter grade of F (less than 5 out of 10) in their April 8, 2001 overview.
