= Les Manley in: Search for the King =

1990 video game

- Developer: Accolade
- Publishers: Ziggurat Interactive; Accolade
- Designer: Steve Cartwright
- Series: Les Manley
- Platforms: Amiga; MS-DOS
- Release: 1990
- Genre: Adventure game
- Mode: Single-player

Les Manley in: Search for the King is the first game in the Les Manley series of adult-themed graphical adventure games. It is often compared to the Leisure Suit Larry game series as both are adult-themed adventure games with a male protagonist. It was followed by Lost in L.A. in 1991. In 2020, Ziggurat Interactive acquired the publishing rights and re-released the game as a digital download on GOG.com.

== Plot ==
Les Manley is an employee at a TV station. The station wants to improve their ratings and to achieve this, they offer a million dollars to the person who manages to find "the King", that is, Elvis. Les Manley sees this as an opportunity and embarks on a quest to find Elvis, after bragging to female secretary Stella Hart that he'd succeed.

Les Manley impersonates a reporter to visit a woman possessing a scarf said to belong to Elvis, and steals it from her. At a local circus, he befriends Helmut Bean, the world's smallest man, by giving him a dream that he grabbed from a sleeping guard. Les Manley makes a fortune teller - who says she's a mere dream - vanish by touching her, and finds a resurrection card among her belongings. An acrobat is helped by Manley to perform, but plummets to the ground when attempting to jump into a water container from a high altitude, after which Manley takes his cape.

Les Manley is catapulted all the way to Las Vegas by a strongman game, and reacquires the unharmed Helmut whom he mailed there beforehand. In a hotel suite, Helmut is small enough to enter a bathtub's drain and find therein a receipt from nearly 20 years ago. The receipt earns Les Manley an Elvis-styled suit at the hotel's laundry service. When he talks to a sunbathing woman, she is quickly drawn to him and goes swimming to relax, leaving him sunglasses like the ones Elvis used to wear. Les Manley then hitchhikes to Elvis's mansion.

Les Manley partakes in a celebrity lookalike contest and dresses up like Elvis with the scarf, sunglasses, suit, and cape. He secures last place even though he's the only contestant so far, but as a consolation prize, he is allowed unsupervised access to Elvis's mansion. Les Manley finds therein items to improve his outfit, and his second attempt in the contest is so successful that the crowd mistakes him for the real Elvis and, in wild ecstasy, tramples him to death. Les Manley meets Elvis in the afterlife, gets a photograph of him, and the resurrection card allows Les Manley to return to life with the photo. The TV station is unable to pay him the required reward, so he gains ownership of the station instead, and Stella becomes his personal assistant.

== Development ==
Steve Cartwright was inspired by Sierra's achievements in adventure game engine programming to create similar, possibly superior tools. Unlike at Activision, where he had made action games, once Cartwright transferred Accolade he was allowed to develop the engine he wanted. Also working on Les Manley was Michael Berlyn, who previously worked for Infocom, and who aspired to create "the ultimate parser".

The game's engine makes more use of raster graphics than the "line and fill" technique compared to common adventure games of the time. A sequence of a female Accolade employee approaching a water cooler was filmed and digitized for the game's animation.

== Reception ==
Richard Cobbett in a retrospective for PC Gamer criticized the parser-based control system that requires typing exactly what you want Les to do and the overall puzzle difficulty. Computer Gaming World stated "Accolade's shameless attempt at copying Sierra's popular Leisure Suit Larry series actually turned out pretty good". Amiga Power gave the Amiga version 71% and praised the graphics, but found the controls frustrating and humor inaccessible to a UK audience, and compared the game unfavorably to The Secret of Monkey Island.

== See also ==
- Sightings of Elvis Presley
