= Bush vs. Kerry Boxing =

2004 video game

- Developer: Sorrent
- Publisher: Sorrent
- Platform: Mobile
- Release: NA: August 22, 2004
- Genre: Boxing
- Mode: Single player

Bush vs. Kerry Boxing is a boxing video game developed and published by Sorrent for mobile phones. It was released in North America on August 22, 2004.

The game allows the player to choose to play as either George W. Bush or John Kerry to fight out the 2004 United States presidential election; the candidate chosen must fight through a number of preliminary rounds against the opponent's supporters in order to eventually fight the opposing candidate. Bush vs. Kerry Boxing garnered mostly positive reviews from critics. As of 2009, Bush vs. Kerry Boxing has received a 75.5% from GameRankings.

== Gameplay ==
The player fights Dick Cheney.

Bush vs. Kerry Boxing is for the most part a re-purposing of another Sorrent boxing title, Fox Sports Boxing, with election characters instead of more standard pugilists. The game is a first person boxing game; the game is seen from behind the player's gloves. The game's view is filled by the opponent, as they dodge, punch, and counter against the player. Both the player and the opponent have a stamina meter, which as they perform actions is slowly drained. The character is KO'd after the stamina meter runs out unless the player can press the 0 button on the phone enough times to make a recovery.

Bush vs. Kerry Boxing features many prominent politicians from around the time of the 2004 Presidential election. The game gives the player the choice between playing as George W. Bush or John Kerry, the two main candidates from the 2004 United States presidential election. The opponents the player faces change depending on which candidate he chooses to fight with; if the player chooses Bush, the player faces Democratic opponents such as John Edwards and Ted Kennedy, while if the player chooses Kerry, the player faces Republican opponents such as Donald Rumsfeld and Dick Cheney. Hillary Clinton is the game's referee, and Ralph Nader is the ring girl.

The game contains a "national polling system," which tracks online how many times each candidate is beaten by players. The game keeps track of both local and national results.

== Development ==
Sorrent, the game's developers, already had several other boxing games properties that they had made for mobile phones. They were inspired to retool them into Bush vs. Kerry Boxing after reading in TIME how journalists were referring to the presidential candidates as contenders and using boxing metaphors.

== Reception ==
Bush vs. Kerry Boxing garnered positive reaction from critics who praised the game's humor and light-hearted approach to the election; it received a 75.5% from GameRankings. GameSpot's Steve Palley felt that the game struck up a good balance between humor and gameplay. IGN's Levi Buchanan thought that the game was a "great goof".
