= Hoog Spel =

Dutch video game magazine

- Hoog Spel logo
- Publisher: Rangeela B.V.
- Founded: 1990
- Final issue: 2000
- Country: Netherlands
- Based in: Amsterdam
- Website: hoogspel.nl
- OCLC: 73090800

Hoog Spel (High Game) was the first video games magazine in the Netherlands. The magazine was published by Rangeela B.V. between 1990 and 2000. The publisher of the magazine was Harry d’Emme.
