= Hacker II: The Doomsday Papers =

1986 video game

- Developer: Activision
- Publisher: Activision
- Designer: Steve Cartwright
- Platforms: Amiga, Amstrad CPC, Apple II, Apple IIGS, Atari ST, Commodore 64, IBM PC, Mac, ZX Spectrum
- Release: 1986
- Genres: Adventure, strategy
- Mode: Single-player

Hacker II: The Doomsday Papers is a video game written by Steve Cartwright and published by Activision in 1986. It is the sequel to the 1985 game Hacker. Hacker II was released for the Amiga, Apple II, Apple IIGS, Amstrad CPC, Atari ST, Commodore 64, IBM PC compatibles, Mac, and ZX Spectrum.

== Plot ==
Hacker II is more difficult and involved than the first game. In Hacker II, the player is actually recruited based upon their (assumed) success with the activities in the original game. Once again, they are tasked with controlling a robot, this time to infiltrate a secure facility in order to retrieve documents known only as "The Doomsday Papers" from a well-guarded vault to ensure the security of the United States.

Eventually, as they escape with the papers, the player is confronted by agents of the United States who reveal that they have actually been working for a former Magma employee, who wanted the papers in revenge for what had happened to the company the player had presumably exposed in the first game. The building that the player had unwittingly broken into was a government facility. The player then has to go back into the facility as part of a gambit to expose the Magma agent, avoiding the same security that had threatened the player before.

== Gameplay ==
Gameplay screenshot (Atari ST)

Gameplay is considerably changed from the previous game, and the packaging notably includes a "manual" describing the function of a four-way monitor system provided to the player. It is hooked into the camera security network of the facility the player is asked to infiltrate. A handful of robots called Mobile Remote Units (MRUs) are available, hidden in the facility, in case some are destroyed by the Annihilator. By using the camera system and in-game map that helps track guard patrols, which cameras are being monitored and the location of the MRU, the player must explore the one-floor facility and find the codes needed to open the vault and escape with the papers. Also the player has to ensure that the vault alarms are disabled in the correct order. To aid the player there is also a pre-recorded security tape of a typical day for every camera in the facility, which the player can bypass the actual camera feed with when they need to be in an area for an extended time although care is needed to ensure the time stamp matches with the actual time of the game.

Discovery by the guards must be avoided at all costs because once alerted, they will call in a huge machine called the "Annihilator" that resembles a large frame on wheels with a crusher mounted. This machine pursues the player's defenseless MRU and attempt to crush it with the plate. The player can try to avoid the Annihilator, although it is relentless in its pursuit and is much faster than the player's MRU. If all the player's MRUs are destroyed, the game is over. Things that can set off the alarms include being seen by the patrolling guard who has constant line of sight in the corridors, having one of the cameras see the MRU, incorrectly disabling the vault security or failing to properly sync a bypassed camera feed with actual time giving evidence there is tampering going on.

The game also featured escalating problems as the player's in-game map begins to fail; by losing progress of the player's MRU, monitored security cameras, the guard and eventually the whole map blacks out; so in order to get into the vault the player may well be forced to control the MRU blindly relying on maps that should have been made by the player.

There are no saves available in the game, as in the first title.

== Reception ==
Compute! described Hacker II as not having an original plot and criticized the inability to save, but favorably reported on the game's graphics, detail, and user interface. The magazine stated that it had "some of the most exciting and harrowing scenarios you'll find in a computer game" and advised, "I do not recommend it to anyone with a weak heart". Antic praised the Atari ST version's graphics and gameplay, but warned "It may take hundreds of hours to master it". Computer Gaming World praised Hacker II's graphics and design on the ST, and stated that the game more accurately depicted system cracking than Hacker, but cautioned that its difficulty and scale would not appeal to everyone. Info gave the Commodore 64 version four stars out of five, describing it as "a superior sequel to the original ... An engrossing and challenging espionage game".
