= Barnstorming (video game) =

1982 video game

- Developer: Activision
- Publisher: Activision
- Designer: Steve Cartwright
- Platform: Atari 2600
- Release: NA: March 1982
- Genre: Racing
- Mode: Single-player

Barnstorming is a biplane racing video game for the Atari 2600 designed by Steve Cartwright and published by Activision in 1982. It was the first game designed by Cartwright. The idea for Barnstorming came to him as he watched a biplane while driving home from work. The goal is to get the fastest time on each course while also flying through all of the barns.

== Gameplay ==
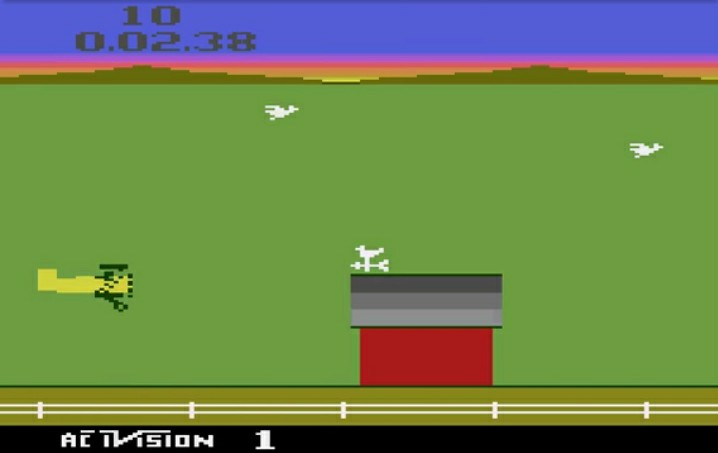
Gameplay screenshot

The player must pilot a biplane through a series of barns in the shortest time possible while dodging windmills, weather vanes, and geese. Bumping into anything slows down the plane for a couple of seconds, increasing the overall time.

There are four levels of play determined by the game select switch. Game 1 is Hedge Hopper (10 barns), game 2 is Crop Duster (15 barns), game 3 is Stunt Pilot (15 barns), and game 4 is Flying Ace (25 barns). In the first three games, the course layout of barns, windmills, and even geese do not change, making it easy to memorize the layout. Game 4 is the only game with a random course.

Originally, a player with a time or better of 33.3 seconds on game 1, 51.0 seconds on game 2, or 54.0 seconds on game 3 could send Activision a picture of their screen and receive membership in the Activision Flying Aces and a Flying Aces patch.

== Reception ==
Barnstorming was released in March 1982. Richard A. Edwards reviewed Barnstorming in The Space Gamer, commenting that "This is a game no Atari VCS owner should be without. Buy it."

From retrospective reviews, Scott Alan Marriott of AllGame noted the game's impressive visuals but that the game got dull on repeated playthroughs as the game noting that "all of the levels are structured the same way [...] Once you complete your objective, you can either have another go at it or see how fast the cartridge flies under chairs."

== See also ==
- List of Atari 2600 games
- List of Activision games: 1980–1999
