= Russell Lieblich =

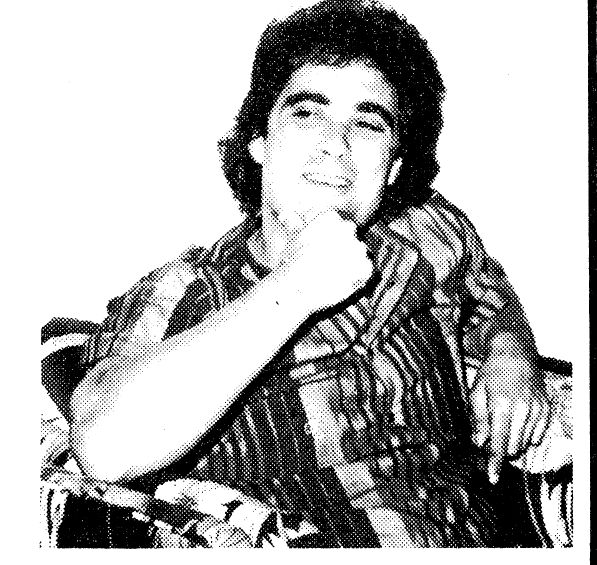
- Lieblich, circa 1985
- Born: Russell Lieblich; March 2, 1953; New York
- Died: January 26, 2005 (aged 51); Coram, New York
- Occupation(s): Game designer, programmer, musician

Russell Lieblich (March 2, 1953 – January 26, 2005) was a game designer, programmer and musician who first came to prominence for his music for Activision and Intellivision games, as well as doing the Commodore 64 (C64) music translation of one of LucasArts first titles, Ballblazer. He graduated with a Master's Degree in Music from UC San Diego.

His work spans more than 30 game titles; including Stealth ATF for the Nintendo Entertainment System.

A well known musician/composer from the demoscene, Romeo Knight, remixed Lieblich's C64 version of the Ballblazer music with a Beastie Boys vocal track, producing one of the most popular tracks featured on Remix64.

He died on January 26, 2005, after a heart attack outside his home on Long Island, New York, at the age of 51.
