= Larn (video game) =

1986 video game

- Developer: Noah Morgan
- Designer: Noah Morgan
- Platform: Cross-platform
- Release: 1986
- Genre: Roguelike
- Mode: Single-player

Larn is a roguelike video game written by Noah Morgan in 1986 for the UNIX operating system. Morgan's original version of Larn remains part of the NetBSD games collection.

It can take many hours and tens (or even hundreds) of thousands of game turns to beat other roguelikes, such as NetHack or Ancient Domains of Mystery, but Larn can reasonably be completed in one play session.

== History ==
Primary development of Larn halted in 1991 with version 12.3, but its open source nature has led to later variants and rewrites, including some that are still being developed and maintained as of 2026. Developers have ported the game to such diverse operating systems as Solaris, Amiga OS, Atari TOS, and Microsoft Windows.

== Modern Continuation ==
As of 2026, the original Larn codebase continues to receive updates and has received new features that other traditional roguelikes have not implemented. The author of this version has continued Larn since 2014 in a way as if original development never halted.

These new features (as of version 26.40) include:

- Dynamic water expansion and erosion
- Dynamic lava cooling
- Real-time state engine allowing animations while still being turn-based
- Full colour support

The author has ported the code to other operating systems and architectures such as DEC VAX, SunOS UltraSPARC, Haiku, DOS and even OS/2, as well as Linux, macOS and Windows.

At 40 years old, this makes Larn one of the oldest video games still being developed from its original codebase.

== Variants ==
=== ULarn ===
In 1987, Phil Cordier modified the Larn source code to form Ultra-Larn, or more commonly, ULarn. It introduced true character classes and additional levels, weapons, etc. As with its parent, other developers have maintained and refined ULarn in the absence of its author. ULarn was released under the GNU General Public License. Because Morgan's original 1986 license prohibits commercial redistribution, it is not license-compatible with the GPL.

== Gameplay ==
Larn is one of the first roguelike games to feature a persistent home level - in this case, a town. In addition to the player's residence, the town offers a bank, a shop, a trading post, a school, a tax administration office, and entrances to two dungeons, one of which is a volcano.

The goal of Larn is for the player to traverse a dungeon in search of a potion that will cure his ailing daughter of 'dianthroritis'. This quest is time-limited, measured in 'mobuls'. Apart from the main dungeon's ten levels, three additional levels are located beneath a volcanic shaft. To obtain the sought-after potion, the player must first acquire adequate experience, power, and gold. Larn increases in difficulty each time it is finished, making it harder for players to perform in-game actions, such as destroying walls or statues. Larn also requires the player pay a tax in subsequent games based on the amount of money in the player's possession when the game was last won.
