= Lexi-Cross =

1991 video game

- Publisher(s): Interplay Productions
- Designer(s): Peter Oliphant
- Platform(s): MS-DOS, Macintosh
- Release: 1991: MS-DOS; 1992: Mac
- Genre(s): Word

Lexi-Cross is a video game written by Peter Oliphant for MS-DOS and published by Interplay Productions in 1991. A Macintosh version was released in 1992. Lexi-Cross presents a futuristic TV game show, with elements similar to Wheel of Fortune, Scrabble, and Battleship. Players can choose to play as human or alien, and computer opponents are robots.

The game came with a small booklet parodying the format and style of TV Guide that served as a game manual and copy protection device.

== Gameplay ==
Each player has a grid of hidden tiles concealing various hidden words. Players take turns revealing tiles in an attempt to find either letter tiles or bonuses, similarly to Battleship. Players may alternatively spin a wheel to guess a letter as in Wheel of Fortune. The words eventually comprise a theme or quotation, which the player must guess to win the game.

== Reception ==
Computer Gaming World stated that "Lexi-Cross is a refreshing variation on the ever popular game show theme ... habit-forming as a couch potato's viewing preferences and challenging as a classic strategy game".

In 1996, Computer Gaming World declared Lexi-Cross the 132nd-best computer game ever released.
