= Seaquest (video game) =

1983 video game

- Developer: Steve Cartwright
- Publisher: Activision
- Platform: Atari 2600
- Release: February 1983
- Genre: Shoot 'em up
- Modes: Single-player, multiplayer

Seaquest is an Atari 2600 video game designed by Steve Cartwright and published by Activision in 1983. The game is an underwater shooter in which the player controls a submarine on a mission to rescue divers.

== Gameplay ==
Gameplay screenshot

The player uses a submarine to shoot at enemies and rescue divers. Hazards include sharks which attack divers and the player and enemy submarines, which can shoot torpedoes at the player's submarine. The player must ward off the enemies by firing an unlimited supply of torpedoes while trying to rescue divers swimming through the water. The points awarded to the player for shooting an enemy starts at 10 points each and increases as the game advances. The sub can hold up to six divers at a time. Each time the player resurfaces prior to having a full load of six divers, one of the divers is removed.

The submarine has a limited amount of oxygen. The player must surface often in order to replenish the oxygen, but if the player resurfaces without any rescued divers, they will lose a life. If the player resurfaces with the maximum amount of divers, they will gain bonus points for the sub's remaining oxygen. Each time the player surfaces, the game's difficulty increases; enemies increase in number and speed. Eventually an enemy sub begins patrolling the surface, leaving the player without a safe haven.

The player starts the game with 3 extra lives and is awarded an additional extra life each time the player scores 10,000 points.

Seaquest can be played single-player or with two players alternating turns.

Like other Activision 2600 games, this one had a patch you can send in to get. It required you to get a score of 50,000. You would send in a photo of your game showing this, and they'd send you an "achievement patch".

== Development ==
Steve Cartwright designed Seaquest, and described the game as a reskin of the arcade game Defender (1981). He felt that the Atari 2600 adapted arcade games well, describing that most games of that era were "fast-paced arcade games because of this."

Cartwright stated that there was a salvage company called "Seaquest Inc or something" that sued Activision for stealing their name for the game. He met the groups lawyers in Chicago and when explaining the title was original and not based on searching sunken ships or for treasure, the case was dismissed.

== Release and reception ==
Reception

Review scores
Publication	Score
Electronic Fun with Computers & Games	3/4
Micro & Video	4/5
TeleMatch	3/6
Video Games Player	B

Seaquest was released in February 1983 for the Atari 2600.

Contemporary reviews in Video and Computer Gaming Illustrated, Micro & Video, Electronic Fun with Computers & Games and Video Games Player all complimented the games graphics with the latter two stating they were up to the usual high quality standard expected from Activision. Reviews in Games and Micro & Video also complimented the sound with the first publication saying it was "a welcome change from the usual munch and crunch." while the latter said the sound was key to the game, such as the sound made when running low on oxygen. Jim Clark of Video and Computer Gaming Illustrated said the game "splendidly creates an underwater environment" and that the ability to not be continuously ready for play was a "delightful change-of-pace." E.C. Meade of the same publication found the game "pretty slow going" and "not terribly difficult" concluding that Seaquest "never really gets cooking as fast as Activision's other games." TeleMatch found the graphics to be "a little too abstract".

Reviewers commented on the controls with The Video Game Update stating that Cartwright had "managed to impart a genuine sense of being underwater in this game: there's a buoyant feeling to the way your sub handles, air bubbles move upward from the divers as they kick their flippered feet." while Micro & Video found the controls very responsive and appreciated the ability to continuously shoot missiles by holding your hand down the fire button. "too complex for kids and too slow for real enthusiasts." "good but nothing more."

Meade said that the game would be "too complex for kids and too slow for real enthusiasts." concluding it to be ultimately "good but nothing more." A separate review in Video and Computer Gaming Illustrated found it "not varied enough to hold a player's attention over a period of months. A fine game nonetheless." The reviewer in Electronic Fun with Computers & Games concluded that " "once you get the hang of it, Seaquest is a little like shooting fish in a barrel."

From retrospective reviews, Darran Jones wrote in Retro Gamer was one of the few games that lived up to its "fantastic box art" highlighting that Cartwright had "mixed things up by giving you divers to rescue and a strict air supply to manage."

== See also ==
- List of Atari 2600 games
- List of Activision games: 1980–1999
