= Glen Schofield =

American video game designer

Glen A. Schofield
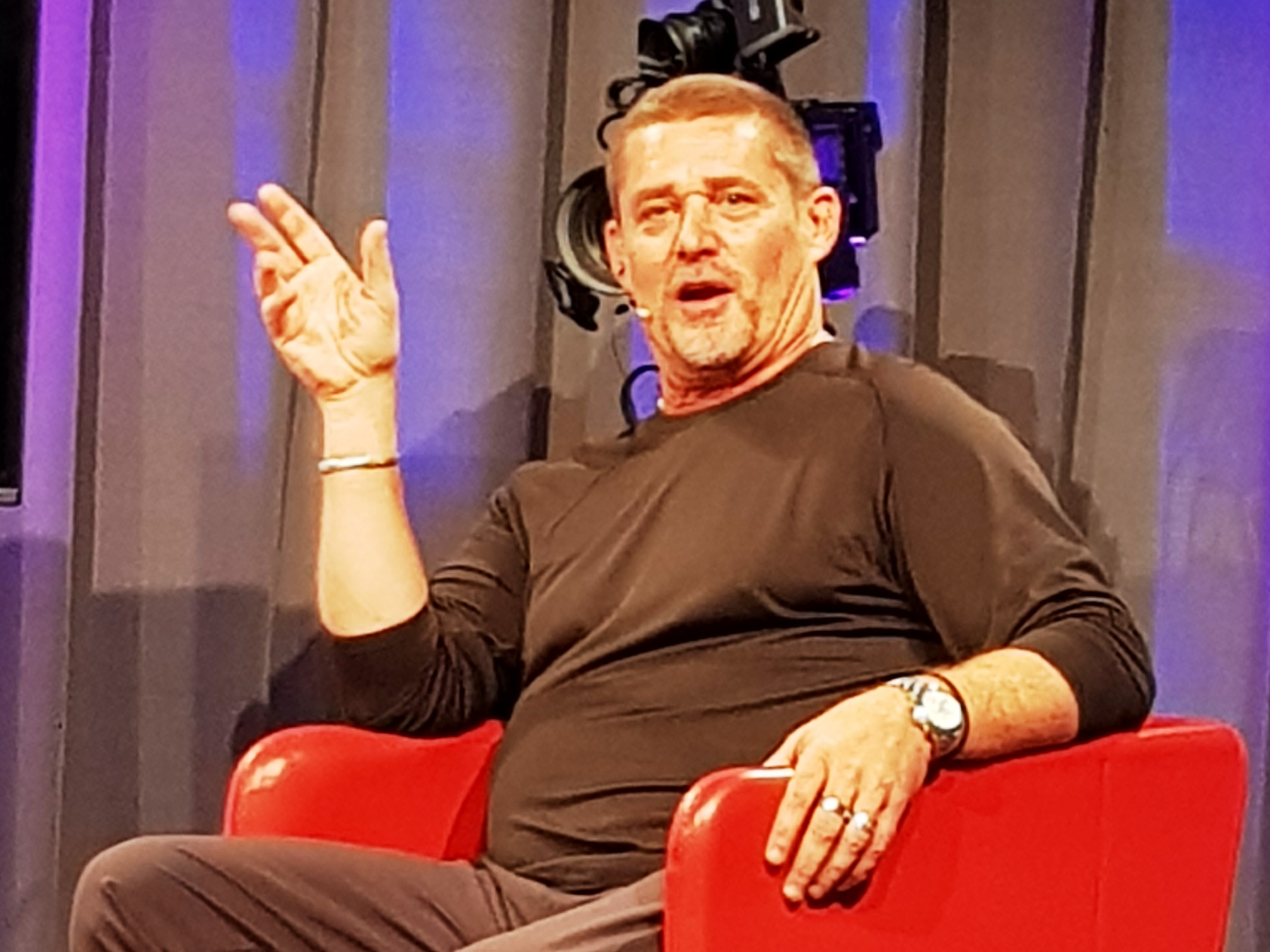
- Schofield at the Paris Cité des Sciences et de l'Industrie on September 22, 2017
- Occupations: Video game designer; producer; programmer
- Known for: Visceral Games, Sledgehammer Games, Striking Distance Studios
- Notable work: Dead Space; Call of Duty: Advanced Warfare; The Callisto Protocol
- Children: 3

Glen A. Schofield is a former American video game artist, designer, director, and producer. He was primarily known for his roles as the vice president and general manager at Visceral Games, co-founder of Sledgehammer Games, founder and former CEO of Striking Distance Studios, and the creator and executive producer of the third-person survival horror video game series Dead Space.

== Career ==
Schofield trained in both fine arts and business, earning a BFA from Pratt Institute and an MBA from Golden Gate University. His career began as an artist and art director at Imagineering, the development division of Absolute Entertainment at New Jersey. He then relocated to Seattle to join the West Coast's burgeoning video games industry. His professional influences included Asteroids, Moon Patrol, Gunstar Heroes, Disruptor and the Contra series, followed later by Resident Evil, Gears of War, and the franchise he would eventually contribute to, Modern Warfare.

As a vice president at Crystal Dynamics, Schofield headed development on two of the studio's franchises: Gex and Legacy of Kain. Moving to EA Redwood Studios (later Visceral Games) as general manager, he collaborated with Bret Robbins, including the popular Lord of the Rings video series and 007: From Russia with Love.

Schofield's reputation grew with the 2008 title Dead Space, which Edge magazine called "a work of passionate sci-fi horror that became one of most commercially successful new properties of the year." Schofield has said that the film Event Horizon inspired him to create a game that fused the genres of science fiction and horror. The game's theme of humans in space losing perspective to their place in the universe is influenced by the works of Isaac Asimov and Arthur C. Clarke, after whom the game character Isaac Clarke was named.

Schofield, executive producer on the project, worked with Michael Condrey, senior development director. The game launched a franchise of sequels, comics, novels and films, and went on to win more than 80 industry awards, including the Academy of Interactive Arts & Sciences' Action Game of the Year and two awards from the British Academy of Film and Television Arts. During his time at EA Redwood Studios, the studio was ranked 17th in the top 50 Game Developers List of 2009 by Game Developer Research. Edge named him one of the Hot 100 Game Developers of 2009.

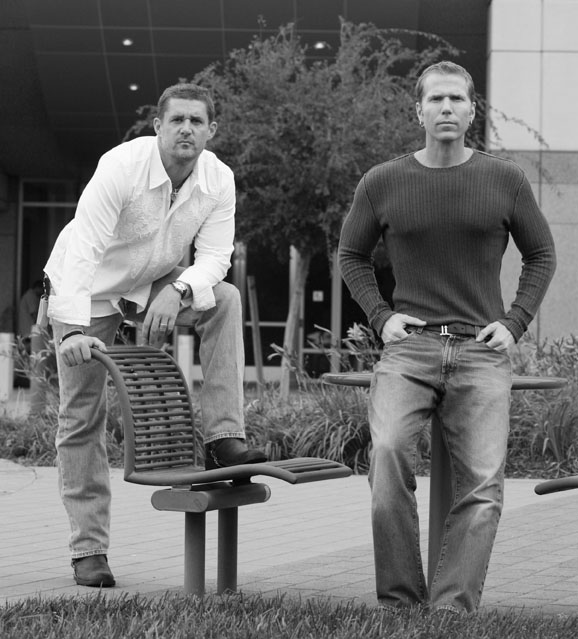
Schofield (left) and Michael Condrey at the Sledgehammer headquarters, 2009

In 2009, Schofield and Condrey created Sledgehammer Games, with Schofield as general manager and Condrey as chief operating officer. They retained those roles when, that November, Activision acquired the company as a wholly owned development studio operating on an independent model. In December 2018, he announced his departure from Sledgehammer Games to seek new opportunities.

Schofield was also a storyboard director and created over 100 characters for the animated series The Adventures of the Galaxy Rangers.

In June 2019, Schofield announced that he was joining Krafton as the CEO of a new development team called Striking Distance Studios. Under Schofield, the studio will be developing a game with a narrative experience set in the PlayerUnknown's Battlegrounds's universe. The game would later drop this connection in May 2022, no longer being attached to the PlayerUnknown's Battlegrounds universe. The Callisto Protocol was revealed at The Game Awards 2020 and planned for release in 2022.

The Callisto Protocol failed to reach its anticipated sales goals, resulting in Schofield voluntarily leaving Striking Distance Studios in September 2023.

Since then, Schofield (along with Christopher Stone and Bret Robbins, the creative producers behind original Dead Space) has reportedly tried to pitch Dead Space 4 to EA on at least two separate occasions in 2024-2025. The proposal was turned down by the publisher both times. In July 2026, Glen Schofield announced his retirement from daily work within the gaming industry, thus ending his 35-year long career.

== Personal life ==
Schofield is married and has three children. In his spare time, he enjoys painting and exercising; he has said that he enjoys both cardio and weight training so much that he will exercise once a day when working on a project with a deadline and twice a day when not.

== Games ==
Title	Publisher	Released	Role
Barbie: Game Girl	Hi Tech Expressions	1991	art director/lead artist
Swamp Thing	THQ	1991	art director/lead artist
The Adventures of Rocky and Bullwinkle and Friends	THQ	1992	art director
Home Alone 2: Lost in New York	THQ	1992	artist
The Ren & Stimpy Show: Space Cadet Adventures	THQ	1992	artist
The Simpsons: Bartman Meets Radioactive Man	Acclaim Entertainment	1992	art director/lead artist
Super Battletank	Absolute Entertainment	1992	artist
Penn & Teller's Smoke and Mirrors	Absolute Entertainment	Cancelled	art director/lead artist
The Ren & Stimpy Show: Buckaroo$!	THQ	1993	art director/lead artist
Goofy's Hysterical History Tour	Absolute Entertainment	1993	art director/lead artist
The Adventures of Rocky and Bullwinkle and Friends	Absolute Entertainment	1993	art director/lead artist
Home Improvement: Power Tool Pursuit!	Absolute Entertainment	1994	art director/lead artist
Street Fighter: The Movie	Capcom	1995	artist
Major Damage		Cancelled	creator/producer
Werewolf		Cancelled	art director/producer
Gex 3D: Enter the Gecko	Eidos Interactive	1997	game director
Gex 3: Deep Cover Gecko	Crave Entertainment	1999	game director
Akuji: The Heartless	Eidos Interactive	1999	game director
Walt Disney World Quest Magical Racing Tour	Eidos Interactive	2000	game director
Mad Dash Racing	Eidos Interactive	2001	creator/game director
Knockout Kings 2003	Electronic Arts	2002	executive producer
Blood Omen 2: Legacy of Kain	Eidos Interactive	2002	game director
The Lord of the Rings: The Return of the King	Electronic Arts	2003	producer
From Russia with Love	Electronic Arts	2005	executive producer
Dead Space	Electronic Arts	2008	executive producer
The Godfather II	Electronic Arts	2009	general manager
Call of Duty: Modern Warfare 3	Activision	2011	co-director/producer
Call of Duty: Advanced Warfare	Activision	2014	co-director/producer
Call of Duty: WWII	Activision	2017	co-director/producer
The Callisto Protocol	Krafton	2022	director
