= Battletank =

1990 video game for NES

Garry Kitchen's Battletank
- Developer(s): Imagineering
- Publisher(s): Absolute Entertainment
- Designer(s): Garry Kitchen; Alex Demeo; Rob Harris; Dan Kitchen
- Composer(s): Mark Van Hecke
- Platform(s): NES
- Release: NA: September 1990
- Genre(s): Tank simulation
- Mode(s): Single-player

Garry Kitchen's Battletank is an action video game released by Absolute Entertainment in September 1990 for the Nintendo Entertainment System. The game is similar to the Atari game Battlezone, and supports one player. Code from its development was meant for a space flight game for the Commodore 64.

== Gameplay ==
Gameplay screenshot

The player is placed inside a tank, hence the game has a first person view. The tank is equipped with a smokescreen, a missile launcher, a 150mm cannon, and a .50 caliber machine gun. The object of the game is to destroy enemy tanks and helicopters in the area. If the player fires the tank's guns for too long, they will overheat and will take time to cool down.

== Reception ==
VideoGames & Computer Entertainment's David Plotkin gave Battletank an overall score of 8 out of 10, commending its controls, graphics, and gameplay.

== See also ==
- Super Battletank
- Super Battletank 2
