= Rapid Deployment Force: Global Conflict =

1995 video game

- Developer: Imagineering
- Publisher: Absolute Entertainment
- Designer: Mark Beardsley
- Platform: Sega CD
- Release: NA: March 1995
- Genres: First-person shooter, tank simulator
- Mode: Single-player

Rapid Deployment Force: Global Conflict (also known as RDF: Global Conflict) is a tank simulation video game developed Imagineering and published by Absolute Entertainment for the Sega CD.

== Gameplay ==
Rapid Deployment Force: Global Conflict is an M-1 tank simulator game.

== Development ==
Rapid Deployment Force: Global Conflict was developed by Imagineering, a subsidiary of Absolute Entertainment. It was initially reported that the game was a part of the company's Super Battletank series. In December 1994, Absolute invited members of the press to their development studio in Upper Saddle River, New Jersey to showcase RDF as well as some other projects. Journalists were transported to the Iron Hammer Training Facility, decorated to resemble a military compound, while being addressed by the actor portraying General Rock Maddick from the game.

== Reception ==
Reception

Review scores
| Publication | Score |
|---|---|
| Electronic Gaming Monthly | 19/40 |
| Game Players | 71% |
| GamePro | 3.75/5 |
| Next Generation | 2/5 |
| Ação Games | 3.83/5 |
| Electronic Entertainment | 2/5 |
| Flux | B |
| VideoGames | 6/10 |

Next Generation reviewed the game, rating it two stars out of five, and stated that "The graphics are fair, and it moves smoothly, but there's not much here to pop it above average, all the way down to the vague 'terrorists taking over the world' story line." Dan Amrich of Flux magazine described the game as a "Stripped down AH-3 Thunderstrike with a ground view and without a rockin' soundtrack." He praised the game's controls, the HUD and sound effects although criticizing the "poorly acted" and heavily pixelated FMV cutscenes. A scoreless review from GameFan contributor Kenneth Lee was more positive. He described the game as one of the best in its genre and summarized, "If you're a fan of tank sims or just looking for a good game that combines strategy with shooting skill, give RDF a try."
