= Penn & Teller's Smoke and Mirrors =

Canceled video game

- Developer: Absolute Entertainment
- Publisher: Absolute Entertainment
- Designers: Penn Jillette; Teller; Barry Marx
- Programmer: Mark Morris
- Artist: Glen Schofield
- Composer: Gary Stockdale
- Platforms: 3DO; Sega CD; Windows
- Release: Canceled
- Genre: Minigame compilation
- Modes: Single-player, multiplayer

Penn & Teller's Smoke and Mirrors is a canceled minigame compilation developed by Absolute Entertainment and starring the magician duo Penn & Teller. It comprises six minigames used to play practical jokes on others: two party tricks, two multiplayer "scams" in which one player can unfairly influence or interrupt the gameplay, the beat 'em up Smoke and Mirrors, and Desert Bus, in which the player must drive a bus over an empty, straight road for eight hours to score one point. Penn & Teller designed the game alongside Barry Marx, while Eddie Gorodetsky provided the concept for Desert Bus. The compilation was announced in 1994 for a release at the end of the year, which was later rescheduled for April Fools' Day 1995. Although the Sega CD version was finished on time and review copies were soon sent out, the financially stricken Absolute Entertainment could not afford to ship the game.

Contemporary reviews were mixed and highlighted Desert Bus as the best feature in the compilation. Absolute Entertainment ceased operations in late 1995, thus Penn & Teller's Smoke and Mirrors, including planned PC and 3DO versions, was canceled. Review copies were rediscovered several years later, and the archivist Frank Cifaldi shared one online in September 2005. Desert Bus then became the subject of Desert Bus for Hope, a charity livestream held in 2007 and subsequently turned into an annual event, which raised the game's popularity. Desert Bus was unofficially remade several times, including through paid Android and iOS versions that benefited charity in 2011 and a free virtual reality version from Gearbox Software in 2019.

== Gameplay ==
Penn & Teller's Smoke and Mirrors is a compilation of six unrelated minigames. Each game is prefaced with a full-motion video introduction starring the magicians Penn Jillette and Teller, who form the duo Penn & Teller. The game distinguishes between the owner of the game, who is aware of its functionality, and an unsuspecting person (the "sucker"). Using the hidden "owner menu", the owner can set up certain minigames to play practical jokes on the sucker.

=== Tricks: What's Your Sign? and Mofo the Psychic Gorilla ===
For What's Your Sign?, the owner inputs the sucker's birthday into the owner menu beforehand. When the sucker is playing, Penn & Teller ask them a series of questions and pretend to use their "Personometer" to guess the sucker's astrological sign and birthday. For Mofo the Psychic Gorilla, the sucker draws a standard playing card, which the owner underhandedly inputs into the game. Mofo then asks the sucker several questions, also encouraging them to lie, and pretends to guess the card.

=== Desert Bus ===
Desert Bus is an eight-hour ride along a straight, empty road.

In Desert Bus, the player drives a bus along a straight road between Tucson, Arizona, and Las Vegas. There are no other vehicles, and the scenery consists only of dead trees and bushes. The player can open the doors at occasional bus stops, although no passengers will get on. At a top speed of 45 miles per hour (72 km/h) and a route length of 360 miles (580 km), one ride takes eight hours in real-time. The bus automatically veers to the right, requiring the player to regularly counteract it, and the game cannot be paused. Completing a drive between the two cities grants the player one point and the option to turn around and travel the route in the other direction. When the player drives the bus off the road, it gets stuck in the sand, overheats, and must be towed back to the previous stop in real-time. In a planned competition, the highest-scoring player would have joined Penn & Teller on a real trip from Tucson to Las Vegas in a party bus and a subsequent visit to the Rio hotel and casino.

=== Scams: Buzz Bombers and Sun Scorcher ===
Buzz Bombers is a shoot 'em up in the style of Space Invaders. The two players control Barry and Marshall and must shoot approaching animals to gain points, while hitting larvae incurs a score penalty. During gameplay, the owner can choose to covertly give either player a disadvantage, resulting in increased appearances of larvae and enemy projectiles on their side of the screen. Sun Scorcher, a space-themed shoot 'em up, claims to feature Thermo-Graphics that could pose a danger to the players. The game repeatedly features an enemy mothership that emits Thermo-Graphics when defeated. When the owner activates the scam, the third defeat of the mothership causes the game to play the sound of electric arcing and show static. The owner should then act out being electrocuted by the game or pretend that the other player broke the television.

=== Smoke and Mirrors ===
Smoke and Mirrors is a beat 'em up in the style of Double Dragon. The player controls Penn & Teller on their quest to take down the magician duo of Stinkbomb & Rot (a parody of Siegfried & Roy), who have convinced the population that magic is real. In place of punches, Penn & Teller shoot playing cards to defeat enemies. Debbie Harry and Lou Reed are also featured, with Reed appearing in the "Impossible" mode to immediately defeat the player characters.

== Development ==
Penn & Teller's Smoke and Mirrors was developed by Absolute Entertainment, which also planned to publish it. Before the game's production, the company had been in a bad financial state, and one of its games, Goofy's Hysterical History Tour (1993), had built up a large unsold inventory that would have cost Absolute Entertainment millions of dollars to withdraw from customs. Around this time, the producer Barry Marx, who knew Jillette, conceived a game revolving around Penn & Teller. While they had previously received several video game pitches, Absolute Entertainment was the first to offer them direct involvement with the production. The duo designed the game with Marx and worked on it for seven weeks—with six-to-eight-hour sessions on three or four days per week—during mid-1993. They spent the majority of their time on the Smoke and Mirrors minigame. The television producer Eddie Gorodetsky came up with the idea for Desert Bus as an overly realistic and non-violent game, a response to Janet Reno, the United States Attorney General and an opponent of violence in video games. Some time later, Penn & Teller recorded their full-motion video sequences in a temporary blue screen studio at Absolute Entertainment's New Jersey headquarters. According to Mark Morris, one of the programmers, "Desert Bus took like, five minutes to program". The characters for the Smoke and Mirrors minigame were rotoscoped. Glen Schofield was the art director and Morris credited him with managing the interdisciplinary dynamic between the teams. Absolute Entertainment chose to develop for the Sega CD because it was the only platform the developers were familiar with. Gary Stockdale acted as the composer.

Penn & Teller announced the game for the Sega CD at the 1994 Consumer Electronics Show (CES). Absolute Entertainment sought to release it during the 1994 Christmas season. Following a series of delays, the game was rescheduled for April 1, 1995 (April Fools' Day). At the CES in early 1995, the company announced a PC version of the game, which would have been its first release for the platform. At the show, Marx and Absolute Entertainment's president, Garry Kitchen, appeared on the stage alongside Penn & Teller. Morris was a vocal supporter of the company's adoption of Windows 95 and believed the PC user base better represented the target audience for a Penn & Teller product. Absolute Entertainment additionally revealed a 3DO version at E3 1995 in May. Although the Sega CD version was finished in time for its intended release, Absolute Entertainment could not afford to release it, and the development of the PC and 3DO versions stalled. The delivery date for the former was changed to April 15, which also was not met. Press copies of the Sega CD version were sent to reviewers around May 1995. The game was later scheduled for July 1995 on the Sega CD, for October 1995 on PCs, and for early 1996 on the 3DO. As Absolute Entertainment ceased operations and laid off most employees in late 1995, all versions of Penn & Teller's Smoke and Mirrors were put on indefinite hold. According to Teller, "the format was dead" by this time, and the duo was unable to find a party interested in acquiring the game.

== Reception ==
Reception

Review scores
| Publication | Score |
|---|---|
| Game Informer | 4.25/10 |
| GamePro | 16.5/20 |
| Entertainment Weekly | B |
| VideoGame Advisor | C+ |
| VideoGames | 6/10 |

Penn & Teller's Smoke and Mirrors received mixed reviews. Captain Squideo, reviewing it for GamePro, noted that the controls needed to efficiently play tricks were complicated, although their correct use was satisfying once learned. They lamented an inconsistent graphical quality, where the video sequences stood out positively while the minigames looked "standard at best". Ken Badziak of Electronic Gaming Monthly shared this sentiment, while Dan Vebber of VideoGames faulted the graphics in general. Captain Squideo commended the compilation for its "sharp and clear" sound. Badziak regarded Desert Bus as the best feature but was unsure about the compilation's overall appeal. Zach Meston wrote for VideoGame Advisor that Desert Bus was "hysterical", whereas Vebber called it "brilliant in concept", even if boring. Vebber and Entertainment Weekly's Bob Strauss found little replay value in the compilation, while the reviewer for Mean Machines Sega labeled it a "crap idea" that should be avoided. Three writers for Game Informer concurred that the game had little long-term appeal for players who are not big fans of Penn & Teller.

== Legacy ==
Because Penn & Teller's Smoke and Mirrors was never officially released, press copies became valuable collector's items, even if they were empty boxes. Meston rediscovered his press copy in December 2000 and soon came into contact with Michael Thomasson of Good Deal Games, which had released several previously canceled Sega CD games. Thomasson said in 2003 that it took Good Deal Games and its partner OlderGames two and a half years "to get the licence at a good price". However, they were ultimately unsuccessful in multiple attempts to negotiate a publishing agreement with Penn & Teller and the lawyers managing Absolute Entertainment's assets, and Penn & Teller subsequently abandoned the talks, citing that they had another video game in development. Thomasson had given up on his endeavor to release the game by mid-2005. In September 2005, the video game archivist Frank Cifaldi obtained a backup of a review copy and published a review on the Something Awful forums, eventually adding a torrent file to distribute it. After this torrent became defunct, a new download was provided by the website Waxy in early 2006.

=== Desert Bus for Hope ===
Morgan VanHumbeck, a member of the comedy group LoadingReadyRun, became aware of Penn & Teller's Smoke and Mirrors through Waxy in 2006. Paul Saunders, the group's co-founder, wanted LoadingReadyRun to use Desert Bus as part of a sketch, while another member, James Turner, sought to use their online presence to raise money for the charity Child's Play. These ideas were combined into a livestream of a Desert Bus gameplay marathon held to benefit the charity. The event, called Desert Bus for Hope, was held in November 2007. Four rotating players handled the bus for 108 hours and, during one attempt, scored a record five points before crashing. The event raised US$22,805 in donations, including $500 from each of Penn & Teller. Desert Bus for Hope subsequently became an annual event, raising a cumulative $3 million by 2015 and $6 million by 2019. The event is credited with preserving the game's legacy. A French version, Desert Bus de l'Espoir, was launched in 2013 to benefit the Secours Populaire Français charity.

=== Remakes of Desert Bus ===
During the fifth Desert Bus for Hope event in November 2011, Amateur Pixels released Android and iOS versions of Desert Bus for $0.99, with all proceeds also going to charity. Shiny Shoe recreated Desert Bus in virtual reality (VR) as Desert Bus VR, released for free for Oculus Rift headsets in November 2014. A free homebrew version of Desert Bus exists for the Wii. Demakes for long-discontinued consoles were released through Desert Bus 2600 by Clever Machine Studios for the Atari 2600 in 2013 and an Intellivision version by Freewheeling Games in 2016. Another free VR remake, also called Desert Bus VR, was developed by Dinosaur Games and published in November 2017 by Gearbox Software via Steam for the Oculus Rift and HTC Vive. In 2019, this version was rated by PEGI for the PlayStation 4, indicating a future release for the platform. The "Desert Limo" game mode in the 2014 game Roundabout and the 2018 user-created map "Revenant Bus" for Doom II pay homage to Desert Bus.
