= Strip search (disambiguation) =

Strip search is the technique of searching for concealed weaponry or contraband by clothing removal.

Strip search may also refer to:

- Strip Search (film), a 2004 drama film
- Strip Search (TV series), a reality television series
- Strip Search (web series), a reality web series produced by Penny Arcade
- Stripsearch (song), a 1998 song by Faith No More
