= Scarlet Hollow =

2021 video game

- Official art depicting (from left to right) Wayne, Tabitha, Stella, and Kaneeka
- Developer: Black Tabby Games
- Publisher: Black Tabby Games
- Programmer: Tony Howard-Arias
- Artist: Abby Howard
- Writers: Abby Howard, Tony Howard-Arias
- Composer: Brandon Boone
- Engine: Ren'Py
- Platforms: Linux; MacOS; Microsoft Windows
- Release: June 11, 2021 (early access): Episode 1/Demo September 25, 2020; Episode 2/Early Access June 11, 2021; Episode 3 March 7, 2022; Episode 4 December 2, 2022; Episode 5 February 13, 2026; Episode 6/7 TBA
- Genres: Visual novel, Role-playing game
- Mode: Single-player

Scarlet Hollow is an episodic visual novel developed and published by Black Tabby Games. It entered early access on June 11, 2021, for Linux, MacOS, and Microsoft Windows systems. As of 2026, five episodes have been released out of a planned seven.

== Gameplay ==
Scarlet Hollow is a visual novel with RPG elements. The player chooses the protagonist's name, gender, and background, alongside two additional traits (out of seven options) that each unlock unique choices and dialogue options, including the ability to suffer no consequences in one of the major choices at the end of each chapter. These traits are "Book Smart", "Street Smart", "Talk to Animals", "Hot", "Keen Eye", "Powerful", and "Mystical". There also exists a "Hardcore Mode" (unlockable as a New Game+ option) that allows the player to pick three traits, but disallows bypassing major choices.

The player influences the story with their decisions and dialogue choices, though some major story beats remain unchanged. Some options are labeled with the word "(Explore)", which in most cases means selecting them will not progress the story. Non-player characters' perception of the protagonist is dependent on a hidden five-variable system (open/closed, agreeable/adversarial, insightful/dull, bold/passive, and reliable/unreliable) that shifts based on their responses. At certain points, the player may have the option to begin a romantic relationship with certain NPCs, though doing so will lock out other romance options for the remainder of the playthrough.

== Plot ==
Gameplay screenshot.

The protagonist is invited to the funeral of their estranged Aunt Pearlanne by her daughter Tabitha, the new head of the once-affluent Scarlet family. They travel to Scarlet Hollow, North Carolina, a small town supported by the Scarlet-owned coal mines. The protagonist meets several residents including cryptozoology YouTuber Stella. She invites them to film a video with her in the woods. The two discover that fleshy creatures called "Ditchlings" have been abducting small animals and laying their eggs in them. The encounter can end with the death of local farmer Duke Tremaine or Stella's pug Gretchen. The protagonist also encounters Sam Wayne, a seemingly supernatural man whose head is covered by a veil.

On Day 2, the protagonist investigates the coal mines with Stella and her friend Kaneeka, potentially learning from the miners that Wayne is a former coal miner and Tabitha's ex-boyfriend. They also meet Kaneeka's mother Sybil, an old woman with knowledge of the Ditchlings and other supernatural secrets. As they leave, they spot town librarian Oscar's daughter Rosalina sneaking into a condemned mine with her friends. Inside, Rosalina vents her frustration with Oscar moving her out of their house as he claims it is haunted. The protagonist is drawn to a mysterious stone seal and has a vision of their ancestor Enoch Scarlet ignoring safety issues with the mine, resulting in a deadly mine collapse. Presently, ghostly creatures appear as the mine begins to collapse, and the protagonist is faced with helping Rosalina escape or going back to help her friends Becka and Alexis.

On Day 3, the protagonist has dinner with Kaneeka and Stella's friend Reese, a chronically ill young man who is mostly confined to his house. His mother Dr. Kelly cares for him and restricts his contact with the outside world, causing him to resent her. The group meets up at Oscar's house and find it is haunted by the ghost of Charles Shaw Jr., the lover of the protagonist's ancestor Edwardine Scarlet who was later killed by her. Charles demands that either Tabitha or the protagonist repay their family's debt to him by sacrificing years of their own lives and becoming middle-aged. Alternately, the protagonist can abandon the ghost and leave the library haunted. Either way, another stone seal is discovered in the library basement.

On Day 4, the miners have begun striking due to recent events. The protagonist spends the day with Kaneeka searching for Stella, who disappeared after the events at the library. When Kaneeka returns home, the protagonist secretly visits Reese, enticed by a seal in his mother Joan's clinic, and may discover that she has been treating him with the deadly poison ricin for years, causing his illnesses while preventing him from transforming. Once his dose wears off Reese is enraged by his mother's deception and transforms into a beast. The encounter can end with Reese's death, his continued imprisonment, his escape, or Joan's death. The protagonist may find Stella in the aftermath. That night, they are visited again by Wayne, who instructs them to investigate the Scarlet estate's sealed-off wings.

On Day 5, the protagonist investigates the forbidden wing. They can explore the collapsing rooms of the manor, discovering clues that help to piece together the family's turbulent past, and finally arrive at a dungeon set up for a prisoner. Leaving the house in a panic, they may turn to several characters for help, and eventually find their way to the Calloway and Tremaine farmsteads outside of town, where another seal is located. They arrive at a confrontation between local recluse Julius Calloway and the Tremaine family, during which several characters may die. Afterward, they are drawn into a vision by Sybil, in reality an immortal witch who assisted Enoch, who tries to explain her plan and ally with them. They may choose to turn down Sybil or let her consume Kaneeka to gain more power.

== Development ==
Scarlet Hollow is developed by Black Tabby Games, an independent game studio consisting solely of married couple Abby Howard and Tony Howard-Arias, originally founded in Boston before moving to Toronto. They ran a crowdfunding campaign on Kickstarter in 2020 for the game. Scarlet Hollow's influences includes Life Is Strange, Twin Peaks, and Gravity Falls.

Episode 1 was released as a demo in 2020, with Episode 2 releasing the following year.

Following the release of Episode 3, the couple decided to release a second, non-episodic game that would support the remainder of the Scarlet Hollow. That game, Slay the Princess, released in 2023 and proved successful enough to fund the rest of Scarlet Hollow's development cycle. Episode 4 released in late 2022.

An update expanding existing chapters of the game released in March 2025. Episode 5 was released on February 13, 2026.

== Reception ==
Reviewing Episode 1, PC Gamer's Emma Matthews praised the game's setting and implementation of the trait system. Rachel Weber of GamesRadar+ wrote positively of the game's hand-drawn art and dialogue, saying, "The story has echoes of Shirley Jackson, with the snappy dialogue of a Netflix hit, and the art style holds it all together like a beautiful spiderweb spun with digital ink." Writing for The Escapist, Amy Davidson praised the first episode's tone and pacing. CGMagazine scored the episode an 8/10 while focusing praise on the characters and setting. John Walker of Kotaku named the early access version of Scarlet Hollow as one of 2021's best games. He also listed Episodes 3 and 4 among 2022's best games.
