= A/X-101 =

1994 video game

- North American cover art
- Developers: Micronet; Genki
- Publishers: JP: Sega; NA: Absolute Entertainment
- Platform: Sega CD
- Release: JP: March 25, 1994; NA: 1994
- Genre: Rail shooter
- Mode: Single-player

A/X-101 (エーエックス101) is a 1994 rail shooter video game developed by Micronet for the Sega CD.

== Story ==
In the future date of 2500, humanity has reached its zenith in space travel and peace, but after making contact with alien life for the first time, Earth is soon attacked and nearly conquered by a war-driven alien race called the Gurzons. The Earth's Defense Force discover the Gurzon's enemy resides on the distant alien planet Prism, who made contact with Earth as a warning against the oncoming Gurzon invasion. Further investigation leads to the discovery of a computer upgrade system located on Prism called the A/X-101, a weapon program that promises to liberate Earth from the Gurzon's grip. Earth Defense sends four of its best fighter pilots - Bob, Kelly, Chris and their Captain (the player) - to travel to Prism, retrieve the A/X-101 and use it against all of the Gurzon's planetary bases.

== Gameplay ==
Players assume the role of one of the four deployed EDF Starfighters on their way to planet Prism. The player ship has only two weapons: Laser Cannons and Fusion Warheads (smart bombs). While Laser Cannon fire is unlimited, the laser's power weakens with continuous use and must be recharged for full strength blasts. Fusion Warheads will wipe the screen clean of smaller enemies, though will only damage larger/stronger enemies and the ship can only stock five at a time. The player can replenish their bomb stock by way of accumulating higher scores. After the EDF Starfighters download the A/X-101, the ship's shield increases to 120% and their laser fire increases in strength. The ship also has an energy shield which serves as a health bar. Players had no lives and only three continues after their ship is destroyed in combat.

== Release and reception ==
Reception

Review scores
| Publication | Score |
|---|---|
| Famitsu | 7/10, 8/10, 7/10, 6/10 |
| Mega | 4% |
| Mega Fun (DE) | 16% |
| Sega-16 | 3/10 |

A/X-101 was released in Japan for the Sega CD on March 25, 1994. Mega reviewer Andy Dyer wrote that "it took me longer to write this 400-word review than it did to finish the game".
