= The Adventures of Rocky and Bullwinkle and Friends (video game) =

1992 video game

- NES cover art
- Developers: Imagineering; Radical Entertainment (NES)
- Publishers: T•HQ Software; Absolute Entertainment (SNES, MD/GEN)
- Directors: W. Marshall Rogers (SNES, MD/GEN)
- Producers: Daniel James Kitchen (SNES, MD/GEN)
- Designers: Barry Marx, Bruce Plotnick, Glen Schofield, Gregory A. Faccone, Tak Lau, Daniel James Kitchen (SNES, MD/GEN)
- Programmers: Chris Lippmann (NES); Bruce Plotnick, Dennis Benson, Roger Booth (SNES, MD/GEN)
- Artists: Ed Konyha (NES); Ross Harris, John-Marc Grob, Glen Schofield (SNES, MD/GEN)
- Composers: Paul Wilkinson (NES); Mark Van Hecke (Game Boy/Genesis/SNES)
- Platforms: Game Boy, NES, Super NES, Mega Drive/Genesis
- Release: October 1992 (Game Boy); December 1992 (NES); June 1993 (SNES); September 1993 (Genesis)
- Genre: Platform
- Mode: Single-player

The Adventures of Rocky and Bullwinkle and Friends is a video game released by THQ between 1992 and 1993 for Game Boy, NES, SNES, and Sega Genesis adapted from The Adventures of Rocky and Bullwinkle and Friends TV series.

== Plot ==
In the NES version, Bullwinkle learns that his ancestor left sums of money for him to collect. Rocky and Bullwinkle need to go through perilous levels that feature their enemies Boris and Natasha, before they could reach the home of the moose's ancestor.

In the Genesis, SNES, and Game Boy versions, three artifacts are stolen from a museum. It is up to Rocky and Bullwinkle to get them back.

== Gameplay ==
The NES version includes a countryside house, a futuristic city, a train, a desert, and a mansion. The player can switch between Rocky and Bullwinkle during a game. Bullwinkle can ram into enemies while Rocky can fly. Both characters can hurl bombs at foes.

The Genesis and SNES versions consist of seven levels that take players through various locales: A Swiss Alps-style mountain, a cavern, a mine, a submarine, a haunted ship, a port town, and a castle. Instead of bombs, the title characters hurl mooseberries and acorns at enemies. Mini-games are available at certain points that allows players to collect extra lives. The mini-games are "Peabody and Sherman", where players control Sherman and blow bubble gum bubbles to clog a dragon's mouth, and "Dudley Do-Right", where players ride a horse and avoid an ever-approaching train which is driven by Snidely Whiplash.

The Game Boy version only has three levels, although generally with multiple sections. The first level, Frostbite Falls, has the player control Bullwinkle. The second, on the Moon, uses Rocky, and the final one, the Abominable Manor, uses Bullwinkle again. Before the final section, a bonus level that has Bullwinkle running to the end of a football field to catch Rocky, avoiding and head-butting football players on the way, can grant the player an extra life upon completion. The final section has a time limit to defeat the Fearless Leader and rescue your friend. Dying three times sends the player back to the first section of the level. Despite the absence thereof, the game label still showed the "Friends" (e.g. Dudley Do-Right).

The Game Boy version's level design was later reused for The Ren & Stimpy Show: Space Cadet Adventures (also developed by Imagineering).

== Reception ==
Reception

Review scores
Publication	Score
Consoles +	75% (SNES)
Electronic Gaming Monthly	4/10 (SMD)
GamePro	11/20 (NES); 12/20 (SMD)
Hyper	51/100 (SNES)
Nintendo Power	12/20 (GB); 9.5/20 (NES); 10.6/20 (SNES)
Total!	39% (GB)
Video Games (DE)	29% (GB)
VideoGames & Computer Entertainment	6/10 (SMD)
Electronic Games	80% (SMD)
Super Control	57% (SNES)

Reception varied among its differing versions. The NES version received mostly negative reviews for its poor graphics and music, while reception for the SNES and Genesis versions were mixed. When reviewing the NES version, GamePro stated that the slow-paced action may not appeal to experienced NES players but the absence of continues may provide an interesting challenge. The reviewer also stated that fans of the TV series might play the game for nostalgic reasons.
