= Operation Armored Liberty =

2003 shooter video game

- Developer: Eastridge Technology
- Publisher: Majesco Sales, Inc.
- Platform: Game Boy Advance
- Release: NA: November 9, 2003
- Genre: Shooter
- Mode: Single-player

Operation Armored Liberty is a shooter video game for the Game Boy Advance.

== Gameplay ==
Operation Armored Liberty places the player in command of the military’s armored defense vehicle, the M1A1 Abrams Battle Tank. The player must defend against T72s, mobile S.C.U.D. launchers, and helicopter gunships across the desert.

On the title screen, players can enter a password to continue a previously completed level. On the Map Screen, the entire battlefield area can be viewed, displaying enemy tanks and helicopters, SCUDS, mission objectives, allied bases, and minefields.

The M1A1 Abrams Battle Tank is equipped with three types of offensive weapons and one defensive weapon:

- 120mm Cannon: Enemy opponents need to be hit a number of times with these explosive shells.
- Laser-guided Cannon: This laser-guided shell, locked onto an enemy when the weapon’s sight is flashing, almost always guarantees a kill.
- Smoke Canisters: A defense system released to fill the area with a smoke cover, which blinds the enemies' visual reference.
- 7.62mm Machine Guns: A weapon system most effective at close range, particularly against enemy helicopters.

The M1A1 Abrams Battle Tank includes a system and instrumentation dashboard. The cockpit features:

- Message Center: Displays the score.
- Speedometer: Monitors tank speed.
- Fuel indicator: Tracks fuel levels.
- On-board computer system: Indicates the vertical position of the cannon, the range of the enemy, the current mission, and the number of enemies remaining.

During a mission, players receive orders to attack an objective. To fulfill these orders, the tank must be maneuvered to the same sector as the objective. Once in position, the battle begins.

== Development and release ==
The game was developed by Eastridge Technology and published by Majesco Sales, Inc. for the Game Boy Advance on November 9, 2003, as a budget title at the price of $19.99 and was distributed through major retailers including Amazon, Walmart, and K·B Toys

== Reception ==
Reception

Aggregate score
Aggregator	Score
GameRankings	40%

Review scores
Publication	Score
GameSpot	4.2/10
Nintendo Power	1.9/5
Games Chart	20/100

GameSpot noted that Majesco ported Super Battletank fairly well to the handheld, but noticed that they made no effort to improve some of the weaker aspects of the original game. The reviewer found photo-realistic appearance of the tanks and helicopters, but heavily criticized the featureless terrain, choppy animations and dumb AI. Nintendo Power stated that the battle action is simple and initially fun, but becomes less exciting as the player advances. Games Chart found it helpful that players can drive in map mode to reach enemies faster. However, the reviewer criticized poorly designed environments, absence of in-game music, choppy animations and repetitive missions.
