= Walt Disney World Quest: Magical Racing Tour =

2000 video game

- North American PlayStation cover art
- Developer: Crystal Dynamics (Note: Ported to Dreamcast by Prolific Publishing and Microsoft Windows by LTI Gray Matter. Prolific also developed the Game Boy Color version of the game.)
- Publisher: Eidos Interactive (Note: Activision published the Game Boy Color version and Disney Interactive published the Microsoft Windows version.)
- Director: Glen Schofield
- Producer: Steve Papoutsis
- Designer: Christoper A. Tremmel
- Programmers: Adrian Longland; Jeffrey McArthur
- Composer: Jim Hedges
- Platforms: Dreamcast, Game Boy Color, Windows, PlayStation
- Release: PlayStation: NA: March 23, 2000; EU: June 23, 2000; Dreamcast: NA: July 19, 2000; EU: September 1, 2000; Game Boy Color: NA: December 7, 2000; EU: December 15, 2000; Windows: NA: January 24, 2001
- Genre: Racing
- Modes: Single-player, multiplayer

Walt Disney World Quest: Magical Racing Tour, sometimes mislabeled as Disney MT Racing or Walt Disney World: Magical Racing Quest, is a 2000 kart racing video game developed by Crystal Dynamics. Set within the real-life Walt Disney World, the game centers on racing around tracks that are inspired and based on attractions at the resort's theme parks to acquire missing parts for the park's fireworks machine, which was accidentally destroyed by Chip 'n' Dale while they were gathering acorns.

== Gameplay ==
The game consists of normal kart racing gameplay, racing in three-lap races around tracks inspired by Big Thunder Mountain Railroad, Blizzard Beach, Dinosaur, Rock 'n' Roller Coaster, the Haunted Mansion, the Jungle Cruise, Tomorrowland Speedway, Space Mountain, and Pirates of the Caribbean to win parts for the fireworks machine in the game's story mode. Completing the story will also unlock a track inspired by Splash Mountain. However, on tracks inspired by Test Track, Typhoon Lagoon, and Hollywood Studios, players must collect thirty coins around the driving areas of these tracks within four minutes in order to complete their events.

The game features 13 playable racers. With the exceptions of Chip 'n' Dale (both of whom appear in their Rescue Rangers outfits) and Jiminy Cricket (a NPC who serves as the guide and host), the game's cast are original characters created especially for the game.

== Development ==
Eidos Interactive and Disney Interactive first announced the collaboration in December 1999.

== Reception ==
Reception

Aggregate scores
Aggregator	Score			
Aggregator	Dreamcast	GBC	PC	PS
GameRankings	66%	50%	N/A	75%
Metacritic	65/100	N/A	N/A	N/A

Review scores
Publication	Score			
Publication	Dreamcast	GBC	PC	PS
AllGame	N/A	N/A	2/5	3/5
CNET Gamecenter	6/10	N/A	N/A	6/10
Electronic Gaming Monthly	5.5/10	N/A	N/A	4/10
Eurogamer	8/10	N/A	N/A	8/10
Game Informer	7.25/10	N/A	N/A	6.5/10
GameFan	78%	N/A	N/A	85%
GameRevolution	C	N/A	N/A	N/A
GameSpot	7.5/10	N/A	N/A	7.7/10
GameSpy	4/10	N/A	N/A	N/A
IGN	6.3/10	4/10	N/A	7.5/10
Jeuxvideo.com	N/A	16/20	13/20	15/20
Next Generation	2/5	N/A	N/A	N/A
Nintendo Power	N/A	5.5/10	N/A	N/A
Official U.S. PlayStation Magazine	N/A	N/A	N/A	2.5/5

The Dreamcast version received "mixed" reviews according to the review aggregation website Metacritic.

Reviewers of IGN and Eurogamer praised the presentation of the PlayStation (IGN) and Dreamcast versions (Eurogamer), and how the developers were able to recreate popular attractions in-game, and the "Disney-esque" charm it has. Both also berated the difficulty (with the CPU racers being so hard to beat), some of the graphics, and the fact that the developers only used a small sound sample from each attraction and looped it, which got annoying quickly.

A reviewer of GameSpot called the Dreamcast version a good entry to the kart racing genre, while also bringing attention to its many similarities to Mario Kart. The amount of detail put into the tracks and the sound were also praised, but the reviewer was disappointed by the game's short play length. Greg Orlando of NextGen said of the same console version: "Video game behemoth Eidos has fallen prey to the notion that wacky characters plus karts plus odd power-ups automatically equals good racing fun. It doesn't". Nintendo Power gave the Game Boy Color version a mixed review, nearly three months before its U.S. release date.

== See also ==
- List of Disney video games
