= Super Battletank 2 =

1994 video game

- North American cover art
- Developer(s): Absolute Entertainment
- Publisher(s): NA/EU: Absolute Entertainment; JP: Pack-In-Video
- Designer(s): Garry Kitchen; David Lubar; Mark Morris; Carol Albert; Dan Kitchen; Alex DeMeo
- Programmer(s): Garry Kitchen; David Lubar; Mark Morris; Chi Y. Chen
- Artist(s): Jesse Kapili; Glen Schofield; John Cassells; Ray Bradley; Dan Peters
- Composer(s): Jim Wallace
- Platform(s): Super NES
- Release: NA: January 1994; JP: May 27, 1994; EU: August 8, 1994
- Genre(s): Tank simulation
- Mode(s): Single-player

Super Battletank 2 is a 1994 tank simulation video game developed and published by Absolute Entertainment for the Super Nintendo Entertainment System. The Japanese Super Famicom version was published by Pack-In-Video.

== Summary ==
This video game is the sequel to Super Battletank, where the player controls a M1A2 Battletank. There are 16 missions, all located in the Middle East. Using radar, the player must scout out groups of enemy tanks and use the primary turret to take out infantrymen, jeeps, SCUD missiles, and armored personnel carriers. The Phalanx machine gun is used to take down enemy air threats like helicopters. Smoke screens can make the player temporarily invisible to enemy radar, turning them into a major threat. Players can also summon threats from the sky in the form of supply drops and airstrikes.

== Reception ==
Reception

Review scores
Publication	Score
Electronic Gaming Monthly	35/50
Total!	70%

Electronic Gaming Monthly gave a positive review, citing a new features and weapons in the game.

== See also ==
- Battle Tank
- Battlezone
- Robot Tank
