= R.C. Grand Prix =

1990 video game

- European Master System box art
- Developer: Imagineering
- Producer: Dan Kitchen
- Designers: Scott Marshall; Dan Kitchen
- Programmer: Scott Marshall
- Artists: Bill Wentworth; Jesse Kapili
- Composer: Scott Marshall
- Platforms: Master System; Game Gear
- Release: NA: June 1990; EU: 1990
- Genre: Racing
- Modes: Single-player, multiplayer

R.C. Grand Prix is an isometric racing game for the Master System and Game Gear. It was released in 1990.

== Gameplay ==
R.C. Grand Prix is an isometric racing game. Depicting 1:10 off-road racing, the player controls a radio-controlled buggy and races against three other cars to become the grand champion. The player has to play through 10 increasingly difficult stages and buy new parts for the controlled car from the prize money awarded from each stage. If the player is placed last in a stage or does not complete the stage within the time-limit, the game is over.

It is possible to play this game in multi-player mode with up to four players. The players play through each stage, one at a time, and the order of play is based on the current standings in the game. The game also features a drag race bonus stage which is only available in multi-player mode. Here, two players race each other for some bonus prize money.

Reception

Review score
Publication	Score
IGN	6/10
