= Abby Howard =

American webcomic artist

- Born: Abigail Howard; August 3, 1992 (age 34); Jackson, Mississippi, U.S.
- Occupations: Comics creator, video game developer
- Years active: 2019–present
- Spouse: Tony Arias
- Website: blacktabbygames.com abbyhowardart.myportfolio.com

Abigail Howard (born August 3, 1992) is an American webcomic creator and video game developer from Charlotte, North Carolina. She is the co-founder of indie game studio Black Tabby Games, and created the comics Junior Scientist Power Hour, The Last Halloween, and The Crossroads At Midnight.

== Biography ==
Howard was born on August 3, 1992, in Jackson, Mississippi and grew up in Charlotte, North Carolina. She attended McGill University in Montreal, majoring in Biology with a specialization in Evolution. She enjoyed learning about life history, but did not enjoy the math, chemistry, and microbiology classes that were a part of her degree. She describes herself as “a wretched student, all I wanted to do was draw pictures.” She started Junior Scientist Power Hour in the summer of 2012. With only 27 comics to her name, she entered Strip Search. Despite placing second, she was able to quit school and become a full-time cartoonist, as noted in her comic "Screaming Constantly". Howard is married to Tony Arias, with whom she co-founded the indie game studio Black Tabby Games. The couple live in Toronto.

== Works ==
=== Junior Scientist Power Hour ===
Junior Scientist Power Hour was a weekly episodic webcomic by Howard, usually focusing on topics such as her daily life and parodies of pop culture. From the Facebook page, "it's about her incredibly interesting life with her cat, and sometimes it is also about other things." The panels tend to be hand-drawn black and white; however, there is one notable exception. The band members in the strip “Tupper Ware Remix Party” are brightly colored and subsequent strips featuring them are in color as well. Abby's art style is influenced by that of Jhonen Vasquez. She was especially influenced by his comic Johnny the Homicidal Maniac. Howard describes herself primarily as a traditional artist, but she does use digital art for coloring panels.

=== Strip Search ===
Howard was selected as one of the twelve contestants for Penny Arcade's webcomic based reality competition show Strip Search. She was the only contestant who competed using traditional media. Howard built up a following, who called themselves “Team Tangent.”

=== The Last Halloween ===
After competing in Strip Search, Howard created a Kickstarter for her next project, The Last Halloween. It was pitched as an episodic horror-comedy comic, and was crowdfunded within 20 minutes. The Kickstarter raised $126,507 of the $9,000 goal.

The Last Halloween began October 8, 2013 (September 18, 2013 for Kickstarter backers). While the art style is similar to Junior Scientist Power Hour, it features more detailed illustrations, locations, and a continuing story. The comic is influenced by horror films, which Howard is admittedly a fan of.

The story follows a young girl named Mona who finds herself tasked with saving the world when billions of monsters suddenly spill into the human world one Halloween night. Howard first conceptualized the story in high school, and pitched it for the finale of Strip Search. Although she lost, she chose to launch a Kickstarter for it anyway, and was successful. She describes her comic as partly being a response to uninspiring horror media, such as bland male power fantasies with uncreative monsters and hollow plots. Howard has the entire story written out in advance; she prefers this method of story-telling, as she can insert Easter eggs and foreshadowing.

=== Scarlet Hollow ===
In 2019, Howard and her boyfriend (later husband) Tony Arias co-founded Black Tabby Games, an indie game studio responsible for episodic horror visual novel Scarlet Hollow. The first episode of Scarlet Hollow released in September 2020, the second released in June 2021, the third released in March 2022.

Scarlet Hollow follows a customizable protagonist as they meet their estranged family for the first time in the titular town. Visiting for their aunt's funeral, they find themselves caught between reconciling with their cousin, Tabitha, and solving a supernatural mystery tied to the town's past.

After releasing its first episode, Scarlet Hollow went on to a successful Kickstarter, where the game hit its initial funding goal in the first day. Following the Kickstarter, Scarlet Hollow was also a finalist in the AT&T Unlocked Games awards, where it received both the runner-up and audience choice prizes.

The game has also received critical praise, with John Walker of Kotaku describing it as "one of the best narrative games [he's] played."

=== Slay the Princess ===
In 2022, Black Tabby Games announced their second game, entitled Slay the Princess. Like Scarlet Hollow, it is a horror-based visual novel, and follows a nameless protagonist ordered by an unseen narrator to kill the princess imprisoned within the woods.

Black Tabby Games released a demo of the game for Steam Next Fest. They were present at PAX East 2023, where they debuted an extended demo. The full game launched on October the 23rd of that year.

=== Other ===
Howard created the 2016 comic The Portrait of Sal Pullman with writer Lonnie Nadler. She wrote and illustrated the graphic novel Dinosaur Empire!, a volume in the Earth Before Us series from Abrams Books, published August 1, 2017.

Howard co-hosted horror podcast Scared Yet? with cartoonist Kris Straub in 2016 from July to December. Lasting 6 episodes, Straub and Howard discussed horror storytelling, writing advice, personal favorite horror stories, as well as personal experiences with writing horror.

== Awards ==
Year	Nominated work	Category	Result	Notes
2013	The Last Halloween	Ghastly Awards: Best Webcomic	Won	
2019	Ocean Renegades! (Earth Before Us #2): Journey through the Paleozoic Era	EGL Awards: Best in Middle-Grade Graphic Literature (Non-Fiction)	Nominated	
2020	Unhealthy	Cartoonist Studio Prize: Best Web Comic	Nominated	
2020	Scarlet Hollow	AT&T Unlocked Games: Runner Up	Won	
2020	Scarlet Hollow	AT&T Unlocked Games: Gamers' Choice	Won	
2021	The Crossroads at Midnight	2021 Ignatz Awards: Outstanding Collection	Won	
