= Home Improvement: Power Tool Pursuit! =

1994 video game

- Developer: Imagineering
- Publisher: Absolute Entertainment
- Designers: Dan Kitchen; David Crane
- Programmers: Jason Benham (lead programming and design); Andy Rogers; Bill Jannott; David Lubar
- Composers: Dan Foliart; Jim Wallace; Steve Melillo
- Platform: Super NES
- Release: NA: November 1994
- Genre: Platform
- Mode: Single-player

Home Improvement: Power Tool Pursuit! is a 1994 2D platform game, based on the sitcom of the same name, developed by Imagineering and published by Absolute Entertainment for the Super Nintendo Entertainment System. A Sega Genesis version was planned but never released.

== Development ==
Home Improvement: Power Tool Pursuit! was published by Absolute Entertainment, which Disney hired to produce the game after it completed another game based on a Disney property, Goofy's Hysterical History Tour (1993). It was presented at the 1994 winter Consumer Electronics Show.

== Critical reception ==
Reception

Review scores
Publication	Score
Electronic Gaming Monthly	7/10, 7/10, 6/10, 6/10, 7/10
EP Daily	7/10
GamePro	14/20
VideoGames & Computer Entertainment	7/10, 6/10, 6/10, 6/10
Electronic Games	B
Entertainment Weekly	C−

Reviews at the time were generally mixed-to-positive. GamePro gave Home Improvement: Power Tool Pursuit! a mixed review, calling it "like Pitfall with power tools". They commented that the game plays well and is easy to pick up on, has solid graphics, but features mediocre music, and concluded that it would be fun for side-scrolling fans and enthusiasts of the TV show, but is not challenging enough for hardcore players. Mike Weigand of Electronic Gaming Monthly called it "an intriguing action title, with some cool weapons and excellent graphics". Less favorable towards the game was Entertainment Weekly, which was turned off by the concept of Tim Allen fighting enemies like dinosaurs and "alien beasties"; and Nintendo Power, claiming that despite its "fun worlds" and many type of attacks, it suffered from "awkward" controls", "poor placement of objects" that artificially increased the difficulty, absence of humor from the TV series, and the fact that the "gameplay never rises above standard jumping, shooting and the collecting of items". The sitcom adaptation's concept of Tim Allen fighting through fantastical enemies such as mummies, dinosaurs and robots led it to appear on several all-time lists of weirdest video games, such as those of PC Magazine and Rolling Stone, in later years.
