= Heavy Shreddin' =

1990 video game

- North American cover art
- Developer(s): Imagineering
- Publisher(s): NA: Parker Brothers; EU: Activision
- Designer(s): John van Ryzin
- Artist(s): Bill Wentworth; Jesse Kapili
- Composer(s): Mark Van Hecke
- Platform(s): NES
- Release: NA: June 1990; EU: 1990
- Genre(s): Snowboarding
- Mode(s): Single-player

Heavy Shreddin' is a snowboarding video game that was released for the Nintendo Entertainment System in 1990. It was released in Europe with the title Snowboard Challenge.

== Gameplay ==
There are three mountains that the player must overcome in order to complete the game. As the player descends the mountain, the terrain becomes more and more difficult to navigate. There are three degrees of difficulty on each of the mountains. The first is novice (marked by a circle), the second is intermediate (marked by a square), and the third is expert (marked by a diamond).

The player starts out with four lives. There are five different events and a total of 18 levels of play. In order to progress to the next event, the player must first successfully complete the event before it. If the player falls or runs out of time a life is taken away. After completing a trail, the player is rewarded with a bonus life. If the player is able to complete all of the trails and events, they will have completed the game.

=== Scoring Points ===
There are several ways in which the player is able to score points in the game. Some of the ways are:

- Avoiding objects, such as trees and flags, by sliding up or down on the screen
- Performing tricks
- Jumping off of ramps and other elevated terrain

The player performs tricks by jumping and then pressing in any direction on the directional pad.

=== The Events ===
1. downhill: In this event the player must avoid hitting objects and falling. It is a timed run, so if the player takes too long, they will be sent back up to the top of the slope. The same goes for falling and colliding into objects.
2. Slalom: The goal of this event is to pass through the flags placed along the slope. If the player fails to get between the pairs of flags they will return to the top of the mountain.
3. Half-pipe: This event is all about points. The player must gain up speed and perform tricks at the peak of either side of the half-pipe.
4. Moguls: In order to pass this event the player must perform tricks to jump over the moguls (bumps in the snow).
5. Backwoods: The last event is mostly a combination of speed, tricks, and survival. It tests everything the player has learned throughout the game. This event is very difficult.
