= Race America =

Alex DeMeo's Race America
- North American cover art
- Developer: Imagineering Inc.
- Publishers: EU: Milton Bradley; NA: Absolute Entertainment
- Designer: Alex DeMeo
- Composer: Mark Van Hecke
- Platform: NES
- Release: EU: 1990; NA: May 1992
- Genre: Arcade racing
- Modes: Single-player; Multiplayer

Alex DeMeo's Race America (also known in Europe as Corvette ZR-1 Challenge) is a racing video game developed by Imagineering and published by Absolute Entertainment for the Nintendo Entertainment System in 1990 in Europe and 1992 in North America. The European version received the Chevrolet license to use its Corvette ZR-1 vehicles while those in the North American version had to be redesigned into vehicles that strongly resembled Dodge Vipers.

== Gameplay ==
The game involves at driving on roads in the United States, at approximately 200 miles (320 km) per hour from Boston to Los Angeles - 2,990 miles (4,810 km) from start to finish. In the 2-player mode, the players race against each other using the same car model, but in different colors. In the single player mode, each player must compete against eight computer-controlled cars across the U.S. The drivers are all fictional and are not based on any racers of the era.
