= Blood Omen 2 =

2002 video game

- Developer: Crystal Dynamics (Note: Ported to Xbox, Windows and GameCube by Nixxes Software)
- Publisher: Eidos Interactive
- Director: Glen Schofield
- Producer: Sam Newman
- Designer: Mike Ellis
- Programmer: Tom Desmarais
- Artist: Steve Ross
- Writers: Bret Robbins; Steve Ross; Carol Wolf
- Composer: Jim Hedges
- Series: Legacy of Kain
- Platforms: PlayStation 2 Xbox; Windows; GameCube
- Release: PlayStation 2, Xbox: NA: March 20, 2002; EU: March 28, 2002; AU: March 29, 2002 (PS2); Windows: NA: March 28, 2002; EU: April 5, 2002; GameCube: NA: December 4, 2002; EU: January 24, 2003
- Genre: Action-adventure
- Mode: Single-player

Blood Omen 2 is a 2002 action-adventure video game developed by Crystal Dynamics and published by Eidos Interactive for the PlayStation 2, Xbox, Windows and GameCube. It is the fourth title in the Legacy of Kain series and is the sequel to the first game in the series, Blood Omen: Legacy of Kain (1996), with Blood Omen's protagonist, the vampire Kain, returning as the central character.

Blood Omen 2 chronologically bridges the stories of the original Blood Omen and Legacy of Kain: Soul Reaver (1999), but it takes place in an alternate timeline created by the events of Soul Reaver 2 (2001). Centuries after Blood Omen, Kain is opposed by traitorous vampires and the minions of The Sarafan Lord, and sets out to continue his ascent to power.

While Crystal Dynamics' Soul Reaver team began to produce Soul Reaver 2, a secondary crew started work on Blood Omen 2 in 1999. They sought to create a more action-focused entry in contrast to the Soul Reaver games' emphasis on puzzle-solving. The final product was a commercial success, becoming a Sony's "Greatest Hits" title, but received average reception, with critics citing its lower production values and lack of innovation relative to the Soul Reaver games as flaws.

== Gameplay ==
Gameplay is presented in 3D and is a combination of combat and puzzle solving. Health is represented by two vials - a red vial symbolizing total hit points, and a blue vial which is an indicator as to how long it will take to increase overall health. Lost health can be regained by draining the blood of a downed enemy or civilian. As progression is made throughout the game, several weapons can be attained, such as a broadsword or staff. Weapons have limited durability and will eventually break if used for excessive blocking. If no weapons are selected, claws can be used to attack, as well as abilities, which are gained by killing bosses. These skills help in advancing through sections of the game, as well as puzzles. Most of the abilities - named Dark Gifts in the game - can only be used once the "Rage Meter" has been filled by defeating opponents.

== Plot ==
=== Setting ===
The vampire Kain refused to sacrifice himself to restore the Pillars of Nosgoth at the end of Blood Omen: Legacy of Kain, thus damning the Pillars and the world of Nosgoth to an eternity of depravity and decay. Following his refusal, Kain built a vampire army with Vorador's help and attempted to conquer the world.

Four hundred years after the events of Blood Omen: Legacy of Kain, Kain awakes in Meridian, Nosgoth's industrial capital city. He remembers very little, and is lacking much of his former power. He is greeted by a vampire called Umah, who informs Kain that he has been asleep for two hundred years.

Two hundred years before, Kain's conquest of Nosgoth had been opposed by an army of vampire hunters called the Sarafan Order. The Sarafan Order destroyed Kain's army, and Kain himself was defeated in combat by their leader, the Sarafan Lord who then claimed the Soul Reaver from Kain. In the years since, the Sarafan have imposed harsh martial law on Nosgoth's human population, and started an industrial revolution. Employing 'Glyph magic' - a new kind of magic, deadly to vampires - they have hunted the remaining vampires to near extinction: as a result, several vampires have agreed to serve the Sarafan out of self-preservation. Umah is a member of the Cabal, an underground resistance movement formed of vampires and working to undermine the Sarafan at every turn. The Cabal hopes that Kain will destroy the Sarafan Lord, and the traitorous vampires that protect him.

Kain sets out to get his revenge, reclaim the Soul Reaver sword from the Sarafan Lord, and continue his ascent to power.

=== Story ===
The story is a paradox in Nosgoth's history. Because Raziel's soul was not absorbed into the physical Soul Reaver, an alternate history was introduced into Blood Omen 2. This history places Kain at the threshold of gaining his empire, but because of the weakened state of the Pillars, the Hylden race was able to re-enter Nosgoth. The Hylden masquerade as the defunct Sarafan army to exploit Nosgoth. With their arrival they created an Industrial Age, hunted the Vampire race to near extinction, and domesticated humanity through harsh martial laws and overbearing taxation. Their Glyph magic is used to power Nosgoth's industrial revolution. The surviving vampires serve the Hylden through espionage.

The Cabal, an underground resistance working to topple the Sarafan's plans, are led by Vorador - resurrected in this alternate timeline. They plan to use Kain as the unseen hand that will destroy the Sarafan's operation from the inside. However Kain plans to use this position to reclaim his place as Nosgoth's ruler. Kain was defeated by the Sarafan Lord through the betrayal of his lieutenants. He finds and kills them, absorbing their dark arts.

During reconnaissance of the Sarafan's position one of Vorador's lieutenants, Umah, discovers the location of an amulet called the Nexus Stone. Umah informs Kain that the Nexus Stone is what the Sarafan Lord used to defeat him in their battle. Afterward Vorador tells Kain of a secret weapon, The Device, that will wipe away all life in Nosgoth that is not Hylden. Kain is then told to seek out the Seer, a witch that lives on the outskirts of Meridian.

The Seer explains to Kain that the glyph magic that is supplying Meridian with power is also being used to power The Device. He also drinks her blood to receive telekinesis. As they talk the Sarafan Lord, secretly tracking Kain, sets fire to her house. Sacrificing her safety, the Seer then teleports Kain to the Eternal Prison.

Kain is able to find the Builder, who confesses he built The Device out of arrogance, and wishes to make amends by helping Kain destroy his creation. He tells Kain the Device is powered by a massive life-form called the Mass. The Mass has powerful psychic abilities but is harmless if there is no way to channel the creature's power. Kain is told the Mass is weak against the blood of an Ancient, and the Builder asks Kain to drain him of his blood, and to feed it to the Mass, ensuring its destruction. Kain does so, and faces his last lieutenant (Magnus) before leaving the Eternal Prison.

Kain finds out that Magnus never betrayed him, and only wanted to be his champion. He tried to confront the Sarafan Lord himself, but lost and was then cast into the Eternal Prison, where he lost his mind. Kain destroys the Mass and, leaving the Hylden's lair, meets Janos Audron who has regained his true form. Kain does not know Janos yet, but learns he is the last true ancient vampire.

After Janos explains to Kain part of the history concerning the Hylden, their lord/general and Kain's own involvement in them (unwittingly allowing the Hylden Lord to slip into Nosgoth from the Demon Realm as the pillars were ruined and dimensional barriers weakened), Janos transports Kain and Himself to sanctuary where Vorador and Umah are waiting. Janos explains to the gathered vampires the nature of the Hylden and their plan to invade Nosgoth via a Hylden Gate, located in the ancient Hylden city across the Great Southern Sea from Meridian. However, Janos cannot transport the vampires there immediately as the city is protected by a magical barrier. It is agreed that Kain and Umah are to infiltrate a ship heading to the city from the Wharves and neutralize the barrier when on site.

Umah starts to question Kain's plans for Nosgoth, wondering how his stern rule would be better than that of the Sarafan. She steals the Nexus Stone from Kain and sets off to defeat the Hylden Lord herself. Not long after that, Kain finds Umah mortally wounded; though he has a chance to save her, he refuses, unable to trust her due to the earlier treachery. Kain kills Umah but regrets it, noting that "now you have left me alone". Kain then proceeds to board a vessel heading out to sea.

Kain encounters the Hylden Lord waiting at the docks of the Hylden City. The two exchange words and the Hylden Lord attempts to strike Kain down with the Soul Reaver, but is stopped by the Nexus Stone that protected him from Kain's similar attack 200 years ago. The Hylden Lord teleports away and Kain proceeds to explore the Hylden city. After destroying the generator powering the magical barrier, Vorador and Janos warp in. Vorador asks Kain about Umah, being unable to sense her, and Kain tells him that she is dead and openly declares that he killed her for treason, even though he could have saved her. Vorador is horrified at Kain's ruthlessness and the two seem to be on the verge of fighting, but Janos urges them to put aside their conflict. Just as Kain agrees to settle affairs with Vorador later, the Sarafan Lord ambushes the trio and wounds Vorador and Janos, depriving Kain of their help. Janos teleports Kain nearer to the gate and stays behind to tend to Vorador.

Having finally reached the Hylden Gate Kain finds the Hylden Lord. Kain and the Hylden Lord speak, Kain offers the Hylden Lord a choice of exile or annihilation as he destroys the Hylden Gate, while the Hylden Lord berates Kain for his petty lust for power and dominion over Nosgoth, akin to a petty noble who gained too much power and can never be sated. Kain denounces the Hylden Lord, boasting how all of his spies and traitors have fallen before him, even Umah. Surprised, the Hylden Lord claims that he has no spy named Umah, at which Kain angrily attacks him.

After a brief struggle Kain knocks the Hylden Lord off the platform, but he reappears, gloating how Kain cannot slay him while the Hylden Gate is active. Kain then casts the Nexus Stone into the gate, which begins to implode. Janos arrives at that moment and exchanges hateful words with the Hylden Lord. The Hylden Lord grabs Janos and throws him into the imploding vortex and turns to Kain, who is now in possession of the Soul Reaver.

The Hylden Lord and Kain battle one final time, but armed with the Soul Reaver and with the Nexus Stone gone, Kain easily defeats the Hylden Lord. The Hylden Lord, in his dying breath, assures Kain that the war between Vampires and Hylden will never be over, as the Demon Realm ensures the immortality of the Hylden race. Kain states that should the Hylden ever return, he will be waiting and kills the Hylden Lord.

As the Hylden City is slowly destroyed by the collapsing gate, Kain is seen slowly walking away, pondering his plans for Nosgoth.

== Development ==
Blood Omen 2 was not produced with the involvement of the Soul Reaver crew, instead being created by a new team at Crystal Dynamics under the direction of Glen Schofield. A key point of focus for the developers was the main character, Kain; Crystal Dynamics had "a huge investment in Kain as a character".

== Reception ==
Reception

Aggregate score
Aggregator	Score			
Aggregator	GameCube	PC	PS2	Xbox
Metacritic	71/100	66/100	67/100	76/100

Review scores
Publication	Score			
Publication	GameCube	PC	PS2	Xbox
Computer Games Magazine	N/A	1/5	N/A	N/A
Computer Gaming World	N/A	3.5/5	N/A	N/A
Electronic Gaming Monthly	6.5/10	N/A	7.17/10	8.5/10
Game Informer	7.5/10	N/A	8/10	8.25/10
GamePro	4/5	N/A	4/5	4.5/5
GameRevolution	N/A	N/A	C−	N/A
GameSpot	7.1/10	7.6/10	7.4/10	7.6/10
GameSpy	2/5	74%	68%	N/A
GameZone	7.6/10	7.8/10	7/10	7/10
IGN	7/10	7.1/10	7.4/10	7.7/10
Nintendo Power	3.9/5	N/A	N/A	N/A
Official U.S. PlayStation Magazine	N/A	N/A	3.5/5	N/A
Official Xbox Magazine (US)	N/A	N/A	N/A	8.5/10
PC Gamer (US)	N/A	71%	N/A	N/A

The Xbox version received "generally favorable reviews", while the other console versions received "average" reviews, according to the review aggregation website Metacritic.

AllGame gave the PS2 and Xbox versions three stars out of five, saying of the former, "Even with the ordinary combat and rather tedious puzzles, Blood Omen 2 still manages to be compelling enough to keep you playing to the end, which is a testament to the overall presentation and varied locales"; and of the latter, "Less demanding players will be more tolerant of the game's repetitive nature, while others will yearn for something juicier to sink their teeth into."
