= Ghostbusters II (NES video game) =

1990 video game

- North American box art
- Developer: Imagineering
- Publisher: Activision
- Director: Dan Kitchen
- Producer: Tom Sloper
- Designer: Dan Kitchen
- Programmers: Dan Kitchen; Rob Harris; Tony Chung Lau; Alex De Meo
- Artist: Mike Sullivan
- Composer: Mark Van Hecke
- Platform: Nintendo Entertainment System
- Release: NA: April 1990; UK: March 1991
- Genre: Action
- Mode: Single-player

Ghostbusters II is a 1990 action game for the NES, developed by Imagineering and published by Activision. It is based on the 1989 film of the same name, and was released in the United States in April 1990, followed by a United Kingdom release in March 1991.

In Europe and Japan, HAL Laboratory released its own Ghostbusters II game called New Ghostbusters II.

== Gameplay ==
Ghostbusters II is a side-scrolling action game. It features various levels, including one in which the player, as a Ghostbuster, must avoid giant spiders and ghosts in a sewer. The game also allows the player to drive the Ectomobile, which must avoid obstacles and can shoot at oncoming ghosts. The player can also control the Statue of Liberty. In the final level, the player faces off against Vigo the Carpathian.

== Reception ==
Reception

Review scores
Publication	Score
AllGame	1.5/5
Computer and Video Games	61%
Electronic Gaming Monthly	5/10, 4/10, 3/10, 4/10
Mean Machines	57%
Power Play	45%
VideoGame	3/5

Computer and Video Games wrote that the game has bad graphics and average sound and recommended to avoid it. Reviewers for Electronic Gaming Monthly criticized the gameplay, believing it to be inadequate.

Mean Machines praised the variety and considered the game to be adequately difficult, but criticism was directed at the graphics, sound, and lack of originality. In a later review, Skyler Miller of AllGame criticized the graphics and called the game's difficulty as grueling, but stated that the Ghostbusters theme music was well done.
