= Space Shuttle Project =

1991 video game

- Cover art
- Developer: Imagineering
- Publisher: Absolute Entertainment
- Designer: John Van Ryzin
- Artists: Bill Wentworth; John Van Ryzin
- Composer: Scott Marshall
- Platform: NES
- Release: NA: November 1991
- Genre: Action
- Mode: Single-player

Space Shuttle Project is an action video game released in 1991 by Absolute Entertainment for the Nintendo Entertainment System. It was one of the few vehicle simulators not to be released for the personal computer.

== Gameplay ==
The second mission of this video game requires players to build a space station.

The object of Space Shuttle Project is to successfully launch and fly one of NASA's historic Space Shuttles as a shuttle commander. Gameplay is composed of several different types of missions, each broken up into short mini-games.

Players are first required to activate oxygen and hydrogen pumps in addition to getting additional crew members into the shuttle within a strict time limit. Crew members are transported to certain parts of the ship by moving an elevator up and down while avoiding moving bumpers. Then, the player must successfully launch the shuttle into space by performing quick time events that correspond to particular shuttle launch maneuvers such as booster rocket separation. Once in space, one of several missions will be played where the player must control the astronaut by maneuvering him/her around hazards, replenish his air supply before the timer runs out, and deliver components for the Space Station Freedom to their correct locations. A cosmonaut from the Soviet Union must also be rescued in the game.

Players that fail to maintain a flawlessly working space shuttle will see the entire shuttle mission fail. Every mission has a lengthy list of secondary objectives that require speed, patience in addition to pure trial and error.

A complete shuttle guidance system is included in the game's instruction manual. Finally, the player must land the shuttle by again performing Quick Time Events that correspond to landing maneuvers before finally landing at Edwards Air Force Base. Players get a congratulations screen featuring then-US president George H. W. Bush after finishing all six missions.

== Reception ==
Allgame gave Space Shuttle Project a score of 2.5 points out of a possible 5.
