= LoadingReadyRun =

Canadian entertainment group

- Website type: Comedy
- Headquarters: Victoria, BC
- Creators: Graham Stark, Paul Saunders
- Website: www.loadingreadyrun.com
- Launched: 13 October 2003

Twitch information
- Channel: LoadingReadyRun
- Years active: 2011–present
- Genre: Gaming
- Followers: 109 thousand

YouTube information
- Channel: LoadingReadyRun
- Years active: 2006–present
- Genre: Comedy
- Subscribers: 153 thousand
- Views: 137 million
- Last updated: 7 April 2024

LoadingReadyRun, often abbreviated to LRR, is a Canadian entertainment group that produces video and audio comedy. It often covers video games, internet trends, and popular culture.

Founded in October 2003 by Graham Stark and Paul Saunders and based in Victoria, British Columbia, the group's output has included sketch comedy, video game streams, panel shows, game shows, podcasts, and reality TV shows. LoadingReadyRun have also run the fundraiser Desert Bus For Hope since 2007. LoadingReadyRun produces videos and podcasts independently, and has also worked under contract with other companies, under the legal name Bionic Trousers Media.

== History ==
LoadingReadyRun was founded by Graham Stark and Paul Saunders in October 2003. It began producing a weekly sketch video which it uploaded onto its own website. LRR never missed that weekly deadline, even while traveling. LRR's name and graphic design for its title cards, credits and website was based on the Commodore 64.

In 2007, LoadingReadyRun broadcast Desert Bus For Hope, a fundraiser to raise money for the charity Child's Play. LRR have repeated this event every year since.

In December 2008 Graham and Paul tied for first place in The Escapist's Second Annual Film Festival with Unskippable, a Mystery Science Theater 3000 style take of the introduction cinematic to the video game Lost Planet. For winning the contest they were rewarded with a contract to produce a weekly video for The Escapist. Unskippable was LRR's second series after the sketches, and would be followed by further series produced for The Escapist including Escapist News Network, Feed Dump, and Daily Drop. The sketches were also hosted on The Escapist during this time.

Some of LRR's videos have been featured in film festivals such as the Comic-Con International Independent Film Festival in San Diego, and shown on major television networks, including G4 Canada and CNN.

In 2013, LoadingReadyRun announced that the sketches were becoming too labor- and time-intensive to produce on a weekly basis without impacting other projects. It ran a Kickstarter campaign to fund one final year before retiring the videos in 2015. The Kickstarter also provided funding to start live streaming.

On 25 March 2015, Stark announced on their blog that they would be leaving The Escapist and subsequently ending Unskippable. Unskippable could not be continued as The Escapist owned the property. Feed Dump was continued by LoadingReadyRun independently. On 13 July 2022, LoadingReadyRun announced the acquiring of Unskippable from The Escapist and started republishing it under their own brand on the channel LoadingReadyRun Video Games, with new episodes to come after the archive is uploaded.

LoadingReadyRun has produced paid video content for other companies. LRR produces Friday Nights, a scripted comedy about Magic: The Gathering. It was produced under contract from Wizards of the Coast from 2012 through 2019, but is now produced in-house by LRR. LRR also produced content for Penny Arcade's PATV, including the reality TV show Strip Search, and made Tabletop Deathmatch for Cards Against Humanity. LRR has also produced Fairway Solitaire commercials for Big Fish Games and Pocket Planes commercials for NimbleBit. Today, LRR's income comes primarily from direct donations, which it receives from viewers through Patreon, Twitch, and YouTube. A number of its members work full-time for LoadingReadyRun, and they have said that they plan to bring more of their contract workers on full-time as funding and interest increase.

On 28 June 2022, Graham Stark announced that he was suffering from an aggressive form of lymphoma, for which he was receiving chemotherapy. It was announced on November 14 during Desert Bus 2022 that he was in full remission, with no expectation of recurrence.

== Members ==
The main crew of LoadingReadyRun consists of members who have regular shows on their Twitch channel, and/or are frequently involved with production. Some former crew members will still occasionally appear in videos, streams, or podcasts.

Main crew

- Graham Stark (Founder)
- Paul Saunders (Founder)
- Kathleen De Vere
- James Turner
- Alex Steacy
- Cameron Lauder
- Brendan "Beej" Dery
- Heather Dery
- Ian Horner
- Coriander "Cori" Dickinson
- Adam Savidan
- Ben "Bengineering" Ulmer
- Matt Griffiths
- Benjamin Wheeler
- Serge Yager
- Nelson Salahub
- Jordynne Hatton

Former crew

- Natalia "Tally" Petter (née Heilke)
- Tim Sevenhuysen
- Morgan vanHumbeck
- Bill Watt (Died 19 January 2016)
- Ben Wilkinson
- Jeremy "Jer" Petter

Supporting contributors and frequent guests

- Matt Wiggins
- Wes Borg
- Andrew Cownden
- Brad Kirkland
- Johnny_Lunchbox
- Nathan Mosher
- Kate Stark
- Raymond Steacy
- Molly Lewis
- Ash Vickers
- Missie Peters
- Bradley Rains
- Devin "Featherweight" Harrigan
- Chris "Fugiman" Gamble
- RebelliousUno
- Jacob Burgess
- Ashley Turner (née Allman)
- Jeremy White
- Liam Coughlan
- Taylor Quinn
- Dale Friesen
- Elisa "LeeLee" Scaldaferri
- MangledPixel
- Johnny Blakeborough
- Ben Soileau
- Lissette Arevalo

== Work ==
=== Scripted comedy ===
LoadingReadyRun began as a series of short one- to two-minute short films, posted to the LRR website each week. The sketch series ran from 2003 to 2015. Sketches with notable success included:

How to Talk like a Pirate
Part of a fictional 1970s-style language-learning series, this video teaches the nuances of pirate speech. It was released for International Talk Like a Pirate Day, 2006. Subsequent Talk Like a Pirate Days have led to the video being recirculated once a year.
Three PS3s
Posted around the release of the comparatively scarce and expensive PlayStation 3, this video features Paul brazenly claiming to own "three PS3s". The video spread quickly when it was posted to YouTube, with viewers (many of whom didn't recognize the intended ironic tone) posting death threats and incensed comments as well as video parody responses. In truth, the entire crew owned zero PS3s; they borrowed two of them and the third was a hollow display model. With the launch of the PlayStation 4 in 2013, Paul recorded another video, in which he now claims to have four PlayStation 4 consoles, and did so again in 2020 with the launch of the PlayStation 5, claiming to own five PlayStation 5 consoles. :
Halo: The Future of Gaming
In preparation for the release of Halo 3, LoadingReadyRun produced Halo: The Future of Gaming, providing a "look back" at the impact of the Halo video game series, and extrapolating into the future. The video was one of LoadingReadyRun's most popular videos for several years.

In 2013, LoadingReadyRun announced that the Weekly Videos were becoming too labor- and time-intensive to produce on a weekly basis without impacting other projects, and began a Kickstarter campaign to fund one final year before retiring the videos in 2015. Instead of the weekly comedy sketches, LRR produces shorter sketch videos called Crapshots as well as Magic: The Gathering-themed short sketches called Sick Rips.

LRR also produces commodoreHUSTLE, a plotted series dramatizing the personal lives of the crew, officially described as "A web series about the creators of a web series". The crew play exaggerated versions of themselves – Paul Saunders is often portrayed as a technical genius without common sense, Graham Stark is abusive to his roommate Matt Wiggins, and Morgan VanHumbeck is an egotistical buffoon – and a running theme in the series is the group's dysfunctional nature and infighting. commodoreHUSTLE is now produced as part of LRR's Loading Ready Live shows.

LRR was commissioned by Wizards of the Coast to produce a four-episode commodoreHUSTLE spin-off miniseries called Friday Nights, detailing the crew's growing obsession with Magic: The Gathering. The series then became an ongoing commission to produce Friday Nights about once a month for the Wizards of the Coast YouTube channel.

LRR also produces Qwerpline, a podcast that parodies a typical 'morning radio' show, recorded by Graham, Alex, Beej, Ian, and Kathleen. Set in the fictional town of Nsburg, Qwerpline is mostly improvised and then edited; similar in concept to shows such as Reno 911, each episode is written with only a rough outline, recorded live and then edited for broadcast. Each episode opens and closes with a promotional spot for that week's 'Qwerpline sponsor', which is conceived and performed by Beej.

=== Streaming and live shows ===
LoadingReadyRun streams mainly Let's Play-style shows on Twitch, where hosts play through a video game and comment on it. Other streams have included playing through board games or running role-playing games, or streams of crafts and construction.

LRR's streaming includes LoadingReadyLIVE, a monthly live variety show. Described initially as a hybrid comedy/talent/panel show, LoadingReadyLIVE's structure has varied but can include short game-show segments, prerecorded events filmed on the day of broadcast, highlights from other streamed shows, an "AskLRR" viewer-mail panel, and an episode of commodoreHUSTLE. LoadingReadyLIVE's tagline is 'This is/it's live, so something's gonna happen!'.

LoadingReadyRun is contracted by Wizards of the Coast to run Magic Pre-PreReleases (PPRs), day-long streams where members of LRR along with special guests play the latest set before it is released publicly.

=== Panel shows and news shows ===
LoadingReadyRun have had a variety of shows riffing on news. The Whatever Thing was followed by Phailhaüs, then by Feed Dump, each featuring jokes about comical news stories.

LoadingReadyRun have also had multiple shows riffing specifically on video game news. Escapist News Network was created specifically for The Escapist. When LRR left The Escapist, it created a similar show called CheckPoint which it produced for Penny Arcade TV. In December 2013, Penny Arcade announced that due to some restructuring they would no longer host 3rd party content on their PATV site. LRR later began to produce CheckPoint independently, streaming CheckPoint Plus, a live stream of CheckPoint and its creation.

In 2018 LRR began The Panalysts, a panel show where panelists are presented with hypothetical situations and reason how to get the best out of them. For the first season, the show was primarily hosted by Kathleen De Vere. Since the second season premiered in May 2019 the show has been hosted by Molly Lewis.

LRR produced Strip Search for PATV. Strip Search was a reality TV show where cartoonists competed for an internship at Penny Arcade. It ran for one season. Similarly, LoadingReadyRun produced Tabletop Deathmatch, a show hosted by Cards Against Humanity whose goal was to find exceptional unpublished boardgames who could win funding for a first printing. Two seasons were produced.

=== Podcasts ===
LoadingReadyRun have a number of current and completed podcasts. These include podcasts on Magic: the Gathering (Tap Tap Concede, North 100), reviews of media (SideWalk Slam, AnoAni, Countdown to Infinity, Magnum Rewatch, Fight the Future, From Rewatch with Love), plays of role-playing games (Temple of the Lava Bears, Dice Friends) and talking about the video creation process (LRRCast) among others. Some videos are also released as podcasts, such as Qwerpline.

=== Miscellaneous ===
Unskippable was LoadingReadyRun's second series other than its original sketch series, and its first work produced under contract for another website. Unskippable played opening cutscenes to video games and mocked them in the style of Mystery Science Theater 3000. In December 2008 Graham and Paul tied for first place in The Escapist's Second Annual Film with a pilot episode of Unskippable, mocking the game Lost Planet. For winning the contest they were rewarded with a contract to produce a weekly video for The Escapist. The series aired every Monday and satirized cinematics to games like Eternal Sonata, Dirge of Cerberus: Final Fantasy VII and The Darkness. It received heavy promotion on the site, including crossovers with Zero Punctuation where Ben "Yahtzee" Croshaw joined the Star Ocean: The Last Hope episode and Graham produced a ZP-style review of X-Blades, which soon switched over to Yahtzee's review of Halo Wars. They also broadcast a one-off live special of Unskippable on The Escapist where they did a "Let's Play" of Legaia 2 in the humorous and critical style of the show. The two also appeared in episode 21 of Arcade as themselves. On 25 March 2015, Stark announced on their blog that they would be leaving The Escapist and subsequently ending Unskippable. Unskippable, with a tenure of six years, could not be continued as The Escapist owns 'Unskippable' property. Their second show on The Escapist, Feed Dump, continued on LoadingReadyRun's own YouTube channel.

LoadingReadyRun's Loading Time series documents the creative and production processes undergone by LoadingReadyRun. In the past, these Loading Time videos would feature behind the scenes footage for the creation of a specific sketch. After the launch of its Patreon in 2014, Loading Time videos shifted focus from specific sketches or types of content to a summarization of the work the team does on a monthly basis.

Iron Stomach Challenge was a cooking show in which the crew would blend together random ingredients (usually suggested by their viewers), and attempt to eat or drink the usually-putrid concoction. Viewer suggestions were governed by several rules: it had to be safe to eat (i.e., it couldn't be poisonous or otherwise inedible), it had to be a genuine food item (i.e., not something that is safe to eat but otherwise not considered 'food'), and it had to be relatively easy to obtain in a typical North American city. LoadingReadyLIVE has also featured eating challenges.

Daily Drop was a feature on The Escapist, made by LoadingReadyRun. It was filmed in the basement of the Victoria Event Centre. It consists of approximately 2-minute-long clips of objects falling in, as recorded by a high-speed camera, and impacting the test area floor. A new installment was released every weekday between 7 October 2010 and 25 May 2011.

In addition to their frequent collaborations with Wizards of the Coast on set releases and video content, on 29 November 2021 Magic: the Gathering head designer Mark Rosewater announced that Graham, Kathleen, and Cameron had been hired as part of the "creative text team" for the upcoming Unfinity set. On 29 September 2022, Kathleen revealed that she had also been hired to work on the creative text team for the 2022 Magic: the Gathering set, "The Brothers' War."

== Desert Bus for Hope ==
LoadingReadyRun is perhaps best known for its annual Desert Bus For Hope fundraiser. On 23 November 2007, the group started a marathon game session of Desert Bus (a minigame from Penn & Teller's Smoke and Mirrors) called Desert Bus for Hope to raise money for the charity Child's Play. The four-man team took turns playing the game continuously, with more hours added as more donations were made. The event was broadcast live via webcam, and garnered attention both from the media, and Penn & Teller, who called in, sent pizza, and made donations. By the end of the event, $22,805 had been raised, including donations from Penn and Teller themselves.

On 18 November 2008, LoadingReadyRun officially announced that it planned a second marathon run of Desert Bus which began on 28 November. The second Desert Bus lasted slightly more than five days and raised over $70,000. The crew later produced a music video entitled "Desert Bus Killed the Internet Star" (a parody of "Video Killed the Radio Star") describing the events of the marathon.

On 25 August 2009, the third marathon run was announced, set to start on 20 November 2009. At 18:42 GMT-0 on 26 November 2009 the marathon completed, raising over $140,000 (after all e-cheques had cleared) for Child's Play. One notable donor, going by the alias "Octopimp", donated nearly $10,000 alone across several of that year's auctions, which he referred to as 'Christmas shopping'. This made him a mascot of sorts in the event's live chatroom and in turn inspired many other high-number donations and auction bids.

The fourth marathon run was announced on 4 May 2010, and began on 19 November 2010 at 6:00 p.m. PST. Penn & Teller auctioned off an "Ultimate Desert Bus Experience Pack" which included a bus ticket and sand from the Las Vegas desert, signed by Penn & Teller themselves. The fourth run concluded after 5 days and 21 hours, with $209,482 raised.

Desert Bus 6 began Friday, 16 November 2012, and breached one million US dollars in lifetime donations on 19 November at 6:46pm Lifetime donations subsequently passed $5 million in 2018, and $10 million in 2023. Additionally, 2020 was the first individual year surpassing one million dollars in donations after including all money raised through merchandise, and 2021 was the first year surpassing one million dollars in donations logged during the event alone. The tenth year of Desert Bus was the subject of a documentary called "We Are Desert Bus", released in 2019.

Desert Bus for Hope 2020, the 14th year of the event, was held remotely across multiple locations due to the COVID-19 pandemic, and is notable as the first year to, due to this restriction, not use actual Sega CD or JVC X'Eye hardware. Instead the event utilized a cloud-hosted emulator that could be passed between hosts using a web browser, a system they used again in 2021 and 2022. In 2021, Desert Bus was held in a 'hybrid' format, where half the event was in-person and half was held remotely. The event mostly returned to an in-person format for 2022, with the exception of the 12AM – 6AM 'Zeta shift', as well as all guests and some of the behind-the-scenes crew, before returning fully to an in-person format and original hardware in 2023. In 2024, the event transitioned away from original hardware to the MiSTER Pi, an at the time new-to-market low-cost variant of the open source FPGA-based MiSTer project, due to ongoing reliability and availability concerns.

Desert Bus for Hope 2024 was the first year to raise enough money to last for 168 hours, a full seven 24-hour days, after viewers rallied to raise the remaining approximately $120,000 needed to reach this goal within an hour and a half, making the milestone within 15 minutes of the deadline.

After having been teased during Desert Bus 2024, it was announced in April 2025 that Desert Bus would be running a smaller, 'satellite' event in the following month called 'Desert Bus Express'; it would last only 24 hours and benefit BC Cancer Foundation. The event was run remotely, using the systems developed for Desert Bus 2020. Rather than donations extending the length of the event, the first $100,000 of donations were matched by an anonymous donor.

Desert Bus for Hope
Year	Name	Raised (USD)	Lifetime (USD)
2007	Desert Bus for Hope	$22,805.00	$22,805.00
2008	Desert Bus for Hope 2: Bus Harder	$70,423.79	$93,228.79
2009	Desert Bus 3: Desert Bus VI in Japan	$140,449.68	$233,678.47
2010	Desert Bus for Hope 4: A New Hope	$209,482.00	$443,160.47
2011	Desert Bus for Hope 5: De5ert Bus	$383,125.10	$826,285.57
2012	Desert Bus for Hope 6: Desert Bus 3 in America	$443,630.00	$1,269,915.57
2013	Desert Bus for Hope 007	$523,520.00	$1,793,435.57
2014	Desert Bus for Hope 8	$643,242.58	$2,436,678.15
2015	Desert Bus for Hope 9: The Joy of Bussing	$683,720.00	$3,120,398.15
2016	Desert Bus X	$695,242.58	$3,815,640.72
2017	Desert Bus for Hope 2017	$655,402.56	$4,471,043.28
2018	Desert Bus for Hope 2018	$730,099.90	$5,201,143.18
2019	Desert Bus 2019: Untitled Bus Fundraiser	$865,015.00	$6,066,158.18
2020	Desert Bus for Hope 2020	$1,052,902.40	$7,119,060.58
2021	Desert Bus for Hope 2021	$1,223,108.83	$8,342,169.41
2022	Desert Bus for Hope 2022	$1,138,674.80	$9,480,844.21
2023	Desert Bus for Hope 2023	$1,193,560.00	$10,674,404.21
2024	Desert Bus for Hope 2024	$1,252,690.69	$11,927,094.90
2025	Desert Bus for Hope 2025	$1,052,000.01	$12,980,824.20
2026	Desert Bus for Hope 2026	$1,347,625.31	$14,336,003.39
Running total			$12,980,824.20

Desert Bus Express
Date	Name	Raised (CAD)	Lifetime (CAD)
May 2025	Desert Bus Express	$205,031.90	$205,031.90
Running total			$205,031.90

== Selected awards ==
Video	Organisation	Award
The Pair	Vancouver Island Short Film Festival 2015	People's choice
The Secret of the Sauce	Vancouver Island Short Film Festival 2010	Best writing
Right to the Source	Vancouver Island Short Film Festival 2009	Best writing
Eyewitness Accounts	Vancouver Island Short Film Festival 2008	Best writing
How to Talk Like a Pirate	Vancouver Island Short Film Festival 2007	Best writing
Suspend Your Disbelief	Vancouver Island Short Film Festival 2006	Audience Choice; Best Male Performance (Andrew Cownden)
Suspend Your Disbelief	University of Victoria Student Film 2005	Audience Choice
30 Minutes or Less	Vancouver Island Short Film Festival 2006	Best writing
