= Slay the Princess =

2023 video game

- Developer: Black Tabby Games
- Publishers: Black Tabby Games; Serenity Forge (Note: Console versions only)
- Designer: Tony Howard-Arias
- Artist: Abby Howard
- Writer: Tony Howard-Arias
- Composer: Brandon Boone
- Engine: Ren'Py
- Platforms: Linux; macOS; Nintendo Switch; PlayStation 4; PlayStation 5; Windows; Xbox One; Xbox Series X/S
- Release: October 23, 2023: Linux, macOS, Windows; October 23, 2023; Nintendo Switch, PlayStation 4, PlayStation 5, Xbox One, Xbox Series X/S; October 24, 2024
- Genres: Psychological horror, visual novel
- Mode: Single-player

Slay the Princess is a 2023 horror adventure game developed and published by Black Tabby Games for Microsoft Windows, Linux, and macOS systems. It was released on October 23, 2023. The game is conceptually a twist on the damsel-in-distress archetype; rather than saving the princess, the objective is to kill her.

An expanded version, subtitled The Pristine Cut, was released on October 24, 2024 for consoles, alongside a free update for existing versions of the game. The console ports are published by Serenity Forge.

Slay the Princess received critical acclaim for its narrative, art, music, and voice performances.

== Gameplay ==
Slay the Princess is a visual novel, wherein the player advances through hand-drawn scenes from the player character's perspective. The player's primary interaction with the game is selecting dialogue or action options. How the story unfolds depends on the player's choices and dialogue responses. It features a branching and looping narrative structure. Each loop is generally centered on the player's choice to save or slay the titular princess, and the actions they take towards that goal.

The initial loop, or chapter, of each narrative branch is always the same, and the choices made by the player affect the narrative and visual design of the next loop and the princess's appearance and character, generally along the lines of eldritch or body horror. The player can once again attempt to slay or save the princess in the successive loops. Narrative branches may have two or more loops before they conclude. A narrator and other unseen, named voices comment on and attempt to influence the player's choices. The initial loop features only the narrator and the Voice of the Hero, with different voices added in subsequent loops depending on the narrative branch. Five branches can be completed in a single playthrough, with the game resetting to the initial loop in between them, but the player is restricted from repeating a narrative branch within a single playthrough.

== Plot ==
Gameplay screenshot.

An unnamed hero appears in a forest and is instructed by an off-screen narrator (Jonathan Sims) to slay the princess imprisoned within the basement of the cabin in the forest, who he claims will end the world if she escapes. From there, the Hero can make several decisions, including following the instructions, attempting to save the Princess (Nichole Goodnight), or even refusing to enter the cabin altogether. If the Hero successfully slays the Princess as directed, he leaves the basement to discover the outside world has vanished, which the Narrator claims is his reward. If the Hero refuses to commit suicide, he spends eternity alone in the cabin and the game ends. Any deviation from this course of action inevitably results in his death, and simultaneously if the hero follows directions he still inevitably dies.

After dying, the Hero awakens back in the woods in a parallel world, and is once more ordered to slay the Princess. The Hero and the Princess share a continued existence from the past universe and remember their previous interactions, while the Princess's appearance and demeanor have shifted depending on the last encounter. The new universe's Narrator is dismayed but unsurprised to learn of the Hero's previous death. After further actions from the Hero, the world devolves into an empty void called the Long Quiet (the same void seen in the "Good Ending") and the Princess's current form is absorbed by an amalgam entity later identified as the Shifting Mound. The Shifting Mound explains that the Hero is the only being in the world that she knows, but other worlds exist that she hopes to escape to. She instructs the Hero to bring her more "Princess" forms for her to absorb, so that she may gain new perspectives and become whole.

The Shifting Mound erases the Hero's memory and sends him back to the beginning of the loops. Despite having no knowledge of previous loops, he is unable to repeat his actions in past iterations exactly, resulting in varied Princess forms after each reset, which he can alternatively help or harm. Every "second" world contains a mirror in the cabin that the Narrator denies knowledge of, which disappears when the Hero attempts to touch it. Additionally, the Hero is accompanied by various internal Voices separate from the Narrator who each provide conflicting advice. The Hero returns to the Long Quiet and the Shifting Mound multiple times, each time briefly regaining his memories.

After the Hero has brought the Shifting Mound several Princess forms, he encounters the mirror again and finally sees the Narrator's true form of a bird-like humanoid before the mirror shatters. The Narrator identifies himself as an "Echo" of the being that created the protagonist and reveals the Hero to be the Long Quiet itself and a nascent god. The Narrator explains that he was once a death-fearing mortal who created the Hero, the Princess, and the multiverse-spanning construct they currently reside in by splitting a cosmic entity in two. The Princess is the Shifting Mound, a cosmic entity that embodies continual change, destruction, and rebirth and is based on others' perceptions of her. Killing her would prevent the death of the universe and allow its inhabitants to live forever, but also prevent new life and growth. The Narrator pleads with the Long Quiet to slay the Princess and dies as the last shard of the mirror shatters.

The Shifting Mound, now awakened as a goddess, appears and declares her intentions to let the universe die and create a new one in its place. She invites the Long Quiet to eternally reign over each universe alongside her as a god. However, she can still be defeated by finding and attacking her "heart", manifested as the mortal Princess in the cabin basement.

The game has multiple endings depending on the player's choices. These endings include the Long Quiet accepting the end of the universe and watching the birth of a new one alongside the Shifting Mound, killing the Princess permanently to preserve the current universe, the Hero and the Princess agreeing to forget everything and reset the construct to remain in the loop indefinitely, or the two mutually rejecting godhood and leaving the cabin to face an uncertain future together. In most endings, the Hero and the Princess affirm their mutual love.

== Development ==
Slay the Princess was developed by Black Tabby Games, a Canadian indie studio consisting of husband and wife Tony Howard-Arias and Abby Howard. The studio's only previous game was Scarlet Hollow, an episodic horror game released in early access beginning in 2020. Development of Slay the Princess began in May 2022. At the time, they felt that Scarlet Hollow was not financially successful enough to support the studio on its own through a projected five-year development timeline, and wanted to pursue a second game with fewer assets and shorter development timeline. The pair were first inspired by a game jam entry, Claim Your FREE BitBuddy™ Today!, which impressed Howard-Arias with how much "emotional storytelling" was put into a small game. The pair began discussing a concept of a horror story confined to a few locations and a single character on screen at a time.

A major inspiration for the concept of Slay the Princess was a scene from episode three of Scarlet Hollow with nine different characters having a complex interaction, which led to the idea of one character being multiple different characters at different times. The initial concept was of the player character being ordered to kill a seemingly innocent person who is allegedly dangerous to leave alive and changes shape to be whatever the viewer expects them to be. Howard then suggested "Save the Princess" as a name, and upon finding that "Slay the Princess" was unused as a title the name was taken as a central concept.

The couple rapidly iterated on the concept, with the game announced along with an initial demo in July 2022. In the two weeks following the announcement, the title garnered 25,000 wishlists on its Steam page. All of the artwork for the demo was made in a week. The pair worked on the game during gaps in the production of episodes of Scarlet Hollow over the next fifteen months, with full-time work beginning in February 2023. They estimate that Howard worked the equivalent of three months on the game over the time period, while Howard-Arias worked seven to nine months.

Howard's pencil drawing art style was initially chosen to save time over the more elaborate artwork of Scarlet Hollow, but was kept as they felt it fit the "dreamy, ever-shifting aesthetic" of the game. The voices in the player character's head were inspired by Disco Elysium as a way to steer how the player felt about the princess or situation, so that changes in the next loop would align with those feelings. Voice acting is provided by Jonathan Sims and Nichole Goodnight. The developers wanted to add voice acting to all of the dialogue in the game as the size of the script in Scarlet Hollow had been prohibitive. Goodnight was chosen for the Princess based on a charity stream she had done in which she played Scarlet Hollow, where she voiced all the characters' lines, while Sims was chosen for the Narrator and internal voices as they were fans of his work in The Magnus Archives.

The initial demo, released in 2022, had six variations of the Princess, which was expanded to ten in a second demo to better encapsulate the varying possible choices; for example, the same princess version was reached by trying to save her whether or not the player brought the dagger with them, even though it changed the tone of the dialogue. A second demo was released in March 2023 for the PAX East convention, where several media outlets named it among the best of the event. PAX East included Slay the Princess among the ten finalists of their Rising Showcase.

On September 6, Black Tabby Games participated in Feardemic's Fear Fest, debuting a new trailer announcing a release date of October 20, 2023. However, due to last-minute issues regarding the game's Steam certification it was delayed a few days. The game was released for Windows, macOS, and Linux on October 23, 2023.

On December 16, 2023, Black Tabby Games announced that an expanded version of the game, named The Pristine Cut, would be released in 2024. The expansion was planned to add new chapters to the game, expand some existing chapters, as well as other, unspecified additions. The patch would be made available free of charge, and the price of the full game would not change. An intermediate version, The End of Everything, was released on March 25, including the small changes to the ending and updates to the music to use a live orchestra in the tracks. It was intended to alleviate concerns from potential players about waiting for The Pristine Cut in order to see the final version of the ending. More details about The Pristine Cut were revealed in the Future of Play show as part of Summer Games Fest 2024, including the news that it would be arriving Fall 2024 and would be localized in ten other languages. Additionally, console ports were announced for the same release window, including limited run standard and collectors physical editions for Nintendo Switch and PlayStation 5. The console ports are published by Serenity Forge. The update was released on October 24, 2024.

== Reception ==
Reception

Aggregate scores
| Aggregator | Score |
|---|---|
| Metacritic | 90/100 |
| OpenCritic | 96% |

Review scores
| Publication | Score |
|---|---|
| Destructoid | 9/10 |
| Edge | 8/10 |
| GameSpot | 9/10 (Note: Reviewing The Pristine Cut) |
| Nintendo Life | 7/10 |
| RPGFan | 88% |
| The Games Machine (Italy) | 9.2/10 |
| Bloody Disgusting | 4/5 |
| GamingTrend | 95/100 |
| Multiplayer.it | 9/10 |
| PC Invasion | 9.5/10 |
| The Outerhaven Productions | 4/5 |

Slay the Princess received "universal acclaim", according to review aggregator Metacritic. 96% of critics recommend the game on OpenCritic.

Writing for Polygon, Cass Marshall praised the branching narrative and described the game as a "Halloween treat".

Sims and Goodnight both received widespread praise for their vocal performances. Aaron Boehm of Bloody Disgusting wrote that, "There are times that just the change in tone of Goodnight's voice sent a chill up my spine as the mood of a scene shifted towards the macabre."

On PC Gamer, the game was praised for the visual gameplay style, saying how it was "2023's most fascinating horror game".

Destructoid further stated how the handdrawn art style was of particuar mention, along with the brilliant voice acting

=== Sales ===
On November 30, 2023, Black Tabby Games announced that Slay the Princess had sold 100,000 units. By March 2024, the game had sold 200,000 units, and by November 2024 over 500,000 copies. In February 2026 it was announced the game had crossed 1,000,000 copies sold over all platforms.

=== Awards ===
Slay the Princess was included on lists of the best games of 2023 compiled by Kotaku, Inverse, TheGamer, GameSpot, and Destructoid.

Awards and nominations
| Year | Ceremony | Category | Result | Ref. |
|---|---|---|---|---|
| 2023 | IndieCade 2023 | Narrative Spotlight | Nominated | |
| 2023 | OTK Video Game Awards | Best Narrative | Nominated | |
| 2023 | OTK Video Game Awards | Best Indie RPG | Won | |
| 2023 | The Horror Game Awards | Best Performance (Jonathan Sims) | Nominated | |
| 2023 | The Horror Game Awards | Best Narrative | Nominated | |
| 2023 | The Horror Game Awards | Best Indie Horror | Nominated | |
| 2023 | The Horror Game Awards | Players' Choice | Won | |
| 2024 | New York Game Awards | Chumley's Speakeasy Award for Best Hidden Gem | Won | |
| 2024 | Independent Games Festival | Excellence in Narrative | Honorable mention | |
| 2024 | World Soundtrack Awards | WSA Game Music Award | Won | |
| 2024 | Indie Live Expo | Best New Characters Award | Won | |
| 2024 | Indie Live Expo | Grand Prize | Won | |
| 2025 | Nebula Awards | Best Game Writing | Nominated | |
