= Strip Search (web series) =

2013 American reality TV series

- Genre: Reality TV
- Created by: Penny Arcade
- Directed by: Graham Stark
- Presented by: Graham Stark
- Starring: see contestants below
- Composer: Bradley Rains
- Country of origin: United States
- Original language: English
- No. of seasons: 1
- No. of episodes: 31

Production
- Executive producers: Jerry Holkins; Mike Krahulik; Robert Khoo
- Producers: Graham Stark; Kathleen De Vere; Paul Saunders; James Turner
- Production location: Seattle, Washington
- Cinematography: Jason Chinnock
- Editors: Graham Stark; Kathleen De Vere (asst.)
- Production company: Bionic Trousers Media

Original release
- Release: March 1 – June 18, 2013

Strip Search is a 2013 online reality television game show created by Penny Arcade and produced by Bionic Trousers Media (also known as LoadingReadyRun). The show featured twelve artists who competed over thirty-one episodes, with the series' winner receiving a cash prize and integration into the Penny Arcade offices in Seattle for one year.

The show was created as a stretch goal in Penny Arcade's 2012 Kickstarter campaign to remove ads from their website. The show was won by artist Katie Rice, who went on to produce the webcomic Camp Weedonwantcha.

== Creation ==
In 2012, Penny Arcade launched a Kickstarter campaign with the primary goal of removing ads from their website for a year. The primary goal required $250,000, but there were also stretch goals, including "a sort of 'America's next top webcomic' show" if the campaign reached $450,000. The campaign exceeded this goal and Penny Arcade committed to producing the show, later named Strip Search. Penny Arcade commissioned Bionic Trousers Media, the legal entity behind sketch comedy group LoadingReadyRun, to film, host, and edit the show. The show cost around $250,000 to produce, and was released in 2013.

In interviews, Penny Arcade said that they received over 1,000 applicants, and used a brutal process to cut down to 12 contestants, including assessing whether they felt they would be able to work with the person for a year, and if they would be funny. Krahulik said of filming that "Jerry [Holkins] was bad cop, and I was the asshole,” and prided himself on how many times he made people cry. Holkins said they had to try hard to create drama, especially in a house filled with aspiring artists who all seemed to get along and understand one another; Krahulik said he look at contestants and think, “what’s the meanest thing that I can say.”

While Penny Arcade referred to the series as "Season One", and left filming of that season confident there would be a second season, only one season was ever produced.

== Format ==
Strip Search featured twelve cartoonists, living together for the length of the show, competing for a grand prize of $15,000 and a year working in Penny Arcade's offices, including its production resources. The show used progressive elimination to narrow down the initial group of twelve artists to a final winner. While living in a large pineapple-themed house, the artists were given challenges each episode ranging from creative to legal to physical, with the winner or winners of each receiving a prize.

The winner of the last challenge each day had to choose two of the artists to go head-to-head and compete to stay in the game. Elimination candidates met the Penny Arcade creators, Mike Krahulik and Jerry Holkins, and after selecting two random concepts then created an original comic strip based on fusing the concepts. The winner goes back to the house to continue competing while the loser is eliminated. Several episodes deviated from this format at Krahulik and Holkins' decision, such as eliminating multiple people and returning previously eliminated contestants.

== Contestants ==
Contestant	Comic / work	Occupation / background
Abby Howard; 20, Montreal, Quebec	Junior Scientist Power Hour	Webcomic artist
Alex Hobbs; 22, Tempe, Arizona	Wanderlust Kid	Webcomic artist
Erika Moen; 29, Portland, Oregon	Oh Joy Sex Toy	Freelance cartoonist
Katie Rice; 31, Burbank, California	Skadi, Camp Weedonwantcha	Webcomic artist
Lexxy Douglass; 27, Carmel, Indiana	The Cloud Factory	Freelance illustrator
Mackenzie Schubert; 26, Portland, Oregon		Webcomic artist
Maki Naro; 31, Brooklyn, New York	Sci-ənce	Webcomic artist
Monica Ray; 22, Northbrook, Illinois	Phuzzy Comics	Webcomic artist
Nick Trujillo; 30, Walnut Creek, California	Mynt Condition Comics	Webcomic artist
Tavis Maiden; 31, Mesa, Arizona	Thunder Skull Press	Artist
Trystan Falcone; 24, Noank, Connecticut	Clique Refresh	Webcomic artist
Ty Halley; 25, Portsmouth, Ohio	The Secret Life of a Journal Comic	Webcomic artist

== Contestant progress ==
#	Contestant	Episode																											
#	Contestant	2	3	4	5	6	7	8	9	10	11	12	13	14	15	16	17	18	19	20	21	22	23	24	25	26	27	28	30–31
1	Katie			NOM		BTM2	NOM		TOP		WIN			WIN			5TH			WIN	WIN			WIN		WIN	WIN		WIN
2	Abby		LOSS														2ND	TOP3	NOM	3RD	6TH		WIN		NOM	WIN			OUT
2	Maki	WIN									WIN	2ND				NOM	6TH			4TH	T3							NOM	OUT
4	Lexxy				WIN					OUT			IN				1ST			6TH	2ND	NOM						OUT	
5	Tavis								LOSS	NOM							3RD	WIN		2ND	T3				OUT				
6	Monica					BTM2									WIN		4TH			5TH	5TH	OUT							
7	Erika							WIN				WIN					DQ	TOP3	OUT										
8	Trystan		WIN					WIN	TOP							OUT													
9	Nick					WIN			WIN				OUT																
9	Mac										WIN		OUT																
11	Ty						OUT																						
12	Alex			OUT																									

The artist won the grand prize.
The artist won a competitive challenge and nominated two others for elimination.
The artist won a social challenge.
The artist was explicitly mentioned as finishing well in the challenge.
The artist was explicitly mentioned as finishing poorly or losing the challenge.
The artist won an elimination challenge.
The artist lost an elimination challenge and was eliminated.
The artist returned after having been eliminated.

== Reception ==
Multiple reviewers praised the show's friendly, supportive tone, as opposed to trends in other reality TV shows to manufacture and present interpersonal tension and drama.
