= Super Battletank =

1992 video game

Garry Kitchen's Super Battletank: War in the Gulf
- Sega Genesis cover art
- Developer: Absolute Entertainment
- Publisher: Absolute Entertainment
- Designer: Garry Kitchen
- Programmers: Mark Morris; Nick Eastridge (GBA)
- Artists: Jesse Kapili; Gregory Faccone
- Composer: Mark Van Hecke
- Platforms: Mega Drive/Genesis, Game Gear, Game Boy, Super NES, Game Boy Advance (as Operation: Armored Liberty)
- Release: 1992; 2001 (Game Gear); 2003 (GBA)
- Genre: Simulation
- Mode: Single-player

Garry Kitchen's Super Battletank: War in the Gulf is a 1992 tank simulation single-player video game developed and published by Absolute Entertainment for the SNES. Taking place during Operation Desert Storm, the player controls an M1 Abrams main battle tank for the United Nations. A sequel, Super Battletank 2, was released for the SNES in 1994.

== Graphics ==
The screen is divided into two sections; one is the instrument panel in the gunner's station of the tank, and the other is a view of the outside, which consists primarily of the desert and military vehicles.

== Gameplay ==
The player battles helicopter gunships, T-72s, and Scud launchers, in pursuit of a military victory. The player had to use only M1 Abrams tank to play.

== Re-releases ==
Majesco released the game in 2001 for the Game Gear, as part of their licensed line of classic games for Game Gear, Mega Drive/Genesis, and Super NES, making it by far the last release in North America for the Game Gear. It was also remade as Operation: Armored Liberty for Game Boy Advance in 2003.

== Reception ==
Reception

Review scores
Publication	Score
Mean Machines	52%
Nintendo Power	67% (Note: Nintendo Power gave scores of 3.6, 3.2, 3.3, and 3.3 for "Graphics and Sound", "Play Control", "Challenge", and "Fun". Each category score is out of 5. 67% is the average aggregated score.)
Super Play	50%

Super Gamer reviewed the SNES version and gave an overall score of 54%. They praised the graphics, but called the gameplay as "repetitive".

Nintendo Power reviewed the SNES version and gave middling score, citing its lack of strategy.

== See also ==
- Battletank
