= Absolute Entertainment =

American video game publishing company

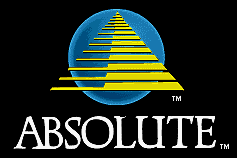
- Type: Private
- Industry: Video game publishing
- Genre: Action, sports, strategy
- Founded: 1986
- Founder: Garry Kitchen
- Defunct: 1995
- Fate: Bankruptcy
- Successor: Skyworks Technologies
- Headquarters: Upper Saddle River, New Jersey, United States
- Products: Video games
- Divisions: Imagineering

Absolute Entertainment was an American video game developer and publisher. Through its development division, Imagineering, Absolute Entertainment produced titles for the Atari 2600, Atari 7800, Game Gear, Genesis/Mega Drive, Sega CD, Game Boy, NES, and Super NES video game consoles, as well as for the Commodore 64, Apple II, and IBM PC compatibles.

== History ==
After leaving his position as a video game developer and designer at Activision, Garry Kitchen founded the company in 1986 with his brother Dan Kitchen, along with Alex DeMeo and John Van Ryzin. The company's headquarters was in Glen Rock, New Jersey, but later moved to another New Jersey borough, Upper Saddle River. The company had a distribution deal with Activision, later Mediagenic to distribute its titles. In 1988, after his brief stint at Hasbro, David Crane had joined the company. While the company was based in New Jersey, David Crane worked out of his home on the West Coast. The company's name was chosen because it was alphabetically above Activision, implying that Absolute Entertainment was superior to Activision. It was the same strategy that Activision chose when the programmers left Atari.

At Absolute Entertainment, Kitchen continued developing games for the Atari 2600 and Atari 7800, as he had done at Activision. However, the Nintendo Entertainment System (NES) had already displaced Atari's dominance of the video game console market. Kitchen swiftly shifted his focus to the NES, and produced several games for the platform, beginning with A Boy and His Blob: Trouble on Blobolonia in 1989, and Battle Tank in 1990. The company expanded and grew rapidly, to work for the SNES, starting with its first published title, Super Battletank: War in the Gulf.

Absolute Entertainment absorbed its studio Imagineering in 1992 to become itself a video game developer for the first time. In 1993, the company had acquired the assets of video game developer Extreme Entertainment Group from Micronet. Also that year, the company launched a West Coast satellite studio, led by Howard Phillips, formerly of Nintendo of America, LucasArts and THQ. In 1995, the company launched its division, Absolute Electronics, led by Garry Kitchen.

In the third quarter of 1995, Absolute Entertainment went bankrupt and suspended operations and laid off most of its staff. Since Kitchen had already formed a new company with David Crane called Skyworks Technologies, some of the employees transitioned to the new company.

== Imagineering ==
Imagineering was Absolute Entertainment's in-house development division based in Glen Rock, New Jersey, also founded in 1986, who also developed for third-party video game developers like Acclaim Entertainment, Atari Corporation, Activision, Hi Tech Expressions, Gametek and THQ. It was folded into Absolute Entertainment in 1992.

=== Games ===
==== 1987 ====
- X-15 Alpha Missions (Commodore 64)
- Skate Boardin' (Atari 2600)
- Title Match Pro Wrestling (Atari 2600, Atari 7800)

==== 1988 ====
- Pete Rose Baseball (Atari 2600, Atari 7800)
- F-18 Hornet (Commodore 64, Atari 7800)
- Super skateboardin' (Atari 7800)
- Commando (Atari 2600)
- Crossbow (Commodore 64, Atari 2600)
- Double Dragon (Atari 2600, Atari 7800)
- River Raid II (Atari 2600)

==== 1989 ====
- Ikari Warriors (Atari 2600, Atari 7800)
- Stealth ATF (NES)
- Touchdown Football (Atari 7800)
- Fight Night (Atari 7800)
- Tomcat: The F-14 Fighter Simulator (Atari 2600, Atari 7800)

==== 1990 ====
- Battletank (NES)
- Sentinel (Atari 2600, Atari 7800)
- Destination Earthstar (NES)
- A Boy and His Blob: Trouble on Blobolonia (NES)
- Ghostbusters II (NES)
- My Golf (Atari 2600)
- Heavy Shreddin' (NES)
- R.C. Grand Prix (Master System, Game Gear)

==== 1991 ====
- Attack of the Killer Tomatoes (NES)
- The Simpsons: Bart vs. the Space Mutants (NES)
- The Simpsons: Bart vs. the World (NES)
- Bart Simpson's Escape from Camp Deadly (Game Boy)
- Flight of the Intruder (NES)
- Home Alone (Super NES, Game Boy)
- Barbie (NES)
- Space Shuttle Project (NES)

==== 1992 ====
- The Adventures of Rocky and Bullwinkle and Friends (Game Boy)
- The Simpsons: Bart vs. The Juggernauts (Game Boy)
- The Simpsons: Bartman Meets Radioactive Man (NES)
- Home Alone 2: Lost in New York (NES, Super NES, Game Boy)
- Jeopardy! (Super NES)
- Swamp Thing (NES)
- Mouse Trap Hotel (Game Boy)
- Ghoul School (NES)
- Barbie: Game Girl (Game Boy)
- The Ren & Stimpy Show: Space Cadet Adventures (Game Boy)
- Jordan vs. Bird: One on One (Game Boy)
- Race Drivin' (Super NES)
- Redline F-1 Racer (SNES)
- Race America NA version (NES)
- Turn and Burn: The F-14 Dogfight Simulator (Game Boy)
- David Crane's Amazing Tennis (SNES, Genesis)
- Super Battletank

==== 1993 ====
- The Adventures of Rocky and Bullwinkle and Friends (Super NES)
- Family Feud (Super NES)
- The Ren & Stimpy Show: Buckaroo$! (NES, SNES)
- Star Trek: The Next Generation (SNES, Genesis)
- Family Dog (SNES)
- Goofy's Hysterical History Tour (Genesis)
- Jeopardy!: Deluxe Edition (Genesis, SNES)
- Space Age (SNES)
- Toys (SNES, Genesis)

==== 1994 ====
- A/X-101 (Sega CD)
- Star Trek Generations: Beyond the Nexus (Game Boy, Game Gear)
- Jeopardy! Sports Edition (Game Boy, Game Gear, Mac, MS-DOS, Genesis, SNES)
- Rise of the Robots (Amiga, CD32, MS-DOS, SNES, Mega Drive, Game Gear, 3DO, CD-i, Arcade)
- Turn and Burn: No-Fly Zone (SNES)
- Wheel of Fortune (Sega CD)
- Super Battletank 2 (SNES)
- ESPN Sunday Night NFL
- Home Improvement: Power Tool Pursuit! (Super NES)
- Penn & Teller's Smoke and Mirrors (Sega CD)

==== 1995 ====
- Rapid Deployment Force: Global Conflict (Sega CD)
- Activision Atari Battle Pack 3 (Windows)

==== 1996 ====
- Casper (SNES)
