= Goofy's Hysterical History Tour =

1994 video game

- Developer: Absolute Entertainment
- Publisher: Absolute Entertainment
- Platform: Genesis
- Release: NA: January 1994
- Genre: Platform
- Mode: Single-player

Goofy's Hysterical History Tour is a 1994 platform game, based on Disney's Mickey Mouse series, developed and published by Absolute Entertainment for Sega Genesis. The player controls Goofy as he daydreams about what it would be like to live in the past.

== Plot ==
Goofy has taken up the job of janitor at a history museum curated by Ludwig Von Drake. However, Goofy has been disrupting the workflow of the museum through his antics, which has been reported to Ludwig by his rival Pete, who also works as a janitor at the museum. Because of this, Ludwig talks with Goofy on the eve of the opening of four new exhibits telling him that if he doesn't get his act together he will have to fire him. However, Goofy has constructed an "Extend-O-Hand" invention that will help him with his job and because of this Ludwig says that if Goofy does a good job he will be promoted to the head janitor position. Pete, who had overheard the conversation, is enraged by the fact that Goofy has the chance to be rewarded and so moves items away from their intended exhibits in order to frame Goofy.

Goofy goes to each of the four exhibits to clean them, however at each one he ends up daydreaming which leads to him accidentally knocking himself out, leading to him dreaming that he is in a historical time period; such as the Middle Ages and the Paleolithic Era. When Goofy comes to, he ends up finishing his cleaning duties and grabs the out of place item so he can return it to the correct exhibit. After the last item is placed back at its respective exhibit, the museum is opened for the grand opening of the new exhibits. After the grand opening has concluded, Ludwig congratulates Goofy on his superb cleaning skills and promotes him to head janitor as promised. Ludwig also learns of Pete's deception, but he decides to give him a second chance at his job. Pete apologizes to Goofy for the way he acted and asks to see how his "Extend-O-Hand" gadget works. Goofy shows him but then accidentally hits him with it, remarking that it could use some reworks.

== Reception ==
Reception

Review scores
Publication	Score
Mean Machines Sega	68/100
Electronic Gaming Monthly	5/10

Electronic Gaming Monthly berated the game as not "up to the level of the other Disney video game releases", and criticized the controls. Gus Swan, writing for Mean Machines Sega, divulged similar sentiments, describing the gameplay as "neither wildly exciting or totally predictable".
