= Video game graphics =

Computer graphics related to video games

A variety of computer graphic techniques have been used to display video game content throughout the history of video games. The predominance of individual techniques have evolved over time, primarily due to hardware advances and restrictions such as the processing power of central or graphics processing units.

== Text-based ==
Some of the earliest video games were text games or text-based games that used text characters instead of bitmapped or vector graphics. Examples include MUDs (multi-user dungeons), where players could read or view depictions of rooms, objects, other players, and actions performed in the virtual world; and roguelikes, a subgenre of role-playing video games featuring many monsters, items, and environmental effects, as well as an emphasis on randomization, replayability and permanent death. Some of the earliest text games were developed for computer systems which had no video display at all.

Text games are typically easier to write and require less processing power than graphical games, and thus were more common from 1970 to 1990. However, terminal emulators are still in use today, and people continue to play MUDs and explore interactive fiction. Many beginning programmers still create these types of games to familiarize themselves with a programming language, and contests are still held even today on who can finish programming a roguelike within a short time period, such as seven days.

== Vector graphics ==
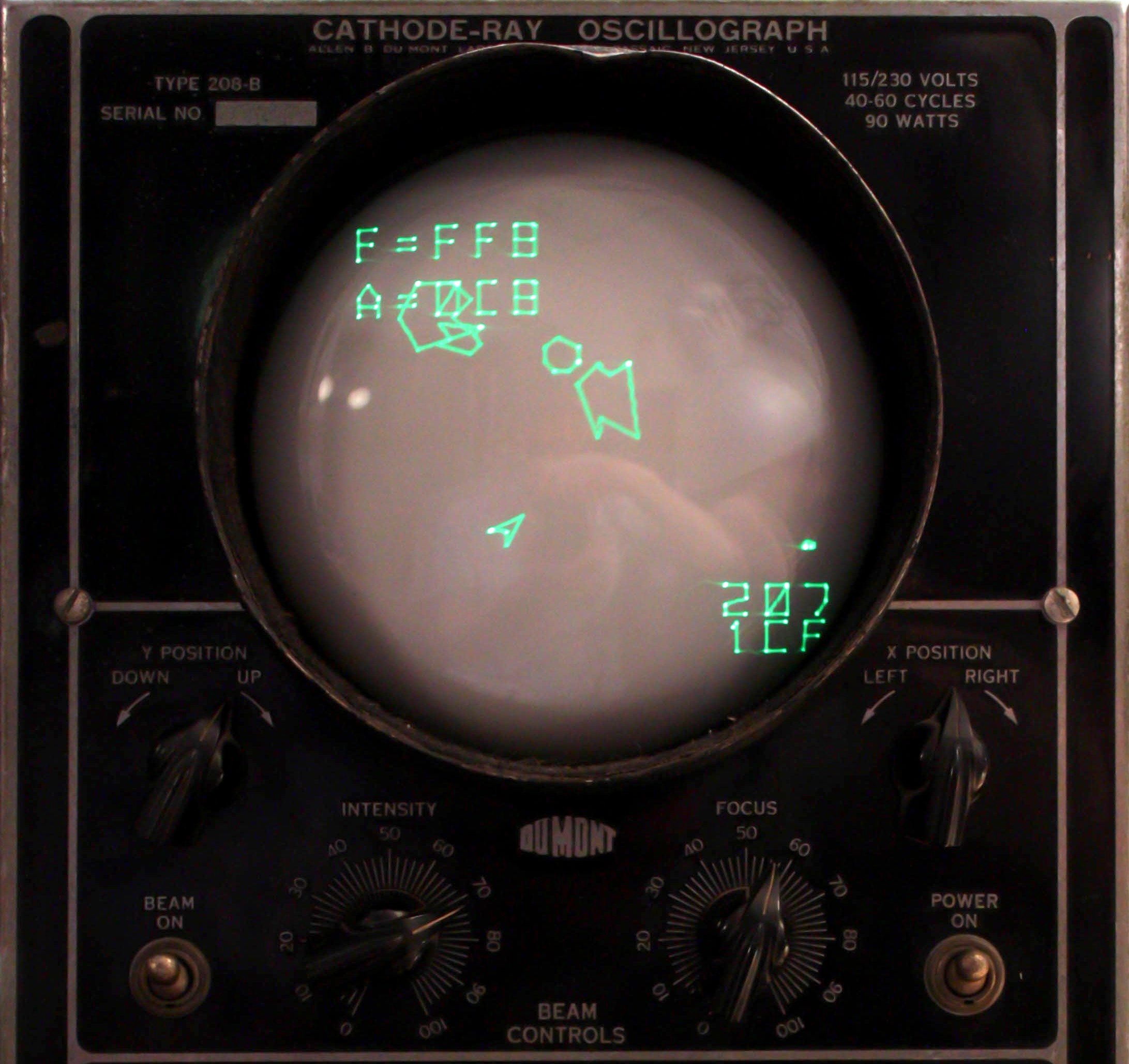
Asteroids-clone played on an oscillograph configured as a vector display

Vector graphics refer to the use of geometrical primitives such as points, lines, and curves (i.e., shapes based on mathematical equations) instead of resolution-dependent bitmap graphics to represent images in computer graphics. In video games this type of projection is somewhat rare, but has become more common in recent years in browser-based gaming with the advent of Flash and HTML5 Canvas, as these support vector graphics natively. An earlier example for the personal computer is Starglider (1986).

Vector game can also refer to a video game that uses a vector graphics display capable of projecting images using an electron beam to draw images instead of with pixels, much like a laser show. Many early arcade games used such displays, as they were capable of displaying more detailed images than raster displays on the hardware available at that time. Many vector-based arcade games used full-color overlays to complement the otherwise monochrome vector images. Other uses of these overlays were very detailed drawings of the static gaming environment, while the moving objects were drawn by the vector beam. Games of this type were produced mainly by Atari, Cinematronics, and Sega. Examples of vector games include Asteroids, Armor Attack, Aztarac, Eliminator, Lunar Lander, Space Fury, Space Wars, Star Trek, Tac/Scan, Tempest and Zektor. The Vectrex home console also used a vector display. After 1985, the use of vector graphics declined substantially due to improvements in sprite technology; rasterized 3D Filled Polygon Graphics returned to the arcades and were so popular that vector graphics could no longer compete.

== Full motion video ==
Full motion video (FMV) games are video games that rely upon pre-recorded television- or movie-quality recordings and animations rather than sprites, vectors or 3D models to display action in the game. FMV-based games were popular during the early 1990s as CD-ROMs and Laserdiscs made their way into the living rooms, providing an alternative to the low-capacity ROM cartridges of most consoles at the time. Although FMV-based games did manage to look better than many contemporary sprite-based games, they occupied a niche market; and a vast majority of FMV games were panned at the time of their release, with many gamers citing their dislike for the lack of interaction inherent in these games. As a result, the format became a well-known failure in video gaming, and the popularity of FMV games declined substantially after 1995 as more advanced consoles started to become widely available.

A number of different types of games utilized this format. Some resembled modern music/dance games, where the player timely presses buttons according to a screen instruction. Others included early rail shooters such as Tomcat Alley, Surgical Strike and Sewer Shark. Full motion video was also used in several interactive movie adventure games, such as The Beast Within: A Gabriel Knight Mystery and Phantasmagoria.

== 2D ==
Games utilizing parallel projection typically make use of two-dimensional bitmap graphics as opposed to 3D-rendered triangle-based geometry, allowing developers to create large, complex gameworlds efficiently and with relatively few art assets by dividing the art into sprites or tiles and reusing them repeatedly (though some games use a mix of different techniques).

=== Top-down perspective ===
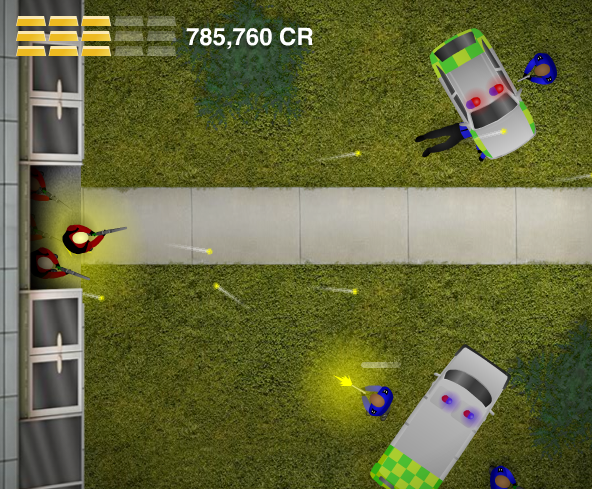
An example of a typical top-down, third-person view game, The Heist 2

Top-down perspective, also sometimes referred to as bird's-eye view, Overworld, Godview, overhead view, or helicopter view, when used in the context of video games, refers to a camera angle that shows players and the areas around them from above. While not exclusive to video games utilizing parallel projection, it was at one time common among 2D role playing video games, wargames, and construction and management simulation games, such as SimCity, Pokémon, and Railroad Tycoon; as well as among action and action-adventure games, such as the early The Legend of Zelda, Metal Gear, and Grand Theft Auto games.

=== Side-scrolling game ===
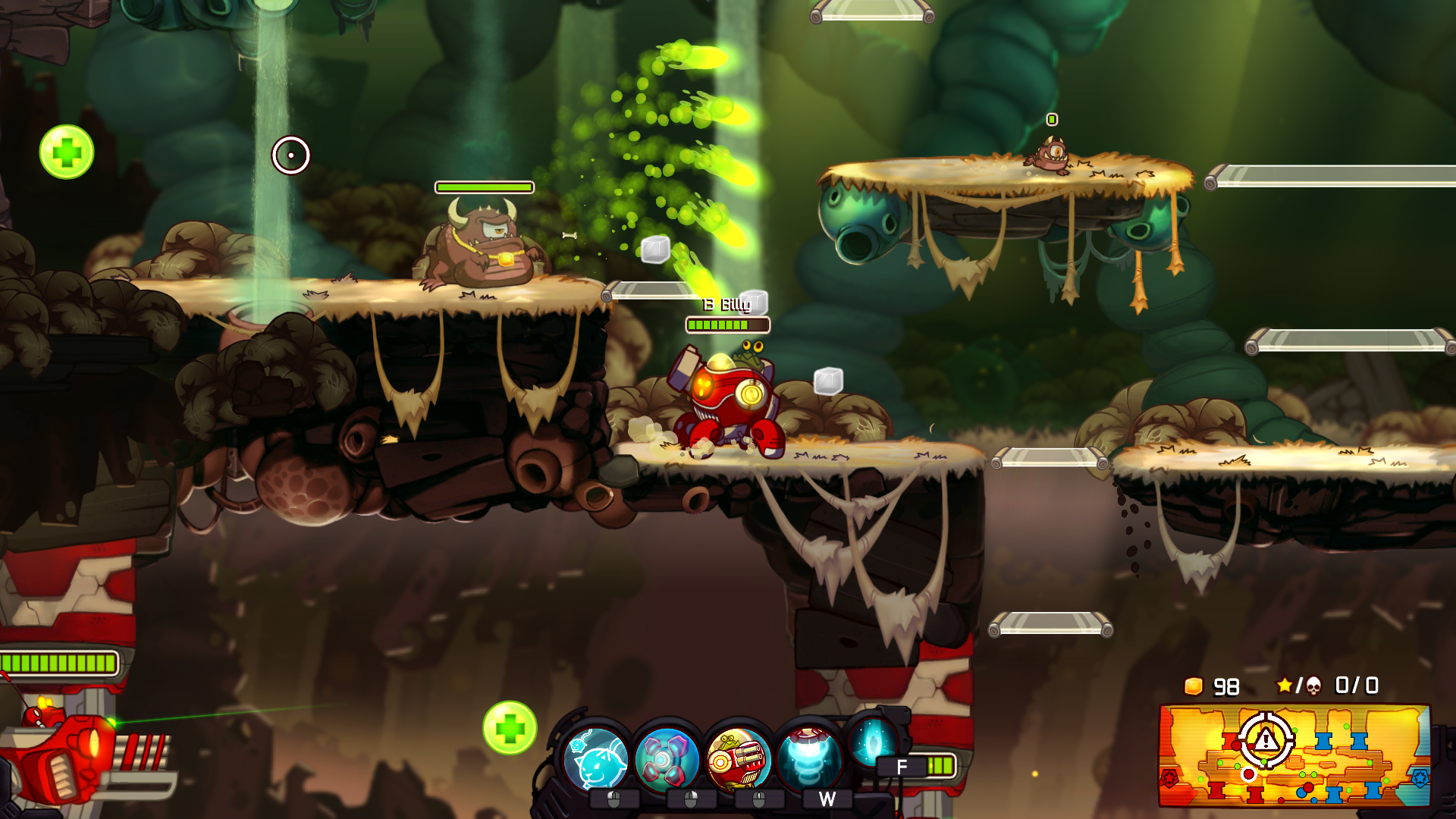
Awesomenauts is a side scrolling MOBA game.

A side-scrolling game or side-scroller is a video game in which the viewpoint is taken from the side, and the onscreen characters generally can only move to the left or right, though they often have a degree of control over their vertical movement, usually by jumping. Games of this type make use of scrolling computer display technology, and sometimes parallax scrolling to suggest added depth.

In many games the screen follows the player character such that the player character is always positioned near the center of the screen. In other games the position of the screen will change according to the player character's movement, such that the player character is off-center and more space is shown in front of the character than behind. Sometimes, the screen will scroll not only forward in the speed and direction of the player character's movement, but also backwards to previously visited parts of a stage. In other games or stages, the screen will only scroll forwards, not backwards, so that once a stage has been passed it can no longer be visited. In games such as shoot 'em ups like R-type, the screen scrolls forward by itself at a steady rate, and the player must keep up with the screen, attempting to avoid obstacles and collect things before they pass off screen.

Examples of side-scrolling games include platform games such as Sonic the Hedgehog and Ori and the Blind Forest, beat 'em ups such as the popular Double Dragon and Battletoads, and shooters such as R-Type and (more recently) Jets'n'Guns. The Super Mario Bros. series has used all three types of side-scrolling at some time in its history.

=== 2.5D, 3/4 perspective, and pseudo-3D ===
2.5D ("two-and-a-half-dimensional"), 3/4 perspective and pseudo-3D are informal terms used to describe graphical projections and techniques that try to "fake" three-dimensionality, typically by using some form of parallel projection, wherein the point of view is from a fixed perspective, but also reveals multiple facets of an object. Examples of pseudo-3D techniques include isometric/axonometric projection, oblique projection, orthographic projection, billboarding, parallax scrolling, scaling, skyboxes, and skydomes. In addition, 3D graphical techniques such as bump mapping and parallax mapping are often used to extend the illusion of three-dimensionality without substantially increasing the resulting computational overhead introduced by larger numbers of polygons (also known as the "polygon count").

These terms sometimes possess a second meaning, wherein the gameplay in an otherwise 3D game is forcibly restricted to a two-dimensional plane.

Examples of games that make use of pseudo-3D techniques include Zaxxon, The Sims and Diablo (isometric/axonometric projection); Ultima VII and Paperboy (oblique projection); Sonic the Hedgehog and Street Fighter II (parallax scrolling); Fonz and Space Harrier (scaling); and Half-Life 2 (skyboxes). In addition to axonometric projection, games such as The Sims and Final Fantasy Tactics also make use of a combination of pre-drawn 2D sprites and real-time polygonal graphics instead of relying entirely on 2D sprites as is the norm.

== 3D ==
With the advent of 3D accelerated graphics, video games could expand beyond the typically sprite-based 2D graphics of older graphics technologies to describe a view frequently more true to reality and lifelike than their predecessors. Federica Romagnoli has stated that in her opinion, high-budget 3D game graphics "display...levels of artistry once more commonly found in films" because of their capability to render complex cinematography and CG characters and the optimization of video game consoles and PCs to be able to handle such content. Perspective projection has also been used in some earlier titles to present a 3D view from a fixed (and thus somewhat less hardware-intensive) perspective with a limited ability to move.

=== Voxel engines ===
Instead of using triangle meshes, voxel engines use voxels.

=== Fixed 3D ===
Fixed 3D refers to a three-dimensional representation of the game world where foreground objects (i.e. game characters) are typically rendered in real time against a static background. The principal advantage of this technique is its ability to display a high level of detail on minimal hardware. The main disadvantage is that the player's frame of reference remains fixed at all times, preventing players from examining or moving about the environment from multiple viewpoints.

Backgrounds in fixed 3D games tend to be pre-rendered two-dimensional images, but are sometimes rendered in real time (e.g. Blade Runner). The developers of SimCity 4 took advantage of fixed perspective by not texturing the reverse sides of objects (and thereby speeding up rendering) which players could not see anyway. Fixed 3D is also sometimes used to "fake" areas which are inaccessible to players. The Legend of Zelda: Ocarina of Time, for instance, is nearly completely 3D, but uses fixed 3D to represent many of the building interiors as well as one entire town (this technique was later dropped in favor of full-3D in the game's successor, The Legend of Zelda: Majora's Mask). A similar technique, the skybox, is used in many 3D games to represent distant background objects that are not worth rendering in real time.

Used heavily in the survival horror genre, fixed 3D was first seen in Infogrames' Alone in the Dark series in the early 1990s and imitated by titles such as Ecstatica. It was later brought back by Capcom in the Resident Evil series. Gameplay-wise there is little difference between fixed 3D games and their 2D precursors. Players' ability to navigate within a scene still tends to be limited, and interaction with the gameworld remains mostly "point-and-click".

Further examples include the PlayStation-era titles in the Final Fantasy series (Square); the role-playing games Parasite Eve and Parasite Eve II (Square); the action-adventure games Ecstatica and Ecstatica 2 (Andrew Spencer/Psygnosis), as well as Little Big Adventure (Adeline Software International); the graphic adventure Grim Fandango (LucasArts); and 3D Movie Maker (Microsoft Kids).

Pre-rendered backgrounds are also found in some isometric video games, such as the role-playing game The Temple of Elemental Evil (Troika Games) and the Baldur's Gate series (BioWare); though in these cases the form of graphical projection used is not different.

=== First-person perspective ===
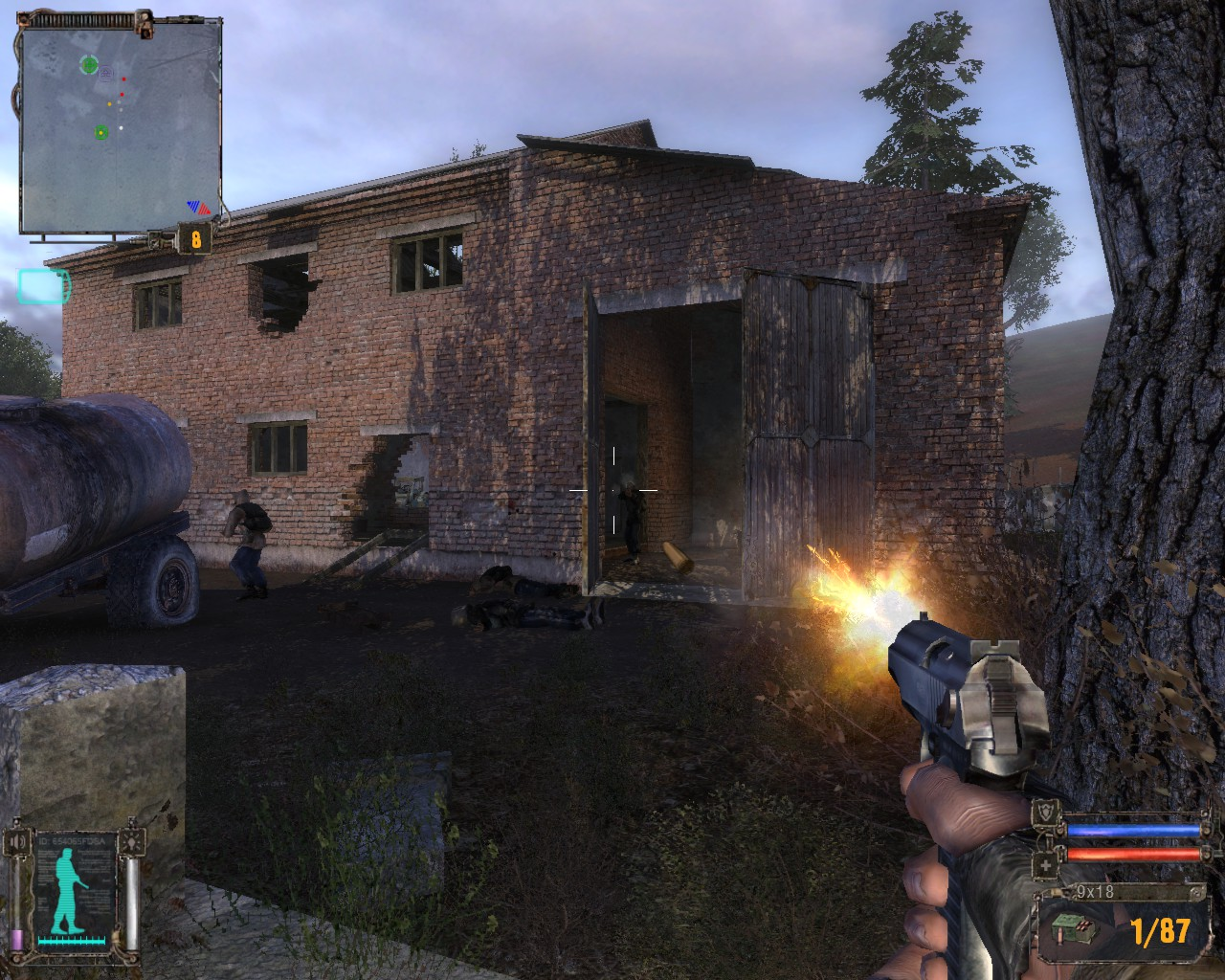
First-person perspective as seen in STALKER: Shadow of Chernobyl (2007)

First person refers to a graphical perspective rendered from the viewpoint of the player character. In many cases, this may be the viewpoint from the cockpit of a vehicle. Many different genres have made use of first-person perspectives, including adventure games, flight simulators, and the highly popular first-person shooter genre.

Games with a first-person perspective are usually avatar-based, wherein the game displays what the player's avatar would see with the avatar's own eyes. In many games, players cannot see the avatar's body, though they may be able to see the avatar's weapons or hands. This viewpoint is also frequently used to represent the perspective of a driver within a vehicle, as in flight and racing simulators; and it is common to make use of positional audio, where the volume of ambient sounds varies depending on their position with respect to the player's avatar.

Games with a first-person perspective do not require sophisticated animations for the player's avatar, and do not need to implement a manual or automated camera-control scheme as in third-person perspective. A first person perspective allows for easier aiming, since there is no representation of the avatar to block the player's view. However, the absence of an avatar can make it difficult to master the timing and distances required to jump between platforms, and may cause motion sickness in some players.

Players have come to expect first-person games to accurately scale objects to appropriate sizes. However, key objects such as dropped items or levers may be exaggerated in order to improve their visibility.

=== Third-person perspective ===
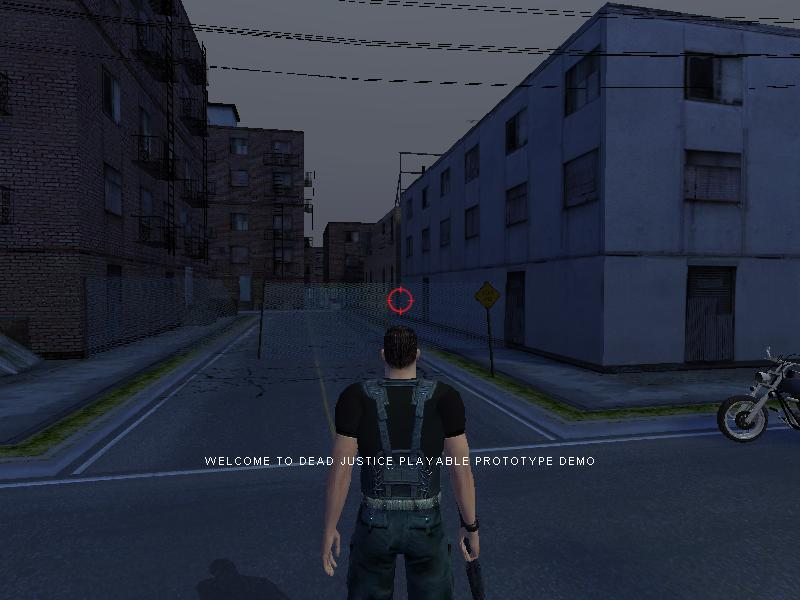
Screenshot from the third-person shooter Dead Justice

Third person refers to a graphical perspective rendered from a view that is some distance away (usually behind and slightly above) from the player's character. This viewpoint allows players to see a more strongly characterized avatar, and is most common in action and action-adventure games. This viewpoint poses some difficulties, however, in that when the player turns or stands with his back to a wall, the camera may jerk or end up in awkward positions. Developers have tried to alleviate this issue by implementing intelligent camera systems, or by giving the player control over the camera. There are three primary types of third-person camera systems: "fixed camera systems" in which the camera positions are set during the game creation; "tracking camera systems" in which the camera simply follows the player's character; and "interactive camera systems" that are under the player's control. The latter two are often combined, where the camera automatically adjusts based on the movement of the player character, but can ultimately be overridden by player input.

Examples of games utilizing third-person perspective include Super Mario 64, as well as other 3D Mario games (Sunshine, Galaxy, etc.), the Tomb Raider series, the 3D installments of the Legend of Zelda series, and Crash Bandicoot.

== Other topics ==
=== Stereo graphics ===
Stereoscopic video games use stereoscopic technologies to create depth perception for the player by any form of stereo display. Such games are not to be confused with video games that use 3D computer graphics, which although they feature graphics on screen, do not give the illusion of depth beyond the screen.

=== Virtual reality headset ===
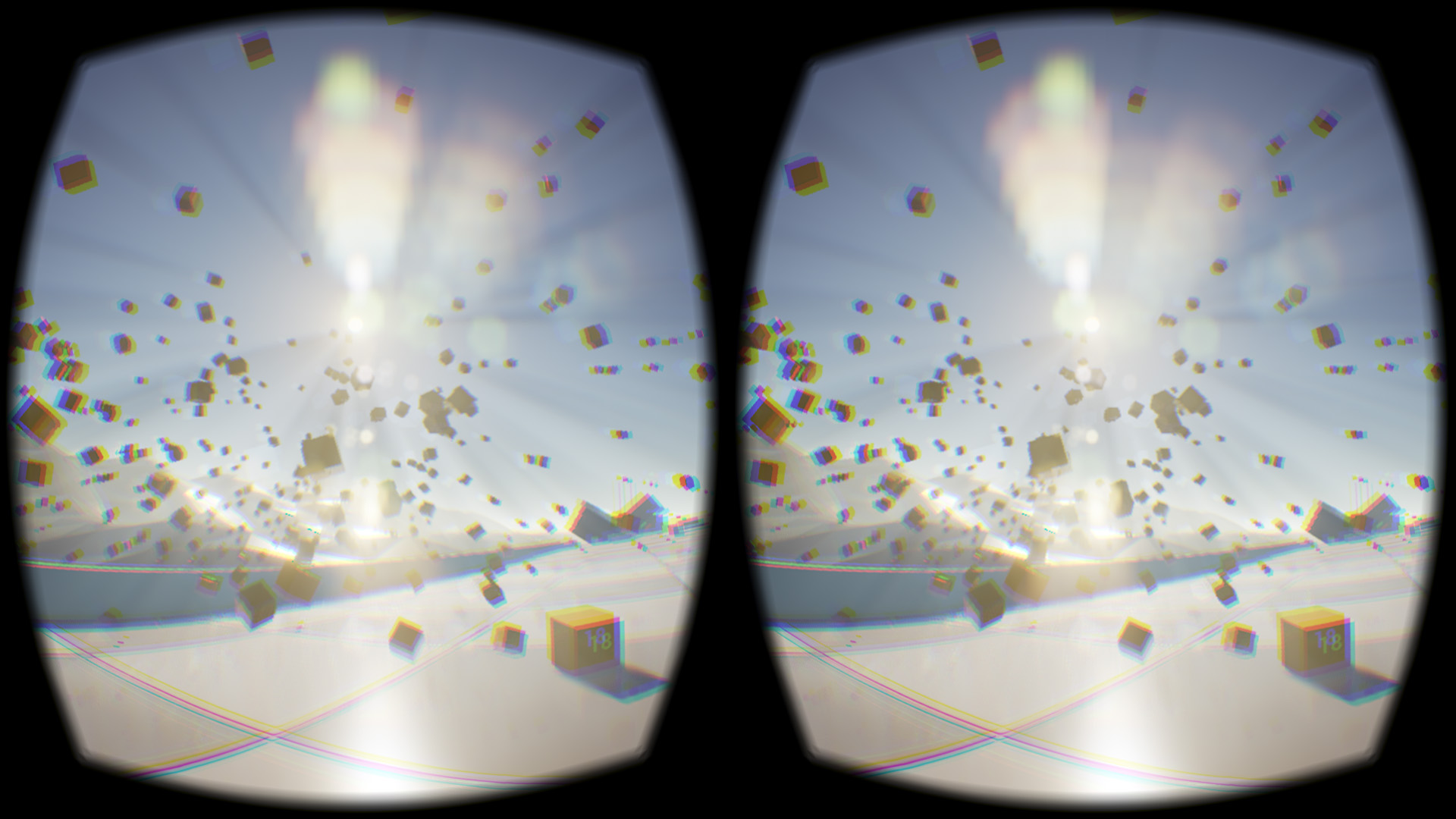
Image captured from Oculus Rift DK2, showing compensation for lens distortion and chromatic aberration

The graphics for virtual reality gaming consist of a special kind of stereoscopic 3D graphics to fit the up-close display. The requirements for latency are also higher to reduce the potential for virtual reality sickness.

=== Multi-monitor setup ===
Many games can run multi-monitor setups to achieve very high display resolutions. Running games in this way can create a greater sense of immersion, e.g. when playing a video racing game or flight simulator or give a tactical advantage due to the higher field of view.

=== Augmented reality ===
Augmented reality games typically use 3D graphics on a single flat screen on a smartphone or tablet, or in a head-mounted display. When playing an AR game on a head-mounted device, the visuals are displayed on transparent glass that overlays the real world and has 3D depth through stereoscopic display.

== See also ==
Technical aspects

- 2D computer graphics
- 3D computer graphics
- Real-time computer graphics
- Rendering
- Image-based modeling and rendering
- Game art design
- Video games
- Computer graphics
- Game engine
- Sprite

Game genres and gameplay

- Video game genres
- Gameplay
- Graphic adventure games
- Text-based games
