= Blasto =

Blasto may refer to:

- Blastomycosis, a fungal disease
- Blasto (arcade game), a 1978 action game
- Blasto (video game), a 1998 third-person-shooter
- Blasto (singer) (Otis Chilamba), Malawian reggae and dancehall singer
- Captain Blasto, a character from Rugrats
