= Tranquilizer Gun (video game) =

1980 video game

- Japanese arcade flyer
- Developer: Sega (Note: SG-1000 version developed by Compile.)
- Publishers: Arcade: JP: Sega; NA: Sega/Gremlin; SG-1000; Sega
- Platforms: Arcade, SG-1000
- Release: Arcade: JP: June 1980; NA: September 1980; SG-1000: JP: August 1983; PAL: November 1983
- Genre: Shooter
- Modes: Single-player, multiplayer

Tranquilizer Gun (Note: Japanese: トランキライザーガン, Hepburn: Torankiraizā Gan) is a 1980 shooter video game developed and published by Sega for Japanese arcades; in North America, it was distributed by Sega/Gremlin.

== Gameplay ==
Screenshot

The player controls a yellow hunter, and must kill all the animals and bring them back to his truck. The player, after shooting an animal, has 30 seconds to bring the animal back to the truck through the six exits in the stage. Once an animal is brought into the truck, the number under the animal's head placed on the truck will be raised by one, and once all the animals have been brought back to the truck, the player moves onto the next stage. The player will receive a 10% bonus if the player doesn't waste any shots while killing the animals.

== Release ==
The game was ported to the SG-1000 in 1983 under the name Safari Hunting (サファリハンティング, Safari Hantingu), and was developed by Compile. It was later included as a bonus game in Dynamite Cop, where it kept the original name. The original game was also included in Sega Ages 2500 Vol. 23: Sega Memorial Selection for the PlayStation 2 in 2005; that compilation was later released for the PlayStation Network in 2012 with the Sega Ages label removed.

== Sources ==
- Tranquilizer Gun トランキライザー・ガン
- Tranquilizer Gun / Tranquillizer Gun (トランキライザーガン / Safari Hunting (サファリハンティング) - Arcade, SG-1000, Dreamcast, PlayStation 2, Mobile (1980)
