= Galaxy Rangers =

Galaxy Ranger may refer to:

- Kyōryū Sentai Zyuranger, a 1992 Japanese tokusatsu television series (the title used for international distribution is Galaxy Rangers)
- The Adventures of the Galaxy Rangers, a 1986 American animated Space Western television series
- Star Blazer (1983 LaserDisc game), a 1983 LaserDisc arcade game by Sega. Known as Galaxy Ranger in North America
