= Space Fury =

1981 arcade game

- North American arcade flyer
- Developer: Gremlin
- Publishers: Arcade: NA: Sega/Gremlin; JP: Sega; ColecoVision: NA: Coleco
- Platforms: Arcade, ColecoVision
- Release: Arcade: NA: June 1981; JP: July 1981; ColecoVision: NA: March 1983
- Genre: Multidirectional shooter
- Modes: Single-player, multiplayer
- Arcade system: G80

Space Fury is a multidirectional shooter arcade game developed by Gremlin. Sega/Gremlin released the game in North America in June 1981, and then Sega released it in Japan the following month. It is the first game with color vector graphics, and was Sega's second game to use speech synthesis. Coleco published a ColecoVision version with raster graphics in 1983.

== Gameplay ==
Arcade screenshot

The player controls a spaceship battling alien spacecraft. It is controlled by four buttons: rotate left, rotate right, thrust, and fire. The player could collect different upgrades for the first three levels. One upgrade allows the player to shoot in a three-way pattern, the second allows the player to fire forward and backwards simultaneously, and the third concentrates firepower in the front.

At the conclusion of the following round, the player picks another shell, although multiple ones cannot be used together. Between rounds and during the attract mode, the Alien Commander taunts the player through the use of synthesized speech. The game continues indefinitely but stops calculating the score after the completion of level four.

At the beginning of each level, a synthesized excerpt from Aaron Copland's Fanfare for the Common Man is played.

=== Alien Commander's quotes ===
1. "Does anyone dare challenge my Imperial fleet?"
2. "So! A creature for my amusement. Prepare for battle!"
3. "So you defeated my scouts? Well, my cruisers will destroy you."
4. "You are starting to annoy me, Creature. My destroyers will annihilate you!"
5. "You survived! Warships, dispose of this annoyance at once!"
6. "Well done. Prepare to battle my entire fleet!"
7. "Our battle is completed, Warrior. You were an [easy / amusing / adequate / stimulating / outstanding] opponent" (depending on score).

== Development ==
Space Fury was the first released vector graphics game to use a color monitor, developed by Electrohome. This X-Y monitor became a standard piece of kit in the G-80 graphics system developed at Sega/Gremlin as an interchangeable arcade system which could feature either a vector or raster game in the arcade cabinet.

The game was developed and programmed by Sega/Gremlin game designer Murphy Bivens and shares a resemblance to Atari's Asteroids. Bivens notably reduced the amount of inertia the ship experienced while moving in any direction while keeping features such as the screen wrap-around. To make the gameplay more interesting, he also added the option for players to choose a variable weapon between stages. This marks the first instance of a shoot 'em up game providing players with the option to upgrade their ship's firepower.

One additional innovation of Space Fury was the use of a character who provided lines via speech synthesis, an alien commander. The speech was generated using the General Instrument SP0256-19 chip (the same one found in the Magnavox Odyssey 2 Voice Module) with voice samples provided by a DJ with a deep voice which was easier to modulate. The same voice actor would be responsible for the voice clips used in Star Trek: Strategic Operations Simulator.

The monitors used in the game (the G08) were infamous for being unreliable, due to a deflector amplification circuit put in place by the company Electrohome. Reportedly this circuit was in place to circumnavigate vector technology patented by Atari, but caused a great deal of electronic failure as the machines were powered on and off. Later revisions of the G08 vector monitors amended this problem.

== Reception ==
Raymond Dimetrosky of Video Games Player gave the ColecoVision version a generally positive review. He called the original arcade game "one of the best games to follow in the wake of Asteroids" while praising the accuracy of the conversion. He criticized the lack of the arcade game's speech synthesis, but praised the replacement music. He also compared the game unfavorably with another ColecoVision arcade port released about the same time, Nintendo's Donkey Kong Jr.

== Legacy ==
The alien commander who appears in the game and on the marquee also makes an appearance in the video game Zektor, also designed by Murphy Bivens and released by Sega/Gremlin.

The game is included as an unlockable game in the PSP version of Sega Genesis Collection.
