= Noval =

Noval may refer to:

== People ==
- Benjamín Noval (born 1979), Spanish bicycle racer
- Luis Martínez Noval (1948–2013), Spanish economist and politician
- Tomás Noval (1914–1981), Cuban baseball player

== Technology ==
- Noval 760, a home computer

== See also ==
- Koval (surname)
- Novak
