= Deep Scan =

1979 video game

- North American arcade flyer
- Developer: Sega
- Publishers: Arcade: JP: Sega; NA: Sega/Gremlin; 2600; Sega
- Platforms: Arcade, Atari 2600
- Release: Arcade: NA: November 1979; JP: January 1980; 2600: March 1983
- Genre: Fixed shooter
- Mode: Single-player

Deep Scan is a fixed shooter developed and published by Sega. It was released in Japan in 1979 as an arcade video game; in North America, it was distributed by Sega/Gremlin. The player controls a battleship on the surface of the ocean attempting to destroy submarines below it, similar to games such as Periscope (1965), Sea Wolf (1976) and Depthcharge (1977). Some arcade cabinets also include Invinco, a Space Invaders clone released by Sega in 1979.

A port to the Atari 2600 was published in 1983 as Sub-Scan.

== Gameplay ==
Gameplay screenshot

Most of the screen is a side view of the water with enemy submarines patrolling in it. The goal is to destroy as many submarines as possible by dropping explosives from either the left or right side of the ship while avoiding mines launched from these submarines. A mini-map at the bottom of the screen shows submarines coming from the sides, before they are visible.

== Legacy ==
Deep Scan is a bonus game in the Sega Saturn version of Die Hard Arcade. Every 200 points earned gives the player an extra credit for the disc's title game.
