= Head-coupled perspective =

Technique to show 3D imagery on 2D devices

Head-coupled perspective is a technique to show 3D imagery on 2D devices. The perspective of the scene on the screen is based on the position of the user’s eyes, simulating a 3D environment. When the user moves their head, the perspective of the scene changes, creating the effect of looking through a window to the scene instead of looking at a flat projection of a scene.

== See also ==
- 3D rendering
- 3D computer graphics
- Perspective (visual)
- Eye tracking
- Video tracking
- Amazon Fire Phone's Dynamic Perspective
