= Sega Genesis Collection =

2006 video game compilation

- North American cover art
- Developer: Digital Eclipse
- Publisher: Sega
- Platforms: PlayStation 2, PlayStation Portable
- Release: PlayStation 2: NA: November 7, 2006; EU: February 2, 2007; AU: February 8, 2007; PlayStation Portable: NA: November 16, 2006; EU: February 2, 2007; AU: February 8, 2007
- Genre: Various
- Modes: Single-player, multiplayer

Sega Genesis Collection (Sega Mega Drive Collection in PAL regions) is a compilation of video games developed by Digital Eclipse and published by Sega for PlayStation 2 and PlayStation Portable. The collection includes twenty-eight Sega Genesis games from a variety of genres, as well as unlockable classic Sega arcade games, with different sets of arcade games for the PlayStation 2 and PlayStation Portable versions. A sequel was released in 2009 called Sonic's Ultimate Genesis Collection for PlayStation 3 and Xbox 360.

== List of games ==
=== Sega Genesis ===
- Alex Kidd in the Enchanted Castle (1989)
- Altered Beast (1988)
- Bonanza Bros. (1991)
- Columns (1990)
- Comix Zone (1995)
- Decap Attack (1991)
- Ecco the Dolphin (1992)
- Ecco: The Tides of Time (1994)
- Ecco Jr. (1995) †
- Flicky (1991)
- Gain Ground (1991)
- Golden Axe (1989)
- Golden Axe II (1991)
- Golden Axe III (1993)
- Kid Chameleon (1992)
- Phantasy Star II (1989)
- Phantasy Star III: Generations of Doom (1990)
- Phantasy Star IV: The End of the Millennium (1993)
- Ristar (1995)
- Shadow Dancer: The Secret of Shinobi (1990) † / ††
- Shinobi III: Return of the Ninja Master (1993)
- Sonic the Hedgehog (1991)
- Sonic the Hedgehog 2 (1992)
- Super Thunder Blade (1988)
- Sword of Vermilion (1989) †
- Vectorman (1995)
- Vectorman 2 (1996)
- Virtua Fighter 2 (1996) †

† Not available in Sonic's Ultimate Genesis Collection.
†† Not available in the PAL release.

=== Unlockable extra games ===
This collection also features more than thirty-five minutes of unlockable interviews from Sega of Japan, a "museum" with facts about the games, strategy tips and box art for each game, as well as a "Sega Cheat Sheet" that consists of cheat codes for most games, and a set of unlockable arcade games, (some of which are from the early Sega/Gremlin era). The collection also contains unlockable trailers for Phantasy Star Universe and Virtua Fighter 5.

==== PlayStation 2 ====
- Altered Beast (arcade) [1988]
- Future Spy (arcade) [1984] †
- Tac/Scan (arcade) [1982] †
- Zaxxon (arcade) [1981]
- Zektor (arcade) [1982] †

==== PlayStation Portable ====
- Astro Blaster (arcade) [1981] †
- Congo Bongo (arcade) (under original title Tip Top in some regions) [1983]
- Eliminator (arcade) [1981] †
- Space Fury [1981] (arcade) †
- Super Zaxxon (arcade) [1982] †

† Not available in Sonic's Ultimate Genesis Collection.

== Reception ==
Reception

Aggregate score
Aggregator	Score
Metacritic	(PS2) 82/100 (PSP) 82/100

Review scores
Publication	Score
GameSpot	8.2/10
IGN	8.6/10

Sega Genesis Collection received "generally favorable" reviews, according to review aggregator website Metacritic.
