= Turbo (video game) =

1981 video game

- North American arcade flyer
- Developer: Sega
- Publishers: JP/EU: Sega; NA: Sega/Gremlin
- Designer: Steve Hanawa
- Programmer: Steve Hanawa
- Platforms: Arcade, ColecoVision, Intellivision
- Release: Arcade: JP: 18 October 1981; NA: January 1982; EU: 1982; ColecoVision: November 1982; Intellivision: January 1984
- Genre: Racing
- Mode: Single-player
- Arcade system: VCO Object

Turbo (Japanese: ターボ, Hepburn: Tābo) is a 1981 racing video game developed and published by Sega for arcades; in North America, it was distributed by Sega/Gremlin. Designed and coded by Steve Hanawa, the game received positive reviews upon release, with praise for its challenging and realistic gameplay, 2.5D color graphics with changing scenery, and cockpit sit-down arcade cabinet. It topped the monthly Play Meter arcade charts in North America and ranking highly on the Game Machine arcade charts in Japan.

The game was manufactured in three formats: standard upright, cabaret/mini, and a seated environmental/cockpit. All three versions have a steering wheel, a gearshift for low and high gears, and an accelerator pedal. The screen is a vertically oriented 20-inch raster display. In addition to the on-screen display, there is an LED panel to the left of the screen that displays the current player's score and the high score table. There are also lighted oil and temperature gauges on either side of the steering wheel. Turbo was ported to the Colecovision and Intellivision consoles.

== Gameplay ==
Turbo requires the player to navigate a road race through different urban and rural locations, through differing weather conditions, and during changing times of day. The cars in the game resemble Formula 1 race cars. In order to proceed, the player must pass and stay ahead of at least 30 competing cars before time expires. Some opponents drive predictably, while others swerve across the road suddenly.

Turbo was the first game in its genre to feature a third-person perspective, one year earlier than Namco's Pole Position. It was also the first game to use scaling sprites as well as pioneered the utilisation of day-night transitions and weather effects.

In the first round, the player has unlimited lives; collisions with other vehicles will return the player's car to the bottom of the current screen. In subsequent rounds, the player is limited to two lives (one on the screen playing and the other in reserve) and awarded an additional life (up to a total of four in reserve) for each completed round. In addition to competing racers, an ambulance occasionally comes along from behind and overtakes the player - they must be avoided, as contact with them will cause the player to lose a life; the game will be over when all player lives are gone in addition to the time expired before reaching 30 passed cars.

== Development ==
Turbo was designed and coded by Steve Hanawa. In an interview, Hanawa stated that despite its historical significance as a precedent-setting racing video game, he considers the process of creating it to have been his worst development experience at Sega. Development of Turbo required such a difficult and protracted schedule of coding and debugging that he was hospitalized for a month following its completion due to stress, exhaustion and a spontaneously collapsed lung.

== Ports ==
An Atari 2600 port by Coleco was in development and advertised by Coleco. It was never completed in part because lead programmer Michael Green was struck and seriously injured by a drunk driver while riding a bicycle. The prototype, estimated to be about 80% complete, was found by another Coleco programmer, Anthony Henderson, in his attic in 2006.

== Reception ==
Reception

Review scores
Publication	Score
AllGame	4/5 (ARC); 4/5 (CV); 3.5/5 (INTV)
Computer and Video Games	Positive (ARC)
Tilt	6/6 (CV)
Arcade Express	10/10 (CV)
Cash Box	Positive (ARC)
Electronic Fun with Computers & Games	A (CV)
Video	Positive (CV)
Video Games Player	A (CV)

Award
Publication	Award
4th Arcade Awards	Best Coin-Op Game Audio/Visual Effects

In the United States, Turbo was the top-grossing arcade game on the Play Meter arcade charts in May 1982, taking the top spot from Donkey Kong. In Japan, Game Machine listed Turbo as the 18th highest-grossing arcade video game of 1981 (tied with Defender and Galaxian), and then the 19th highest-grossing arcade video game of 1982. Game Machine later listed Turbo as the fifth top-grossing upright/cockpit arcade unit of May 1983.

The arcade game received highly positive reviews upon release. In January 1982, Cash Box magazine called it "a challenging and colorful" game while praising the "realistic, three dimensional, full color imagery which allows drivers to experience the sensation and thrill of being in the thick of grand prix action" as well as the "excellent sound systems". Daniel Cohen in his book Video Games called it a "brilliant" new driving game providing a "challenging and remarkably realistic" experience, with praise for the cockpit cabinet that replicates the sit-down feel and controls of a real car, and the graphics which has changing scenery including the day, night, city, highway, oceanside curve, tunnels, twisting roads, and icy roads. In June 1982, Computer and Video Games magazine praised the "realism, controls, marvellous graphical capabilities" and the "variety of backgrounds and racing conditions on the screen".

In early 1983, Turbo was reviewed by Video magazine in its "Arcade Alley" column where it was hailed as "the king of the video road". The ColecoVision version was praised for the effort that had gone into replicating the visuals of the original arcade version, with reviewers making special note of the varied, non-repetitive backgrounds that enticed players to play in order to see "never-before-seen play scenes". Reviewers also commented favorably on the realism-enhancing use of steering wheel, gas pedal, and gear shift peripherals. Arcade Express reviewed the ColecoVision version in January 1983 and scored it a perfect 10 out of 10, remarking that the "king of the coin-op driving games arrives in the home market". They stated that while it isn't "as graphically arresting as the" arcade version, it "comes reasonably close to matching the multi-scenario brilliance" and "the special control panel lifts this cartridge to greatness".

== Legacy ==
A Turbo board game was released by Milton Bradley in 1983.
