= Gremlin Industries =

American arcade game manufacturer

Sega Electronics, Inc.
- Logo as Sega/Gremlin, used from 1981 to 1982 (Note: Registered trademark in Japan owned by Sega Corporation as of February 2023)
- Formerly: Gremlin Industries, Inc. (1971–1982)
- Type: Division
- Industry: Video games
- Founded: February 3, 1971; 55 years ago
- Founder: Frank Fogleman; Carl Grindle
- Fate: Manufacturing division sold to Bally Manufacturing and merged into Bally/Midway, library absorbed into Sega. Active as a shell corporation
- Headquarters: San Diego, California
- Products: Arcade game
- Parent: Sega Enterprises Inc. (1978–1983)

Gremlin Industries was an American arcade game manufacturer active from 1970 to 1983, based in San Diego, California. It was acquired by Sega in 1978, and afterwards was known as Gremlin/Sega or Sega/Gremlin. Among Sega/Gremlin's most notable games are Blockade and Head On, as well as being the North American distributors for Frogger and Zaxxon. The company's name was subsequently changed to Sega Electronics in 1982, before its operations were closed in 1983.

Sega later released emulated and playable version of some of Sega/Gremlin games as vault material for the Sega Ages and Sega Genesis Collection series.

== History ==
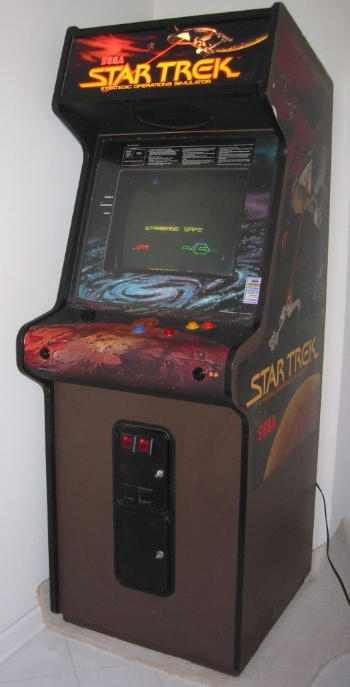
An arcade game of Star Trek made by Sega Electronics

Gremlin was founded in 1970 as a contract engineering firm by Harry Frank Fogleman and Carl E. Grindle. The company was intended to be named "Grindleman Industries" as a portmanteau of their last names, but an employee of the Delaware Secretary of State's office misheard the name over the phone, so the company was incorporated as Gremlin instead. In 1973, Gremlin became a manufacturer of coin-operated wall games with their first release Play Ball (1973). Gremlin joined the video game industry in 1976 by releasing its first video arcade game entitled Blockade (1976).

In 1977, Gremlin released a home computer under a subsidiary, Noval, Inc. Called the Noval 760, the computer was built into a wooden office desk, with the computer portion of the desk's top able to pivot in and out of view. It sold poorly and was discontinued in 1979.

In 1978, Gremlin was acquired by Sega Enterprises Inc. and their games acquired the label of Gremlin/Sega or Sega/Gremlin. Following the Sega purchase, Gremlin released games from both Sega and other Japanese companies. Among these video games were Namco's Gee Bee (1978), Nichibutsu's Moon Cresta (1980) and Super Moon Cresta (1980), Nintendo's Space Firebird (1980), and Konami's Frogger (1981).

In 1981, Gremlin leased the first building in Rancho Bernardo's Technology Park, which they moved into in 1982 as their main manufacturing facility. The estimated cost of the building was US$10 million and was the plant where games like Zaxxon (1982), Star Trek: Strategic Operations Simulator (1983), and Congo Bongo (1983) were manufactured.

In 1982, the name of the company was changed to Sega Electronics to better strengthen the Sega brand name in the United States. However, the company entered a rapid decline beginning in mid-1982, due to overproduction issues which ended the golden age of arcade video games.

In August 1983, the arcade manufacturing assets of the company were sold to Bally Manufacturing. Through the purchase, Bally/Midway acquired Sega's technology for laserdisc video games, principally Astron Belt as well as later games Galaxy Ranger (1983) and Albegas (1983). Bally gained the right of first refusal to publish arcade games by the Japanese Sega Enterprises, Ltd. in the United States for two years, and released games such as Up 'N Down, Future Spy, and Flicky.

The sale did not include other assets owned by Sega Enterprises Inc., such as their American research and development arms populated by former Sega Electronics staff. These development offered arcade games to Bally for publishing, though they were never released. Sega Enterprises Inc's home division continued releasing games including ports of arcade games licensed from Bally like Tapper (1983) and Spy Hunter (1983).

In 1984, Sega Enterprises, Ltd. was bought out in a management buyout by Sega executives David Rosen and Hayao Nakayama with backing from CSK Corporation. This included the rights to the Sega/Gremlin video game back catalog, which was later released in several game compilations. The wall game catalog was later marketed by a new firm in Las Vegas called Gremlin Industries, with the participation of several former Gremlin staff.

After the sale of arcade manufacturing assets, Sega Electronics became a shell company (holding only Gremlin brand trademarks in several countries). It was renamed to Ages Electronics in 1985 and later used as production company related to The Maury Povich Show. The corporate entity is currently part of CBS Media Ventures.

== Coin-operated games ==
All games developed by Gremlin Industries unless otherwise noted.

=== Video games ===
- Blockade (November 1976)
- CoMotion (March 1977)
- Hustle (May 1977)
- Depthcharge (September 1977)
- Safari (February 1978)
- Blasto (July 1978)
- Frogs (October 1978) The first game released under the Gremlin/Sega brand name.
- Fortress (1978)
- Gee Bee (January 1979) Developed by Namco.
- Super Space Attack (1979) Only distributed in Europe. Same as Space Attack, created by Gremlin.
- Head On (April 1979)
- Head On 2 (October 1979)
- Deep Scan (November 1979)
- Invinco (November 1979)
- Monaco GP (November 1979) Developed by Sega Enterprises Ltd.
- Moon Cresta (June 1980) Developed by Nichibutsu.
- Carnival (June 1980)
- Digger (September 1980)
- Space Tactics (1980) Developed by Sega Enterprises Ltd.
- Super Moon Cresta (1981)
- Astro Blaster (March 1981)
- Pulsar (March 1981)
- Space Fury (June 1981)
- Space Firebird (October 1981) Developed by Nintendo.
- Space Odyssey (August 1981) Developed by Sega Enterprises Ltd.
- Frogger (September 1981) Developed by Konami Industries, published by Sega Enterprises Ltd. in Japan.
- Eliminator (December 1981)
- Turbo (January 1982) Developed by Sega Enterprises Ltd.
- Zaxxon (April 1982) Developed by Ikegami Tsushinki, published by Sega Enterprises Ltd. in Japan.
- Zektor (August 1982)
- Tac/Scan (September 1982)
- Pengo (October 1982) Developed by Coreland Technologies, published by Sega Enterprises Ltd. in Japan.
- Star Trek: Strategic Operations Simulator (January 1983)
- Congo Bongo (March 1983) Developed by Ikegami Tsushinki, published by Sega Enterprises Ltd. in Japan.
- Championship Baseball (July 1983) Developed by Alpha Denshi, published by Sega Enterprises Ltd. in Japan.

=== Wall games ===
- Play Ball (1973)
- Skeet Shoot (1975)
- Fooswall (April 1976)
- Tenpin (August 1977)
- All Star (December 1978)

=== Unreleased games ===
- Shogun (1980) The American version of Sega Enterprises Ltd's Samurai (1980). Renamed to coincide with the television miniseries of the same name. Some English units of Samurai have surfaced bearing the Sega logo.
- Battle Star (1981) Color vector game developed by Gremlin, shown at Sega/Gremlin's Visions ’81 distributor meeting.
- Pig Newton (c. 1983) Originally intended to be published under Sega Electronics.
- Ixion (c. 1983) Action-puzzle game developed by Gremlin. An Atari 2600 port was also planned.
- Razzmatazz (c. 1983) Conceived as a sequel to Carnival.
- Astron Belt (1983) Originally intended to be published under Sega Electronics. After the sale of the company's assets, Bally published it under the Bally/Sega label.

== Ports ==
Sega released emulated and playable versions of some of the Sega/Gremlin arcade games as vault material in the Sega Ages compilation series for the Sega Saturn, PlayStation 2, Xbox 360, and PlayStation 3 and Sega Genesis Collection for the PlayStation 2 and PlayStation Portable.

Deep Scan was included as a bonus game in the Sega Saturn version of Die Hard Arcade.
