= Personal Computer Games =

Defunct British magazine

February 1985 issue

Personal Computer Games was a multi-format UK computer games magazine of the early/mid-1980s published by VNU.

== History ==
Personal Computer Games was launched in July 1983.

The magazine was part of VNU and had its headquarters in London. The second issue was published on 28 October 1983 with the magazine going monthly from February 1984.

Computer coverage at the time were mainly consisted of the Spectrum, C64 and the BBC Micro, although there were others featured such as Atari 8-bit, Electron, Vic 20 and the newly released Amstrad CPC.

The February 1985 issue was the last of the magazine. Chris Anderson and Bob Wade went on to launch the Commodore 64 magazine Zzap!64.

== Screen Test ==
One of the sections of the magazine was the 'Screen Test' pages where the latest games were reviewed. The PCG Panel, who voiced their opinions on the games reviews, consisted of the PCG staff plus several contributions from readers. The review was laid out with an explanation of the gameplay and then three opinions from the reviewers were given in boxouts at the end. PCG Ratings were out of ten, with a score giving to the graphics, sound, originality, lasting interest and the overall score.

== Game of the Month ==
The highest accolade awarded by Personal Computer Games was the "Game of the Month" (First introduced in issue 3), issue 1 did not have a Game of the Month. Issue 2's Game of the month was actually called the "Screen Star" award.

- Summer 1983(Issue 1) No Game of the month awarded.
- January 1984(Issue 2): Manic Miner (ZX Spectrum) - "Screen Star" award.
- February 1984(Issue 3): Revenge of the Mutant Camels (Commodore 64)
- March 1984(Issue 4): Scuba Dive (ZX Spectrum)
- April 1984 (Issue 5): Forbidden Forest (Commodore 64)
- May 1984(Issue 6): Jet Set Willy (ZX Spectrum)
- June 1984(Issue 7): Fortress (BBC Micro)
- July 1984(Issue 8): Loco (Commodore 64)
- August 1984(Issue 9): The Lords of Midnight (ZX Spectrum)
- September 1984(Issue 10): Quo Vadis (Commodore 64)
- October 1984(Issue 11): Ancipital (Commodore 64)
- November 1984(Issue 12): Pyjamarama (ZX Spectrum)
- December 1984(Issue 13): Boulder Dash (Commodore 64)
- January 1985(Issue 14): Underwurlde and Knight Lore (both ZX Spectrum)
- February 1985(Issue 15): Impossible Mission (Commodore 64)

== Cover mounts ==
In February 1984 PCG gave away a cover-mounted FlexiDisc containing game data that could be transferred to cassette. These included free programs for the Vic 20, Spectrum, BBC and Dragon 32/64 computers.

== See also ==
- Computer and Video Games (magazine)
