= Depthcharge =

1977 arcade video game

- Developer: Gremlin
- Publisher: Gremlin
- Platforms: Arcade, Noval 760
- Release: Arcade; September 1977; Noval 760; 1977
- Genre: Submarine simulator
- Mode: Single-player

Depthcharge is a black-and-white fixed shooter released in 1977 by Gremlin Industries as an arcade video game. The game shows a side view of a section of ocean with a destroyer on the surface and submarines passing beneath it. The player-controlled destroyer can be moved left and right and drop depth charges to destroy the submarines below.

== Gameplay ==
Up to four submarines may be present at any given time, each of which bears a score for destroying it that increases with its depth. Submarines release mines which the player-controlled ship must avoid by moving out of their path.
