= Zaxxon 3-D =

1987 video game

- Developer: Sega
- Publisher: Sega
- Series: Zaxxon
- Platform: Master System
- Release: JP: November 7, 1987; EU: November 1987; NA: March 1988
- Genre: Shoot 'em up
- Mode: Single-player

Zaxxon 3-D is a 1987 video game published by Sega for the Master System console. It is based on Sega's 1982 arcade game, Zaxxon.

== Gameplay ==
Zaxxon 3-D is a game in which the player navigates a Zaxxon craft through the nine levels built into the Vargan Space Fortress, using the SegaScope 3-D Glasses connected to the game system.

== Release ==
In October 1993, Atari Corporation filed a lawsuit against Sega for an alleged infringement of a patent originally created by Atari Corp. in the 1980s, and Atari sought a preliminary injunction to stop manufacturing, usage, and sales of hardware and software for the Sega Genesis and Game Gear. On September 28, 1994, both parties reached a settlement involving a cross-licensing agreement to publish up to five games each year across their systems until 2001. Zaxxon 3-D was one of the first five games approved from the deal by Sega in order to be converted for the Atari Jaguar, but it was never released.

== Reception ==
Bill Kunkel reviewed the game for Computer Gaming World, and stated that "words cannot adequately describe the sensations one experiences while playing this game. Though other arcade games have tried to duplicate an illusion of depth, they all comes short of the mark. Zaxxon 3-D serves up the real thing, in a format familiar to most gamers".
