= Pulsar (video game) =

1980 video game

- North American arcade flyer
- Developer: Gremlin/Sega
- Publishers: NA: Gremlin/Sega; JP: Sega
- Designers: Larry Clague; Mike Hendricks
- Programmers: Larry Clague; Mike Hendricks
- Platform: Arcade
- Release: JP: December 1980; NA: March 1981
- Genres: Maze, shooter
- Modes: Single-player, multiplayer

Pulsar is a 1980 maze shooter video game developed and published by Gremlin/Sega for arcades; in Japan, it was released by Gremlin's parent company Sega. The player controls a tank in a top-down view maze to fetch keys used to unlock the next level. It was designed and programmed by Larry Clague and Mike Hendricks.

== Gameplay ==
Player must move the tank through the maze to reach each colored key and transport them one by one to the matching colored lock. The color of the tank changes according to the color of the transported key. The structure of the maze is constantly changing, as well as force fields appearing and disappearing at regular intervals. There are three kinds of enemies that move in their own unique ways, shooting at the tank when it is in a direct line (horizontal or vertical). Tank fuel is limited, but can be replenished by destroying enemies. A tank is destroyed by being shot by an enemy, getting caught in the midst of a force field (running into it from the side is safe), and running out of fuel.

The fourth enemy is the titular Pulsar, a big red entity that adds a heartbeat sound to the stage music. The Pulsar never shoots at the player, and speeds up the first three times the player shoots it. Upon being shot a fourth time, it splits into six of the other enemy types.

Level is completed when all the locks are unlocked. The first level has two locks, with following levels adding one more to a maximum of five.
