= Astro Blaster =

1981 video game

- North American arcade flyer
- Developer: Gremlin/Sega
- Publishers: NA: Gremlin/Sega; JP: Sega
- Designers: Gary Shannon; Barbara Michalec
- Programmers: Gary Shannon; Barbara Michalec
- Platform: Arcade
- Release: NA/JP: March 1981
- Genre: Fixed shooter
- Modes: Single-player, multiplayer
- Arcade system: Sega G80

Astro Blaster is a 1981 fixed shooter video game developed and published by Gremlin/Sega for arcades; in Japan, it was released by Gremlin's parent company Sega. It was designed and programmed by Gary Shannon and Barbara Michalec. The game uses speech synthesis and during attract mode a voice says "Fighter pilots needed in sector wars...play Astro Blaster!" It is the first video game to have a copyright registered in Japan.

== Gameplay ==
In sector 1 with the fuel gauge almost full

The player controls a ship which can fire and move left or right. The player must continuously monitor the onscreen temperature and fuel gauges. If the ship's laser overheats, it is disabled until it cools; and if fuel is depleted, the game ends regardless of how many lives the player has left. The player must battle through waves of enemies, which attack with varied formations and flight patterns. When a wave is destroyed, a new one appears. The Warp function is usable once per sector or life, temporarily slowing all enemy vessels and making them easier to shoot.

At the end of each sector, the player flies through an asteroid belt and can get extra fuel by shooting fireballs. Then the mother ship is met, where the player docks and refuels for the next sector.

The player is rewarded for completing each of 25 undisclosed tasks or "secret bonuses", such as shooting all enemies in a specific order or shooting all enemies without missing.

== Reception ==
In his 1981 book How to Master the Video Games, Tom Hirschfeld stated that Astro Blaster challenges players with 29 different attacks across six sectors, with each sector becoming progressively more difficult.

== Legacy ==
The 1981 Apple II game Threshold was inspired by seeing an Astro Blaster machine.

An Astro Blaster cabinet can be seen in Shenmue.

Astro Blaster is one of five unlockable games in the PlayStation Portable version of Sega Genesis Collection.

The current world record high score was set in 1982 and is held by Gus Pappas with 299,100 points.
