= Threshold (1981 video game) =

1981 fixed shooter video game

- Box cover with a C64 sticker
- Developer: On-Line Systems
- Publishers: On-Line Systems; Tigervision (2600); France Image Logiciel (Thomson)
- Designer: Warren Schwader
- Programmers: Apple II; Warren Schwader; Ken Williams; Atari 8-bit Peter Oliphant
- Platforms: Apple II, Atari 8-bit, Atari 2600, VIC-20, Commodore 64, ColecoVision, Thomson
- Release: 1981: Apple, Atari, VIC; 1982: 2600; 1983: C64; 1984: ColecoVision, Thomson
- Genre: Fixed shooter

Threshold is a fixed shooter written by Warren Schwader and Ken Williams for the Apple II and published by On-Line Systems in 1981. Based on Sega's Astro Blaster arcade video game, Threshold introduces many enemy ship types and wave formations as the game progresses. Reviewers found the variety distinguished the game from similar shoot 'em ups.

Ports to other systems were released on ROM cartridge: Atari 8-bit computers and VIC-20 in 1981, Commodore 64 in 1983, and ColecoVision and Thomson computers in 1984. An Atari 2600 adaptation was published by Tigervision in 1982. It is unique in allowing the player's ship to move vertically.

== Gameplay ==
Threshold on Atari 2600

The player moves a spaceship, the Threshold, left and right along the botton of the screen and uses its laser weapon to destroy waves of aliens attacking from above. When a wave is eliminated, another appears. As in Astro Blaster, firing the laser increases its temperature, and it cools when not in use. If the temperature bar fills completely, then the weapon is disabled until it fully cools. Once per ship, pulling back on the joystick activates a "warp drive" that briefly slows the action.

In the Atari 2600 conversion, the ship can be freely moved in eight directions in the lower portion of the screen, but lacks the warp drive ability.

== Development ==
The game was inspired by Ken Williams playing an Astro Blaster arcade machine in a store and calling Warren Schwader. In an interview in Halcyon Days, Schwader said:

Instead of trying to duplicate the game in every detail, I set out to just take the concept and run with it–after first playing Astro Blaster for hours on end though. No matter how hard we tried, we never could get to the end of that game. There were always more new creatures to discover and that kept us coming back. We set out to provide the same experience for Threshold players.

It took two months to implement. Williams only worked on the project for two weeks of that time, writing the Apple II animation routines.

== Reception ==
On-Line Systems sold approximately 25,000 copies of Threshold.

Reviewing the Apple II original for Creative Computing, David Lubar wrote, "The animation in Threshold is superb", and he found the number of enemy types and waves to be a strong point. The magazine's Steve Williams said that the VIC-20 version "is a fine action game with a few interesting twists ... one of the best Galaxian derivatives available for the Vic". The Book of Atari Software 1983 gave the Atari 8-bit port a B rating: "It's the usual scenario, with this exception: the game offers unusual depth and variety." They found they sometimes mistook the stars in the animated background for enemy bullets. In Ahoy! magazine, R.J. Michaels led off his review with, "Only humor saves this game from being a run of the mill slide-and-shoot burn-the-alien-invaders game."

Appraising the Atari 8-bit computer version, Electronic Games noticed the Astro Blaster connection and wrote "The graphics in Threshold are tremendous." The reviewer disliked the loading that occurs every so often between levels and found the game overall too difficult.

=== Atari 2600 ===
Tigervision's Atari 2600 adaptation received a "Certificate of Merit" in the "Best Science Fiction/Fantasy Videogame" category of the 1983 Arcade Awards. JoyStik magazine gave the 2600 version four out of five stars and wrote: "Finally, a bottom-shoot space game where you can move vertically, as well as horizontally!"

== See also ==
- Sammy Lightfoot – 1983 game also developed by Warren Schwader
