= Fortress (1984 video game) =

- Cassette inlay cover
- Developer: Amcon
- Publisher: Pace Software
- Programmer: Mat Newman
- Platform: BBC Micro
- Release: 1984
- Genre: scrolling shooter
- Mode: Single-player

Fortress is an isometric scrolling shooter written by Mat Newman, developed by Amcon and released by Pace Software for the BBC Micro home computer in 1984. It is based on the 1982 Sega arcade game Zaxxon.

== Gameplay ==
Fortress is a scrolling shooter in which the player manoeuvres, a starfighter along an alley-like terrain in an isometric perspective, moving toward the top right of the screen. The player craft burns fuel rapidly (even more when flying at altitude) and fuel tanks need to be destroyed to replenish the on-board fuel tank. If the craft runs out of fuel, it crashes. The player must avoid enemy gun turrets, rocket pits, and fighters, as well as deal with additional problems of navigating over and through walls with force fields. The player has three lives. Completing the three stages leads to the enemy headquarters which needs to be destroyed. The game then starts over from the beginning.

== Development and release ==
Fortress was written by then-16 year-old Matthew (Mat) Newman of Amersham. He got his start using microcomputers with a Nascom. He purchased a BBC Micro in 1981, choosing it over the ZX Spectrum because of Planetoid, an Acornsoft clone of his favourite game Defender. He learned how to optimise the graphics and input of the machine by disassembling the code for Planetoid and studying a BBC Micro circuit diagram. He then wrote several commercial titles including Alien Swirl for Program Power, Space Hi-way for Amcon, and Ewgeebez for Software Projects. His experience essentially allotted him a "toolkit" for game creation.

Newman spent three months coding Fortress during the evenings, weekends, and holidays. He claimed to have never played the very similar Zaxxon, but rather was impressed by an illustration his friend drew of it and decided to try his hand at creating a similar game. Fortress was released by Pace Software in 1984 and appeared on Superior Software's Play It Again Sam 5 compilation in 1988.

== Reception ==
Both Personal Computer Games and Computer and Video Games featured Fortress as "Game of the Month" in their June 1984 issues. Chris Anderson of the former publication praised its isometric graphics as "superb" and how the game "combines 3D realism with hair-raising action." Aside from lacking originality and a software bug that causes crashes on some machines, he lauded it as "one of the most impressive games available on a home micro." The latter magazine positively matched the overall quality, graphics, and sound of Fortress with the original arcade version of Zaxxon. However, the reviewer found some difficulty using the keyboard for control and criticised the quick rate at which fuel runs out.

Tom Baines of Retro Gamer gave an equally favourable assessment much later on. He proclaimed, "From the variety in enemy types and the mix between dodging projectiles and dogfighting craft, to collecting enough fuel to progress and the game's smart use of height to traverse the environment – Fortress handles everything that Zaxxon does, and extremely well, in spite of the BBC Micro's low system power." He expressed minor complaints about the lack of a height indicator and a built-in multiplayer mode.
