= Dynamite Cop =

1998 video game

- Developer: Sega AM1
- Publisher: Sega
- Director: Makoto Uchida
- Producer: Rikiya Nakagawa
- Designer: Makoto Uchida
- Composer: Howard Drossin
- Platforms: Arcade, Dreamcast
- Release: Arcade: JP: July 1998; NA: 1999; Dreamcast: JP: May 27, 1999; EU: October 14, 1999; NA: November 2, 1999
- Genre: Beat 'em up
- Modes: Single-player, multiplayer
- Arcade system: Sega Model 2

Dynamite Cop, known in Japan as Dynamite Deka 2 (ダイナマイト刑事2, Dainamaito Deka Tsu), is a 1998 beat 'em up video game published by Sega and initially released in arcades on Sega Model 2 hardware. It is the sequel to the 1996 game Dynamite Deka, which was released outside Japan as Die Hard Arcade. The game was ported to the Dreamcast and released internationally in 1999, this time without the Die Hard license. A second sequel, Dynamite Deka EX: Asian Dynamite, was released only in arcades. In 2002, an Xbox version was announced by Sega and Cool Net Entertainment under the joint brand name "CoolCool", but since then there has been no information and the project has been abandoned. CoolCool itself has not released anything other than Rent a Hero No. 1 and appears to have disappeared.

== Gameplay ==
Dynamite Cop is a 3D beat 'em up for up to two players in which players play as either Bruno Delinger, Jean Ivy, or Eddie Brown and fight through levels on board a cruise ship and on a deserted island to save the President's daughter from a band of modern-day pirates led by Wolf "White Fang" Hongo, the main antagonist from the first game. The classic Sega arcade game Tranquilizer Gun (1980) is included as a bonus game on the Dreamcast version. Clearing all missions enables unlimited play of Tranquilizer Gun.

== Dynamite Deka EX ==
An arcade follow-up, Dynamite Deka EX: Asian Dynamite, was released in 2007. It uses the same level layouts from the original, redesigned into a Chinese-themed environment. New is a transformation mechanic, where picking up a transformation power-up will transform the character into a new form with a unique moveset. Each character has three unique transformations. Transformations include pro wrestler, martial artist, jiganshi, shrine maiden, and court jester.

In a 2018 interview, series creator Makoto Uchida stated new belt-scroll action games were difficult to greenlight at Sega because they were relatively expensive to develop and offered limited financial returns. Uchida said Sega Shanghai first developed the Sega Ages 2500 remake of the original Dynamite Deka at a lower cost than a Japanese domestic studio, and that its sales were used to show that the series still had an audience. The team modified Dynamite Deka' source code into a Chinese-themed internal presentation demo, changing the fifth stage's backgrounds and character graphics, and pitched the project on the basis that Sega Shanghai could produce it cheaply. According to Uchida, the project was ultimately approved by then-Sega president Hisao Oguchi on the condition that it not lose money.

== Appearances in other games ==
Its main character, Delinger, makes a cameo appearance in The House of the Dead 2 as a playable character via a special item obtainable in the original mode (present in home versions of The House of the Dead 2). Bruno Delinger also makes an appearance in Project X Zone as a solo unit character.

A chicken-leg from Golden Axe makes a cameo appearance on the Island stage.

== Reception ==
Reception

Aggregate score
Aggregator	Score
GameRankings	58%

Review scores
Publication	Score
AllGame	(ARC) 4.5/5 (DC) 2.5/5
CNET Gamecenter	6/10
Edge	5/10
Electronic Gaming Monthly	5.375/10 (Note: Four critics of Electronic Gaming Monthly gave the Dreamcast version each a score of 3.5/10, 7/10, 6.5/10, and 4.5/10.)
Famitsu	30/40
Game Informer	7/10
GameFan	(E.M.) 90% 81% (Note: In GameFan's viewpoint of the Dreamcast version's Japanese import, three critics gave it each a score of 82, 81, and 79.)
GameRevolution	D+
GameSpot	6.1/10
GameSpy	4/10
IGN	4.1/10
Next Generation	3/5
The Cincinnati Enquirer	1/4

The Dreamcast version received "mixed" reviews according to the review aggregation website GameRankings. Jeff Chen of NextGen called the game's Japanese import "An entertaining, if somewhat last-generation-looking, game." In Japan, Famitsu gave it a score of 30 out of 40.

Also in Japan, Game Machine listed the arcade version in their August 1, 1998 issue as the fourth most-successful arcade game of the month.

Scary Larry of GamePro said of the Dreamcast version in one review, "Unfortunately, all the heart-stopping action-movie chop-sockie comes to an abrupt end. The game is extremely short, and even a mediocre player can get through in less than an hour. Even with the multiple paths, the game has to rely on gimmicky diversions like an art gallery or bonus games to extend its life. A weekend rental? Perfect for you weekend warriors." (Note: GamePro gave the Dreamcast version 4.5/5 for graphics, two 4/5 scores for sound and fun factor, and a perfect 5 for control in one review.) In another review, Mike "Major Mike" Weigand said, "If you're looking for an action game where brainpower takes a backseat to brute force, then walk the Dynamite Cop beat. Others will be satisfied with a rental." (Note: GamePro gave the Dreamcast version three 4/5 scores for graphics, control, and fun factor, and 3/5 for sound in another review.)
