= Eliminator (1981 video game) =

1981 video game

- North American arcade flyer
- Developer: Sega/Gremlin
- Publishers: NA: Sega/Gremlin; JP: Sega
- Designer: Lane Hauck
- Platform: Arcade
- Release: NA: December 1981; JP: January 1982
- Genre: Multidirectional shooter
- Mode: Multiplayer
- Arcade system: G80

Eliminator is a 1981 multidirectional shooter video game developed and published by Sega/Gremlin for arcades; in Japan, it was distributed by Sega/Gremlin's parent company Sega. Similar to the monochrome Star Castle, it uses color vector graphics and allows both cooperative and competitive multiplayer gameplay, making it the only four-player vector game ever made. The game was a major technological step forward for Sega/Gremlin, since it added colour and voice synthesis to the gameplay in a way that enticed gamers. It motivated the company to continue the development of its colour vector graphics hardware.

== Gameplay ==
Players pilot a space ship around the playfield (space) and must destroy alien drones. The ultimate goal is to evade and destroy the Eliminator, a huge asteroid base. The players fire causes any enemy that is struck (with the exception of the Eliminator itself) to rebound and careen off in another direction. With a little skill, shots can propel the enemy into the Eliminator thus destroying them. There is only one way to destroy the Eliminator, fire a cannon blast down the trench into its center. This can be done directly or via a ricochet. Failure to destroy the Eliminator after a preset time causes the center to activate a drone that flies out of the Eliminator to shoot down the player with a destructive energy blast. The playfield becomes enclosed in an invisible barrier that bounces shots and ships off it, thus increasing the chances of death. Once the Eliminator is destroyed, the game restarts with a tougher set of enemies. The four player version allowed four players to simultaneously make attack runs on the Eliminator while trying to evade or destroy various other opponents. In four player mode, players must also dodge other player's ships.

== Reception ==
Michael Blanchet's 1982 book How to Beat the Video Games praised Eliminator as offering "the best two-player action I've seen in a long time".

== Legacy ==
The game is included as an unlockable game in the PSP version of Sega Genesis Collection.
