= Die Hard Arcade =

1996 video game

- North American Saturn box art by Mick McGinty
- Developers: Sega AM1; Sega Technical Institute
- Publisher: Sega
- Director: Makoto Uchida
- Producers: Roger Hector; Rikiya Nakagawa; Makoto Uchida
- Designer: Makoto Uchida
- Programmer: Hiroshi Ando
- Artists: Kunitake Aoki; Tatsuto Kumada
- Composer: Howard Drossin
- Platforms: Arcade, Sega Saturn, PlayStation 2, PlayStation Network
- Release: July 1996: Arcade; JP: July 1996; NA: August 1996; EU: September 1996 Saturn; JP: January 24, 1997; PAL: February 24, 1997; NA: March 18, 1997 PlayStation 2; JP: April 27, 2006 PlayStation Network; JP: August 22, 2012
- Genre: Beat 'em up
- Modes: Single-player, multiplayer
- Arcade system: ST-V

Die Hard Arcade, known as Dynamite Deka (ダイナマイト刑事, Dainamaito Deka; lit. Dynamite Detective) in Japan, is a 1996 beat 'em up video game developed and published by Sega for arcades. It was the first game in its genre to use texture-mapped 3D polygon graphics, and used a sophisticated move set by contemporary beat 'em up standards, often being likened to a fighting game in this respect. It also features quick time events, the ability to combine items to make more powerful weapons, and in two-player mode the ability to perform combined special moves and combos.

The game was published in cooperation with Fox Interactive and was a licensed product based on the Die Hard movie franchise. Because Sega did not hold the Japanese video game rights to the franchise, the game was stripped of the Die Hard license in Japan and published as an original property.

Similarly to hit action films of the time, Die Hard Arcade is dominated by over-the-top, largely gore-free violence which is played for comedic effect. Released in 1996 for arcades, the game was ported to the Sega Saturn in 1997 and the PlayStation 2 (Japan only) in the Sega Ages line in 2006. A sequel, Dynamite Cop, was released for arcades and Dreamcast in 1998 without the Die Hard license.

== Gameplay ==
Die Hard Arcade is a beat 'em up for one or two players, who play as either John McClane or Kris Thompsen (Bruno Delinger and Cindy Holiday in the Japanese version). Players fight their way through waves of enemies, using their fists, feet, and a variety of weapons that can be collected from enemies or the environment, from household items such as brooms and pepper shakers to high-damage missile launchers, submachine guns and anti-tank rifles. Items can be combined to make more powerful weapons, such as combining a spray and a lighter to make a flamethrower. Most weapons are automatically lost at the end of each action scene, but hand guns can be retained so long as they have ammunition remaining. The typical level structure is a number of minions the player must defeat in many rooms, followed by a boss. Quick Time Events are interspersed between many of the scenes. Failing a Quick Time Event results in either a loss of health, as is usual for QTEs, or an additional action scene which the players otherwise would not have to complete. Cut scenes are interspersed into the action.

The action is divided into three types of sequences: regular combat scenes, timed event scenes and polygonal story interludes. During event scenes, players must respond to on-screen prompts within a time limit, with success or failure potentially affecting the encounters that follow. In two-player cooperative mode, both players can work together with combined special moves and combos.

The Saturn version also includes a port of Sega's 1979 arcade game Deep Scan. Players can earn additional credits for Die Hard Arcade by achieving high scores in the bonus game.

== Plot ==
In the English version, John McClane and Kris Thompsen (Bruno Delinger and Cindy Holiday) try to save the President's daughter, Caroline Powell, from terrorists. There are a number of bosses in the game, including a biker called Hog, a Mexican wrestler named Jocko, the twin team of Mr. Oishi (a sumo wrestler) and Mr. Tubbs (an army general), a nameless muscle-bound fire chief armed with tiny grenades, and two pairs of laser-shooting Spiderbots. The final boss, of which all the others are henchmen, is known as Wolf "White Fang" Hongo. At the end of the game, if both players are still alive, the two players will fight each other on the rooftop of the skyscraper to gain the sole appreciation of the President's daughter (similar to the ending of Double Dragon).

== Development ==
Die Hard Arcade originated as a means for Sega to use existing resources: Sega had produced an excess inventory of ST-V arcade boards, and had acquired the Die Hard license but as yet had no Die Hard games in development. The game was created by Sega AM1 and the US-based Sega Technical Institute (STI), with all work on the game taking place at STI's facilities. Sega AM1 provided the engineering, design, and art, while STI provided art, design and animation. Die Hard Arcade was STI's only coin-op game, their only commercially released Saturn game following the cancellation of Sonic X-treme, and their final game developed before the studio was dissolved. Previews reveal that up until shortly before the game's arcade release, the gameplay was strictly two dimensional, with characters only able to move along a single plane. The game was developed simultaneously for the ST-V Titan arcade system and Sega Saturn, but the home version was released later.

In an August 1996 interview, Sega AM1 programmer Susumu Hirai explained that the developers sought to modernise traditional side-scrolling beat 'em ups by giving them a cinematic presentation. The team aimed to produce graphics comparable to Sega's Model 2 arcade hardware on the ST-V system, using polygonal characters and dynamic camera work to enhance the action and storytelling. Hirai described the American development team as leading the project, with AM1's Japanese staff providing support.

Director Makoto Uchida stated that he had relocated to the United States in February 1995 to work on the game, which took approximately a year and a half to develop. He wanted to eliminate the lengthy periods of walking between encounters found in earlier beat 'em ups, replacing them with cinematic sequences that maintained the pace of the action. Uchida also explained that 20th Century Fox had requested changes to the Western version to connect it more closely to the Die Hard films, including alterations to the characters and setting, while leaving the underlying gameplay largely unchanged.

The Japanese version of Die Hard Arcade, Dynamite Deka, was followed by a sequel titled Dynamite Deka 2 for the arcade and Dreamcast. The sequel was released internationally as Dynamite Cop. In 2007, a remake of the second game was released in arcades (on NAOMI) under the name Dynamite Deka EX in Japan and Asian Dynamite in Europe and the USA. Because the character is based on John McClane, Bruno's likeness is modeled after Bruce Willis.

In a 1998 interview, the game’s director Makoto Uchida noted that he is “personally a huge fan of Die Hard, and really wanted to make a Die Hard-esque game for a long time.”

== Reception ==
Reception

Review scores
Publication	Score
Computer and Video Games	Positive (ARC)
Electronic Gaming Monthly	7.375/10 (SAT)
Famitsu	8/10, 5/10, 7/10, 8/10 (SAT)
GameSpot	7.1/10 (SAT)
Next Generation	3/5 (ARC); 4/5 (SAT)
Sega Saturn Magazine	80% (SAT)

Die Hard Arcade achieved a certain degree of success upon release. In Japan, Game Machine listed Die Hard Arcade on their August 15, 1996 issue as being the second most-successful arcade game of the month. Computer and Video Games magazine gave the arcade game a positive review, comparing it favorably with the Streets of Rage series and comparing the moves and combos to the fighting game Virtua Fighter 2 (1994). Reviewing the arcade version, a Next Generation critic said Die Hard Arcade "breathes life into a dead-end genre", as the fighting moves are effective and far more abundant than in previous beat 'em ups, even discounting the acquirable weapons. He also found the graphics "lively", but criticized that it is often difficult to line up attacks with opponents, and the action is sometimes glitchy or sluggish. It was Sega's most successful US-produced arcade game up to that time.

Reviews for the Saturn port applauded its flawless conversion of the arcade version, variety of moves and combos, and selection of satisfying-to-use weapons, while criticizing the low longevity stemming from its short length, low difficulty, and limited replay value. Most critics asserted that even mildly-skilled players would beat the game within an hour, even without using the extra credits that can be earned by playing Deep Scan. Glenn Rubenstein of GameSpot disputed this, saying that most players would need credits from Deep Scan to have a reasonable chance of beating the game. Paul Glancey of Sega Saturn Magazine was particularly enthusiastic about the weapons, commenting that "there's not much to beat the thrill of smacking a terrorist right in his low brow with an antique grandfather clock." However, he stated that the game overall was "a fun fighting game that's especially suited for novice players, but it's too short lived for more experienced beat 'em up fans." Sushi-X of Electronic Gaming Monthly was also less than impressed, concluding, "Take away the humor, decent graphics and simple control, and you've got a bust." His three co-reviewers were more positive, with Crispin Boyer in particular calling the game "the slickest rip-off of Final Fight I've ever seen." GamePro's The Rookie made little of Die Hard Arcade's low longevity, deeming the game a welcome offering to enthusiasts of back-to-basics beat 'em up gameplay. A Next Generation critic noted the longevity as a major issue but likewise gave a firmly positive assessment: "Die Hard Arcade is designed for pure and simple action, and it delivers." Rubenstein similarly described it as "simple, violent, and easy. Basically, it's a blast."

GamesRadar ranked it number 25 on the list of the best Sega Saturn games, claiming that the "wide array of firearms and melee weapons helped amp up the arcade-style action."

== Legacy ==
Die Hard Arcade has been recognized as an important title in the transition of the beat 'em up genre to three-dimensional graphics. Guinness World Records identifies it as the first scrolling beat 'em up to use texture-mapped polygonal graphics. In a 2024 history of the genre, Den of Geek highlighted the game as a successful early attempt to adapt traditional beat 'em up gameplay to 3D at a time when many similar transitions sacrificed gameplay or multiplayer elements.
