= Blasto (arcade game) =

1978 video game

- Arcade flyer
- Developer(s): Gremlin Industries
- Publisher(s): Gremlin Industries
- Designer(s): Lane Hauck
- Platform(s): Arcade, TI-99/4A
- Release: Arcade; 1978; TI-99/4A; Early 1981
- Genre(s): Action, puzzle
- Mode(s): Single-player, multiplayer

Blasto is a 1978 action video game developed and published by Gremlin Industries for arcades. The player controls a spaceship and must maneuver it through a mine field. The player tries to beat the clock to destroy all the mines.

Bert Ankrom set the arcade world record on September 8, 2002, with a verified score of 8,730 points.

A port for the TI-99/4A home computer was later released by Milton Bradley in early 1981.
