= Star Blazer (1983 LaserDisc game) =

1983 LaserDisc arcade game

- Developer: Sega
- Publishers: Sega (Japan); Bally Midway (North America)
- Platform: Arcade
- Release: 1983
- Genre: Rail shooter
- Mode: Single-player
- Arcade system: Sega LaserDisc hardware

Star Blazer (Japanese: スター・ブレイザー), released in North America as Galaxy Ranger, is a LaserDisc arcade game developed by Sega and released in 1983. The game was published by Sega in Japan and by Bally Midway in North America as part of the companies' arcade distribution partnership. It was one of several LaserDisc-based arcade games released during the early 1980s and was a follow-up to Sega's earlier LaserDisc title Astron Belt.

Like Astron Belt, Star Blazer combined pre-recorded LaserDisc video footage with real-time computer-generated graphics, allowing players to engage enemy spacecraft against animated backgrounds that exceeded the graphical capabilities of contemporary arcade hardware.

== Gameplay ==
Star Blazer is a science-fiction rail shooter in which the player pilots a starfighter through a series of predetermined flight sequences. Using a joystick and fire button, players maneuver within the screen while shooting enemy spacecraft, defensive installations, and other threats superimposed over LaserDisc-generated backgrounds.

The game takes players across a variety of alien environments, including deserts, tunnels, and futuristic cities. Gameplay culminates in confrontations with large enemy battle cruisers. Enemy spacecraft attack throughout each stage, requiring players to destroy targets while avoiding incoming fire.

Unlike many contemporary arcade shooters that relied entirely on computer-generated graphics, Star Blazer used a LaserDisc to display cinematic animated sequences beneath the interactive game elements. The hardware overlaid score displays, player shots, enemy targets, and collision detection onto the video footage.

== Development and release ==
Star Blazer was developed for Sega's LaserDisc arcade platform, utilizing the same basic hardware architecture as Astron Belt. The game was released in Japan as Star Blazer and in North America as Galaxy Ranger by Bally Midway. Galaxy Ranger ran on the same Sega LaserDisc hardware requiring only different ROMs and LaserDisc content.

North American promotional materials advertised the game as a dedicated cabinet as well as a conversion kit for existing Astron Belt machines.

== Reception ==
Contemporary coverage of Star Blazer was limited compared to more commercially successful LaserDisc arcade games such as Dragon's Lair and Astron Belt. System 16 documents reviews appearing in British publications including Computer and Video Games and Your Sinclair during the 1980s.

Retrospective coverage has generally focused on the game's place within Sega's early LaserDisc lineup. Arcade preservation sources have highlighted its varied environments, cinematic presentation, and use of animated video backgrounds integrated with traditional arcade shooter gameplay.

== Legacy ==
Although overshadowed by better-known LaserDisc arcade releases, Star Blazer remains notable as one of Sega's early experiments with full-motion video technology. The game has been preserved through arcade collecting and emulation projects and is frequently referenced in histories of LaserDisc arcade gaming.

== See also ==
- List of LaserDisc games
