= Tac/Scan =

1982 video game

- North American arcade flyer
- Developer(s): Sega Electronics
- Publisher(s): Sega
- Designer(s): Michael Hendricks; Brian Millar
- Platform(s): Arcade, Atari 2600
- Release: Arcade: NA: September 1982; JP: November 1982; 2600: NA: March 1983
- Genre(s): Space combat simulator
- Mode(s): Single-player

Tac/Scan (夕ック/スキャン) is a 1982 space combat simulator video game developed by Sega Electronics and published by Sega for arcades. An Atari 2600 version was released in 1983.

The game uses 3D vector graphics that switch between overhead and third-person perspectives. The player commands seven units in squadron formation through waves of attacking enemies; the player can gain reserve units, while being able to command the units to perform various actions, including firing at enemies, getting into formation, or a "tac" maneuver.

Tac/Scan is an unlockable game in the PlayStation 2 version of Sega Genesis Collection.

== Gameplay ==
Title screen

The game starts with seven individual ships in play. The ships can be lost in any of the three stages by hitting a tunnel, getting shot, or colliding with an enemy, the laser-firing Ahmins composing the superfleet from the planet of Ahm. The player is able to "collect" and earn the ships back as the game progresses. The squadron can drop down to one ship in the game, but still have four "back-up" ships. If the final ship in play is lost, however, the game is over (even if the player has unused "back-up" ships). This is different from other games that give the player ships sequentially.

In the first stage, the player pilots their ships through waves of attacking enemies. The player can either fire upon them, or "tac" their ships around them. The second stage is much like the first, except that it is from a 3-D third-person perspective from behind the player's ships. In the third stage, the player pilots their ships down a space warp tunnel, and will lose any ships that touch the side of the tunnel.

== Reception ==
In Japan, Game Machine listed Tac/Scan as the 22nd most successful table arcade unit of June 1983.
