= Ecstatica II =

1997 video game

- North American box art
- Developer: Andrew Spencer Studios
- Publisher: Psygnosis
- Platforms: MS-DOS, Windows
- Release: NA: 10 June 1997; EU: 1997
- Genre: Action-adventure
- Mode: Single player

Ecstatica II is an action-adventure game developed by Andrew Spencer Studios and published in 1997 by Psygnosis for MS-DOS and Windows. It is a sequel to Ecstatica.

== Gameplay ==
The gameplay is similar to Ecstatica, with improvements to the game's controls and more detailed ellipsoid graphics. The play area is much larger than the first game and offers free-roaming gameplay involving exploration of the castle. Enemies respawn after a certain period. The protagonist can pick up various swords with different strength and reach. He can also use magic attacks against his foes by either equipping a staff or learning spells from scrolls.

== Plot ==
The story starts right where the first game ended, when the Nameless Traveller, who turns out to be a Prince in an unnamed country, rescued Ecstatica from the doomed town of Tirich. The Prince returns to his kingdom with Ecstatica, planning to get married, only to find out that his castle has been savagely pillaged and plundered and his people have been brutally massacred by demons, goblins, and human barbarians. Just as they arrive at the drawbridge, a winged demon flies by and kidnaps Ecstatica while the Prince is knocked unconscious by another winged demon, only to wake up and realize he has been put into the castle's pillory. However, the Prince is revitalized and set free by a mysterious female voice that urges him to defeat the evil Archmage to restore the balance of the world by restoring the 7 Elder sign and at the same time to rescue his beloved Ecstatica from the Archmage before she is used as a sacrifice.

== Development ==
Ecstatica II uses ellipsoid graphics in order to give polygonal objects smooth edges instead of sharp ones. Andrew Spencer explained how the programming for the ellipsoid graphics works: "All the objects are algorithmic, which means there's a little bit of programming in each one. Trees and plants, for example, are fractals with a bit of randomness built in and a few rules to follow. Ferns are told to get lighter toward the end; plants are told to develop stalks and then sprout into flowers. In a sense, the program, written in C, grows the object rather than builds it." The enemies were designed so that no two individuals would have exactly the same stats.

The game was originally set to release in March 1997.

== Reception ==
Reception

Review scores
Publication	Score
GameSpot	7.9/10
Hyper	87%
Next Generation	4/5
PC PowerPlay	86%

A reviewer for Next Generation praised the high quality of the ellipsoid graphics engine, the smoothness of the character animations, and the wide variety of moves available to the player character, but criticized the use of prerendered scenery, noting that it results in load times as the character moves between camera shots and often obscures items, enemies, and traps. Tim Soete of GameSpot likewise found the prerendered scenery often makes the game confusing and frustrating, and that the effective use of ellipsoids and wide variety of combat moves are strong points. He also praised the massive length of the game. He concluded, "What's important is that, because it's so graphically rich and varied in its gameplay, Ecstatica II is a game you can really get lost in." GamePro's Art Angel assessed that "With much improved graphics, an expanded map, increased character movements, and a larger variety of enemies, Ecstatica II has surpassed its predecessor in almost every way." However, he found the controls overly complex and too slow to respond in the heat of battle. He gave the game a 4.5 out of 5 for graphics, particularly noting the "beautifully rendered" ellipsoids and strong use of color, and a 4.0 out of 5 for sound, control, and fun factor.
