= Ecstatica =

1994 video game

Ečstatica
- Cover art by Carl Critchlow
- Developer: Andrew Spencer Studios
- Publisher: Psygnosis
- Director: Andrew Spencer
- Producer: Greg Duddle
- Designer: Andrew Spencer
- Programmer: Andrew Spencer
- Writer: Alain Maindron
- Platforms: MS-DOS, Windows
- Release: EU: 1994; NA: 1997
- Genre: Survival horror
- Mode: Single-player

Ečstatica is a 1994 survival horror game developed by British team Andrew Spencer Studios and released by Psygnosis for MS-DOS and Windows. Set in an alternate fantasy 10th century, it follows a traveler who comes across a village that has been taken over by a demonic curse. The game notably used ellipsoid 3D computer graphics and was well-received. It was followed by a sequel, Ecstatica II, in 1997. In 2026, a port of the game was released on Steam.

== Gameplay ==
The gameplay is from a third-person perspective with viewing angles changing automatically. The player has the option of choosing either a male or female character. The player has the ability to sneak, walk or run in different directions. The character may carry two items, one with each hand. Throughout the game, the character is under constant threat from demons. They must fight the demons using strikes and dodges, with combat vaguely resembling a fighting game. In addition to action and adventure elements, the game also contains moments of black and crude humor.

== Plot ==
In Northern Europe in 928 AD, a traveler comes upon the town of Tirich hoping to find food and shelter. However, the town has been invaded by demons—notably a werewolf, trolls, and two minotaurs, among others—with its inhabitants slaughtered. The traveler must lift the curse from the town by freeing the young sorceress Ečstatica from her possession.

== Development ==
Initially developer Andrew Spencer Studios consisted of just Andrew Spencer himself, who spent years single-handedly creating the game engine used by Ecstatica. The team expanded to two people for the remainder of development: Spencer and film animation expert Alain Maindron.

The game uses a unique type of ellipsoid graphics to display characters. Each character is made of ellipsoids approximating different parts of the body. Some elements of the environments, such as the trees and the shrubs, are also constructed in ellipsoids. This gave the game a unique aesthetic, as it looked much less angular than other more conventional polygon-based game graphics at the time. Andrew Spencer explained, "The main advantage is the organic-looking characters. Triangles tend to make hard, robotic-looking figures, whereas ellipsoids can be used to create more rounded, human alternatives. Ellipsoids can also be more efficient because you can make a much better looking character out of fewer shapes."

== Reception ==
Reception

Review scores
Publication	Score
AllGame	3/5
Computer Gaming World	4/5
Edge	8/10

James V. Trunzo reviewed Ecstatica in White Wolf Inphobia #55 (May, 1995), rating it a 2 out of 5 and stated that "The world of Ecstatica is indeed surrealistic. That much has been achieved. And as noted, there's a very cool story lurking somewhere behind the unplayable interface, but I'm giving up on finishing it."

Computer Gaming World nominated Ecstatica as its 1994 "Adventure of the Year", although it lost to Relentless: Twinsen's Adventure. The editors wrote of Ecstatica, "The offbeat characters and unusual storyline mesh with the racy humor to form an adventure of a different feather." In 1996, GamesMaster ranked the game 69th on their "Top 100 Games of All Time."
