= Zektor =

1982 video game

- North American arcade flyer
- Developer: Sega Electronics
- Publisher: Sega
- Platform: Arcade
- Release: NA: August 1982
- Genre: Multidirectional shooter
- Modes: Single-player, multiplayer
- Arcade system: G80

Zektor is a 1982 multidirectional shooter color vector video game developed by Sega Electronics and published by Sega for arcades. It challenges the player to pilot a space ship in a quest to recapture eight cities that have been captured by alien robots. The robots' dialogue is spoken through speech synthesis.

== Gameplay ==
There are eight cities to reclaim in Zektor. The robots personally name their conquered city in the level's opening challenge to the player.

The Defense grid is a zone outside the city where the player must take on dangerous Roboprobes that are highly maneuverable and fire "Zizzers" (energy blasts) at the player as well as moving Moboids that either destroy the player's ship on contact or deflect the player's ship in some preprogrammed manner. The defense grid lasts for three attack waves which must be outlasted to advance to the next challenge: the destruction of the Robot overlord that controls the city.

With the three attack waves of the Defense Grid overcome, the player gets to destroy the robot overlord and free the city. The Robot in question starts at the center of the screen behind three rotating barriers. Each barrier has a slot on one of its sides and when all three align they form a channel in which the player can fire through and thus hit and destroy the Robot head inside. To make things more challenging the Robot fires "Zizzers" constantly at the player and the Robot shrinks inside the barrier system so that only anything but a direct hit dead center will ensure success. Destroying the robot not only saves the city but awards the player with an extra ship. When the Robot shrinks completely from sight the round is over and the player is moved to the next city. Once the player reaches the eighth city this wave will repeat indefinitely.

== Legacy ==
Zektor is included as an unlockable game in the PlayStation 2 version of Sega Genesis Collection.
