= Zaxxon =

1981 video game

- North American arcade flyer
- Developers: Sega; Ikegami Tsushinki
- Publishers: JP/EU: Sega; NA: Sega/Gremlin
- Series: Zaxxon
- Platform: Arcade: ColecoVision, Atari 2600, Intellivision, Apple II, Atari 8-bit, IBM PC, TRS-80, TRS-80 Color Computer, Coleco Adam, Commodore 64, Atari 5200, SG-1000, MSX, ZX Spectrum
- Release: December 26, 1981: Arcade; JP: December 26, 1981 (Note: Limited release on December 26, 1981. Wide release in January 1982.); NA: April 1982; EU: July 1982 ColecoVision; NA: September 1982; EU: 1983 2600; April 1983 Intellivision; August 1983 Apple II, IBM PC, TRS-80; 1983 Atari 8-bit; NA: 1983; UK: 1984 Adam, C64; February 1984 5200; August 1984 SG-1000; JP: February 1985 MSX; JP/EU: 1985 ZX Spectrum; UK: 1985
- Genre: Scrolling shooter
- Modes: Single-player, multiplayer
- Arcade system: Sega Zaxxon

Zaxxon (Note: Japanese: ザクソン, Hepburn: Zakuson) is a 1981 scrolling shooter developed and published by Sega as an arcade video game. It was developed with assistance from Ikegami Tsushinki, the same team who had programmed Nintendo's Donkey Kong the same year. The player pilots a ship through two heavily defended space fortresses, and the outer space areas between them, to confront the Zaxxon robot at the end of the second fortress.

Zaxxon was one of the first games to employ axonometric projection, which lent its name to the game. The type of axonometric projection is isometric projection: this effect simulates three dimensions from a third-person viewpoint. It was also the first arcade game to be advertised on television, with a commercial produced by Paramount Pictures for $150,000. The game was a critical and commercial success upon release, becoming one of the top five highest-grossing arcade games of 1982 in the United States.

Sega released a modified version as Super Zaxxon the same year and the Zaxxon-like shooter Future Spy in 1984.

== Gameplay ==
The Zaxxon robot at the end of the second fortress

The objective of the game is to hit as many targets as possible without being shot down or running out of fuel, which can be replenished by blowing up fuel tanks (300 points). There are two fortresses to fly through, with an outer space segment between them. At the end of the second fortress is a boss in the form of the Zaxxon robot.

The player's ship casts a shadow to indicate its height. An altimeter is also displayed. In space, there is nothing for the ship to cast a shadow on. The walls at the entrance and exit of each fortress have openings, and the ship must be at the right altitude to pass through. Within each fortress are additional walls that the ship's shadow and altimeter aid in flying over successfully.

The game is controlled by a four-directional joystick. On arcade cabinets, this is an aircraft-type stick with a molded hand grip. Pushing forward makes the aircraft lower in altitude and pulling back makes it rise. The aircraft cannot move forward or backward; it flies at constant speed. As this sort of control and movement was not common in video games, the arcade cabinets have illustrations around the joystick to indicate the effect of each position on the aircraft.

== Ports ==
Between 1982 and 1985, Zaxxon conversion of Zaxxon were released for the Apple II, Atari 8-bit computers, Atari 2600, Atari 5200, MSX, ZX Spectrum, Commodore 64, Dragon 32, ColecoVision, Intellivision, IBM PC compatibles, SG-1000, TRS-80 Color Computer, and TRS-80. The Atari 2600 and Intellivision ports use a third-person, behind-the-ship perspective instead of the isometric graphics of the other versions.

In 2022, the game was re-released as a built-in game on the Sega Astro City Mini V.

== Reception ==
Reception

Review scores
Publication	Score			
Publication	Atari 2600	ColecoVision	PC	ZX
Computer and Video Games	35%	55%	39/40 (MSX)	
Arcade Express		9/10		
Computer Games				
Electronic Fun with Computers & Games		A		
Home Computing Weekly				4/5
K-Power			8/10 (TRS-80)	
Video Games Player		A	Positive (Atari 8-bit)	

=== Commercial ===
The arcade game was a major commercial success worldwide. In Japan, Game Machine magazine listed it as the 18th highest-grossing arcade game of 1981, despite having only a limited release towards the end of the year; it did not appear on the magazine's top 20 annual list for 1982. The magazine later listed the game as the eighth top-grossing table arcade cabinet of May 1983.

The arcade game was a bigger commercial hit in North America, where it reached the top of the monthly US RePlay arcade charts in June 1982. The Amusement & Music Operators Association (AMOA) later listed it among the top six highest-grossing arcade games of 1982 in the United States.

The ColecoVision version was also commercially successful, being Coleco's best-selling non-bundled cartridge for the console up until 1983. In June 1983, Electronic Games ranked the ColecoVision version of Zaxxon as the #3 “Most Popular Videogame Cartridge” in its monthly reader poll.

The home computer ports were commercially successful in North America and Europe. II Computing listed Zaxxon fourth on its list of top Apple II games as of late 1985, based on sales and market-share data. On home computers in the United States, Zaxxon received a "Gold Award" from the Software Publishers Association (SPA) in December 1987 for software sales above 100,000 units. U.S. Gold's home computer version of Zaxxon was ranked number two on the UK software sales chart in early 1985.

=== Reviews ===
The arcade game was well received upon release. David Cohen, in his book Video Games, praised the "incredible three-dimensional realism" in the graphics, which he considered the best in a video game to date, while describing the gameplay as "a mixture of driving and zap game." Computer and Video Games praised the game for being "at the frontier of a third dimension in arcade games" and for its "realistic" altitude-based gameplay for the time.

Video Games in 1983 called the ColecoVision version of Zaxxon a "coup for this new system". Video magazine also praised the ColecoVision version in its "Arcade Alley" column, describing it as "one of the most thrilling games available", and noting in passing that the only "serious criticism" of the arcade original was "many players felt they needed flying lessons to have even a ghost of a chance of performing well". K-Power rated the Color Computer version with 8 points out of 10. The magazine praised its "excellent three-dimensional graphics", and said "Zaxxon is a game that can't be praised enough".

Softline in 1983 called the Atari 8-bit version "a superb three-dimensional computer game ... Not since Choplifter has a game looked so impressive". The magazine also liked the graphics of the Apple II and TRS-80 versions despite those computers' hardware limitations, and predicted that Zaxxon would be a "long-lived bestseller". In 1984, the magazine's readers named the game the fifth most-popular Apple program, the worst Apple program, and third-worst Atari program of 1983. InfoWorld's Essential Guide to Atari Computers cited it as a good Atari arcade game, noting "its distinctive three-dimensional graphics".

=== Awards ===
At the 1982 Arkie Awards, the arcade game received a Certificate of Merit as runner-up for Best Science Fiction/Fantasy Coin-Op Game. At the 1983 Arcade Awards, the console cartridge conversion received a Certificate of Merit as runner-up for Videogame of the Year. At the 1984 Arkie Awards, the dedicated console version was awarded Stand-Alone Game of the Year, while the home computer conversion received a Certificate of Merit as runner-up for Computer Game of the Year. In January 1985, Electronic Games magazine included Zaxxon in its Hall of Fame. In 1995, Flux magazine ranked the arcade version 51st on its list of the "Top 100 Video Games".

== Legacy ==
=== Re-releases ===
Zaxxon is a bonus game in the Sega Genesis Collection for the PlayStation 2. It is also an unlockable arcade game in Sonic's Ultimate Genesis Collection for the Xbox 360 and PlayStation 3. The arcade version was released on the Wii Virtual Console in Japan on December 15, 2009, the PAL region on March 5, 2010, and North America on April 12, 2010. In 2022, the original arcade version was included as part of the Sega Astro City Mini V, a vertically oriented variant of the Sega Astro City mini console.

=== Sequels ===
An arcade sequel, Super Zaxxon, was released in November 1982. It has a different color scheme, the player's ship flies faster (making the game more difficult), the space segment is replaced with a tunnel, and the enemy at the end of the second fortress is a dragon. It did not do as well as the original. Super Zaxxon topped the US RePlay arcade chart for software conversion kits in July 1983. In 1984, Sega released Future Spy with a similar style.

In 1987, Zaxxon 3-D was released for the Master System. This console variation makes use of the 3-D glasses add-on. As with the Atari 2600 and Intellivision ports, it is forward-scrolling rather than isometric.

Zaxxon's Motherbase 2000 was released for the 32X in 1995. It is the first Zaxxon game with polygonal graphics. The game bore the Zaxxon brand only in the United States. It was released as Parasquad in Japan and Motherbase in Europe. US gaming critics generally found it was not similar enough to Zaxxon to justify the use of the brand.

Zaxxon Escape was released on October 4, 2012, for iOS and Android devices. It was criticized for having little resemblance to the original.

=== Clones ===
In 1984, a clone was released for the BBC Micro as Fortress. Zaksund was published for the TRS-80 Color Computer in 1983.

=== Popular culture ===
In 1982, Milton Bradley released a Zaxxon board game.

In 2012, Zaxxon was shown at "The Art of Video Games" exhibition at the Smithsonian.
