= Astron Belt =

1983 LaserDisc-based arcade game

- North American arcade flyer
- Developer: Sega
- Publishers: JP: Sega; EU: Taitel Electronics; NA: Bally Midway
- Platforms: Arcade, MSX
- Release: Arcade: JP: May 1983; EU: July 1983; NA: October 1983; MSX: JP: 1984
- Genres: Rail shooter, space combat
- Mode: Single-player
- Arcade system: Sega Laserdisc

Astron Belt (アストロンベルト) is a LaserDisc video game in the form of a third-person, space combat rail shooter, released in arcades in 1983 by Sega in Japan, and licensed to Bally Midway for release in North America. Developed in 1982, it was the first major arcade LaserDisc video game. The game combines full-motion video (FMV) footage from the LaserDisc with real-time 2D graphics. The arcade game was available in both upright and cockpit arcade cabinets, with the latter having illuminated buttons on the control panel, a larger 25-inch monitor (the upright used a standard 19-inch), and a force feedback vibrating seat.

The game was first unveiled at the 20th Amusement Machine Show, held in Tokyo during September 1982, and then at Chicago's Amusement & Music Operators Association (AMOA) show, held during November 18–20, 1982. This marked the beginning of LaserDisc fever in the video game industry, and released in Japan during early 1983, with Sega projecting to ship 10,000 cabinets that year. It was subsequently released in Europe, where it was the first LaserDisc game released in the region. However, Bally Midway delayed the game's release in the United States to fix several hardware and software bugs, by which time it had been beaten to public release by several LaserDisc games including Dragon's Lair.

The game was a commercial success in arcades, especially in Japan where it was the top-grossing upright/cockpit arcade game for four months. Critical reception was initially positive following its AMOA 1982 debut and then its European release, but was later mixed following its North American release as it drew unfavorable comparisons with other laserdisc games. Astron Belt was ported to the MSX home system in 1984 in Japan.

== Gameplay ==
The player controls a lone spacecraft on a mission to singlehandedly take down the entire enemy armada. Enemy fighters and ships shoot at the player, and there are mines and other objects that must be shot or avoided.

The game is divided into waves. At the end of each wave is a command ship that must be destroyed. In later waves the enemy fighters move and shoot more aggressively, and their shots are more accurate. Some waves take place in open space, while others require the player to battle enemies while flying through narrow trenches and tunnels. The player is on a timer at the beginning of the game, with an unlimited number of lives available. The length of the timer can be adjusted by the machine operator, but is normally 60 seconds. After the timer expires, the player is given a limited number of additional lives. When all of those lives are lost, the game ends.

The background videos used in the game are a mixture of original artwork and borrowed material. In addition to the scenes created specifically for the game, the designers also incorporated footage from three science fiction movies: Star Trek II: The Wrath of Khan, Battle Beyond the Stars, and Message from Space.

== Technical ==
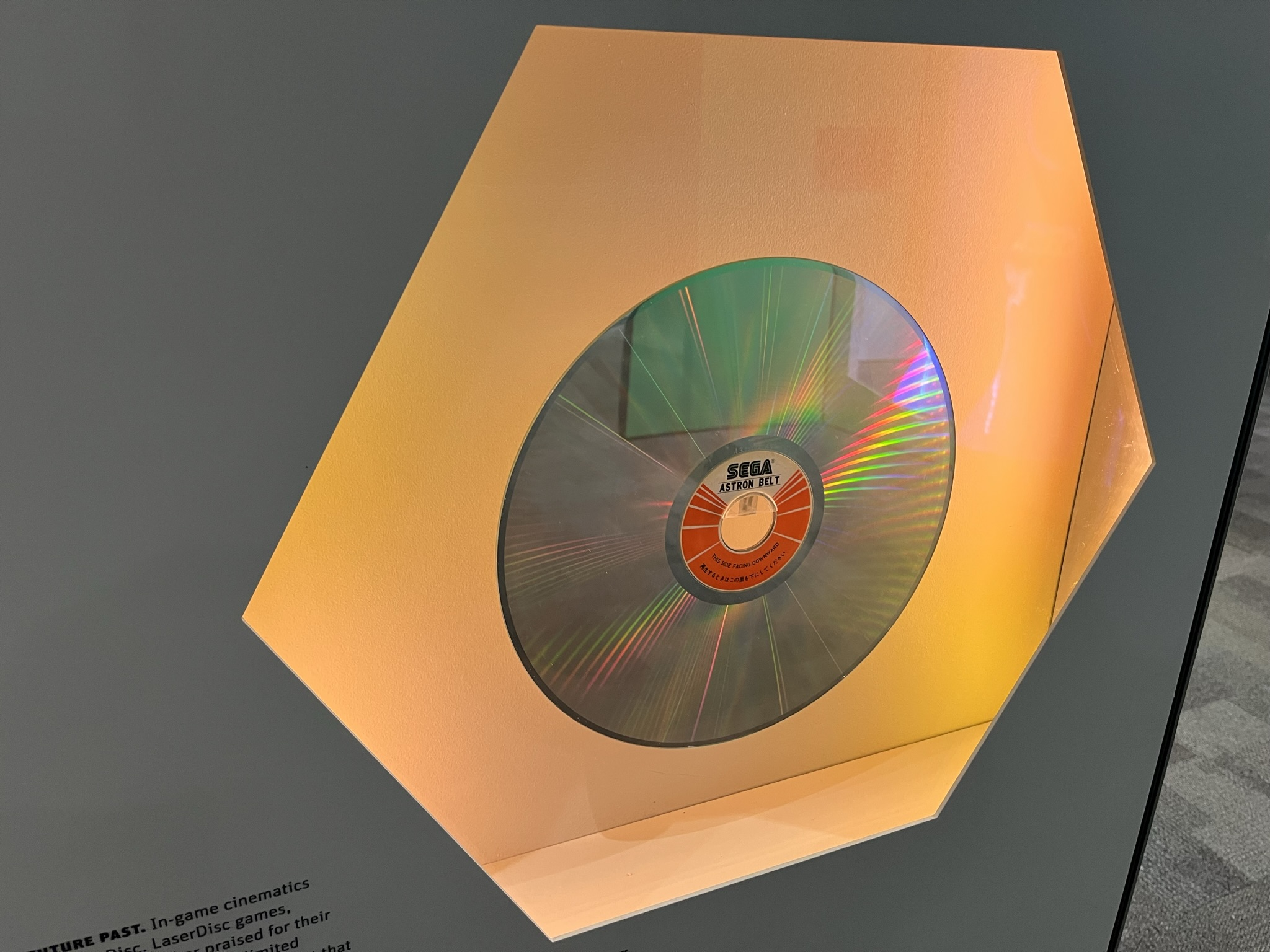
An Astron Belt laserdisc

Astron Belt initially used a Pioneer LaserDisc player. In total, it used one of four LaserDisc players, either a Pioneer LD-V1000 or LD-V1001, or a Hitachi VIP-9500SG or VIP-9550. Two different versions of the laser disc itself were also pressed, a single-sided version by Pioneer and a double-sided version by Sega. However, both discs have the same information and may be used in any of the four players.

Running on the Sega Laserdisc hardware, the game combines pre-rendered LaserDisc footage with a real-time 2D computer graphics plane. The real-time graphics plane generates sprite graphics similar to an earlier Sega title, Buck Rogers: Planet of Zoom (1982), and was overlaid by imitating a matting technique. As the CRT monitor scans horizontally across the screen, it is fed information from the LaserDisc up until the point where it is fed information from the computer graphics system, after which information coming from the LaserDisc stops, creating a black mask into which a sprite is inserted. It uses a collision detection system where both the LaserDisc and sprite planes can interact with each other. Each frame of the LaserDisc footage is coded with a hit detection spot stored in ROM memory. The Zilog Z80 CPU reads the number of the LaserDisc frame, and checks the LaserDisc hit spots with the shots fired by the player, and if the coordinates correspond, it instructs the LaserDisc player to display an explosion sequence. For sections where the player must navigate between walls, the walls in the LaserDisc footage are also coded and use collision detection.

== Reception ==
In Japan, Game Machine listed Astron Belt as the top-grossing upright/cockpit arcade cabinet for four months in 1983. In June 1983, it was the top upright/cockpit cabinet of the month. It remained at the top of the Game Machine upright/cockpit charts through October 1, 1983, before being dethroned by Namco's Pole Position on October 15, 1983. Astron Belt remained in the top ten through December 1983.

In the United States, Astron Belt topped the Play Meter LaserDisc arcade charts for street locations by August 1, 1984, while being in the top three for arcade locations. It remained among the top five LaserDisc arcade games for street locations and top ten for arcade locations through November 1984.

=== Reviews ===
Video Games gave the arcade game a highly positive review following its AMOA 1982 demonstration, calling it a "large screen science fiction space shooting game that's played against film footage of spaceships, planets and explosions!" They stated that, for "many players, this is the ultimate video game!" Computer and Video Games gave it a positive review upon its European release, calling it a pioneering game and praising the realistic visuals and audio, the continue feature, the futuristic cockpit cabinet, and the vibrating seat, but criticizing "a few rough edges" in the gameplay, the high price of £0.40 (equivalent to £1.36 in 2025) per play, and for sometimes vibrating "more than is comfortable." They concluded that "any arcade player who wants a future in gaming should try his hand at Astron Belt as soon as possible" but "it remains to be seen if Astron Belt is the shape of games to come."

Upon its North American release, the game received mixed reviews from Computer Games magazine, comparing it unfavorably with other LaserDisc games. One of the two reviewers was game designer Eugene Jarvis, who criticized the collision detection and the lack of realistic gameplay or direction, but he praised the "sense of power" and "macho feel" it gives, particularly with the explosions.

== Legacy ==
Astron Belt was responsible for starting the LaserDisc interactive movie craze when it was shown at the 1982 AMOA show. One of the games it inspired was Dragon's Lair (1983).

Sega introduced a sequel, Star Blazer, at Tokyo's Amusement Machine Show (AM Show) in September 1983. It was unanimously hailed as the "strongest" LaserDisc game of the show. Bally Midway distributed it as Galaxy Ranger in North America in 1984. It had the same controls and very similar gameplay to Astron Belt, and one machine could be converted to the other by simply changing the LaserDisc, game ROMs, and sound board. In Japan, Game Machine listed Star Blazer on their January 15, 1984 issue as being the third most-successful upright arcade unit of the month.

== See also ==
- List of LaserDisc games
