= Noval 760 =

1977 computer model

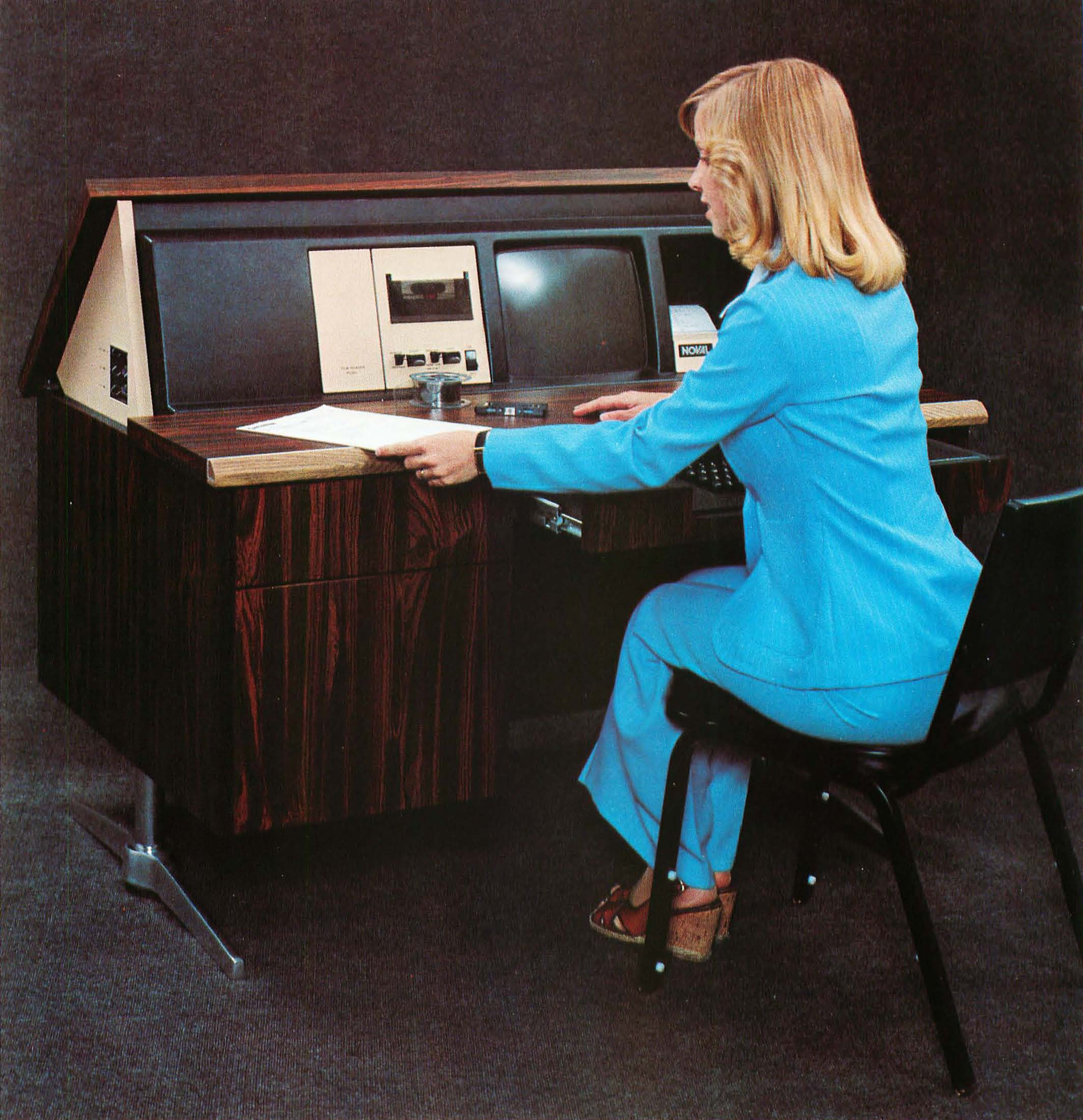
- A Noval 760 in use
- Developer: Noval, Inc. (Gremlin Industries)
- Type: Home computer
- Released: June 1977; 49 years ago
- Discontinued: 1979; 47 years ago
- CPU: Intel 8080A; Zilog Z80 (later revision)
- Memory: 16–32 KB of RAM

The Noval 760 (also known as the Noval 760P) was a home computer developed by Noval, Inc., a subsidiary of Gremlin Industries, in 1977. The Noval 760 sports a unique form factor, in which the computer is built into a wooden office desk, with the computer portion of the desk's top able to pivot in and out of view. The Noval 760 ran off an 8080A and features 16 KB of RAM stock, an editor/assembler in ROM, and a data tape drive. The computer sold poorly and was discontinued in 1979, after Sega had purchased Noval's parent company Gremlin.

== Development and specifications ==
The Noval 760 was developed by Noval, Inc., a subsidiary of Gremlin Industries. Gremlin was at the time a successful coin-operated game company who had recently entered the video arcade game industry with a number of successful titles, including Blockade (1976). Gremlin launched the Noval, Inc., subsidiary, in early 1977, in order to compete in the nascent microcomputer industry. They tasked James D. Nash (senior systems programmer), Agoston "Ago" Kiss (VP and general manager), George Kiss (Ago's son and software manager), Lane Hauck (director of research and development) and Terry Sorenson (chief engineer) to develop the flagship Noval 760.

Unique to the Noval 760 is its form factor, in which the computer is built into a rosewood office desk. The desk's top is split lengthwise down the middle, with the 12-in monitor, data tape drive, a built-in, 32-column printer, and control panel forming a monolithic assembly occupying the back half. The back computer half lifts into view via a pivot point and handle when the operator wants to use the computer, and lowers back into the desk when the operator wants to utilize the whole of the desk's top. Similarly, the computer's built-in keyboard slides in and out of the central drawer.

Otherwise, the Noval 760 originally ran off an Intel 8080A and features 16 KB of RAM (expandable to 32 KB), a built-in line editor and assembler in ROM, and 3K of programmable ROM. It also sports a proprietary digital data tape drive system, dubbed Phi-Deck, that is software controlled. The Noval 760 is capable of displaying graphics (in color on a separate external monitor) in 256 × 224 pixels and is capable of generating audio with a sound chip and internal speaker built into the desk chassis.

The computer has eight I/O ports on the rear for external peripherals. Optional was an EPROM burner, a paper tape reader, a filmstrip viewer, dual handheld keyboards for two-player video games, and BASIC on PROM or cassette.

As the computer was based on the same hardware as their arcade cabinets, the Noval 760 is capable of directly running Gremlin's arcade games, at least up to their 1978 roster. Noval also collaborated with the San Diego Unified School District to develop a number of educational software titles for grades 2 through 6. Although first announced in Byte magazine in June 1977, it took until mid-1978 for the computer to receive a wide release. Cited as a major difficulty in development was the company's choice of vendors for the actual desk itself—the hardware and software was mostly locked down by early 1977. Noval went through three furniture suppliers before they found an adequate supply of desks. In the meantime, the computer received a hardware refresh in early 1978: the 8080A replaced with the Zilog Z80, and the stock RAM was bumped up to the 32-KB ceiling.

== Sales and reception ==
The Noval 760 was publicly unveiled at the inaugural Midwest Personal Computing Show in June 1977. The Chicago Tribune writer Peter Gorner wrote that it was the most visually striking computer unveiled at the event, finding that it "resembled a finely crafted stereo console". Former Byte writer and computer collector Michael Nadeau wrote that the computer looked sharp but was conceptually flawed and destined to sell poorly: "How many people would be looking for a desk and a computer at the same time? And what happens when you wanted to upgrade to a new computer?"

Indeed, the Noval 760 sold sluggishly and sporadically. Besides the sales to San Diego Unified, Noval also sold the computer to a traffic school in San Diego. After Sega acquired Gremlin Industries, the company ended development of the computer and shuttered the Noval subsidiary. Noval 760 systems continued to be used internally within Gremlin as a development workstation for several years, however.

An intact Noval 760 still survives in the custody of the Computer History Museum in Mountain View, California.
