= Star Trek: Strategic Operations Simulator =

1983 video game

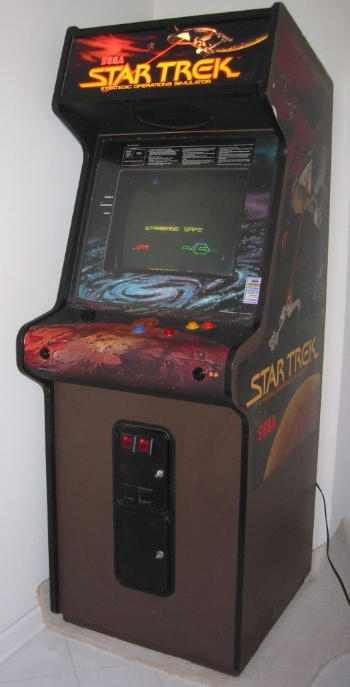
- Developer: Sega Electronics
- Publisher: Sega
- Designer: Sam Palahnuk
- Series: Star Trek
- Platforms: Arcade, Atari 8-bit, Atari 2600, Atari 5200, TI-99/4A, VIC-20, Apple II, Commodore 64, ColecoVision
- Release: January 1983: Arcade; NA: January 1983 Atari 8-bit, 2600, 5200, 99/4A, VIC-20; October 1983 Apple II, C64; 1983 ColecoVision; 1984
- Genre: Space combat simulator
- Mode: Single-player
- Arcade system: G80 vector

Star Trek: Strategic Operations Simulator is a space combat simulation arcade video game based on the original Star Trek television program and movie series, and released by Sega in 1983. Star Trek uses color vector graphics for both a 2D display and a 3D first-person perspective, and features synthesized speech. The player controls the Starship Enterprise and must defend sectors from invading Klingon ships.

The game was manufactured in two styles of cabinets: an upright standup, and a sit-down/semi-enclosed deluxe cabinet with the player's chair modeled after the Star Trek: The Motion Picture's bridge chairs with controls integrated into the chair's arms.

Star Trek was ported to the Commodore 64, TI-99/4A, Atari 8-bit computers, Atari 5200, Atari 2600, VIC-20, ColecoVision, and Apple II.

== Gameplay ==
The player is presented with multiple views of the play field. Survival depends on the player's ability to effectively use and manage shield energy, photon torpedoes, and warp energy. These are replenished by docking with starbases, which sometimes must be saved from destruction at the hands of the Klingons.

The controls use a weighted spinner for ship heading control and buttons to activate the impulse engines, warp engines, phasers, and photon torpedoes. The phaser button is simply marked "fire."

Star Trek on Atari 2600

== Reception ==
Electronic Games stated in August 1983 that "Star Trek is sure to be a top-grosser in the arcades this year. If you can squeeze through the crowd around the machine, you may never want to leave."

ANALOG Computing wrote in January 1984 that the Atari 8-bit version "sounds a lot like Star Raiders (a classic worth aspiring to). Purists will shake their heads and say 'The first is always the best,' and in this case I must agree with them", adding that the arcade version was superior. The magazine concluded, "This incarnation of Star Trek probably won't impress a hard-core Atari computer gamer".

About 500 arcade machines were given away as part of a promotion for Halfsies cereal between 1982 and 1983.

In 2016, Den of Geek ranked Strategic Operations Simulator as one of the top four Star Trek games.
