= The Church of Jesus Christ of Latter-day Saints in Thailand =

- Bangkok Thailand Temple
- Area: Asia
- Members: 24,825 (2025)
- Stakes: 4
- Districts: 2
- Wards: 21
- Branches: 23
- Total congregations: 44
- Missions: 2
- Temples: 1 operating
- FamilySearch Centers: 29

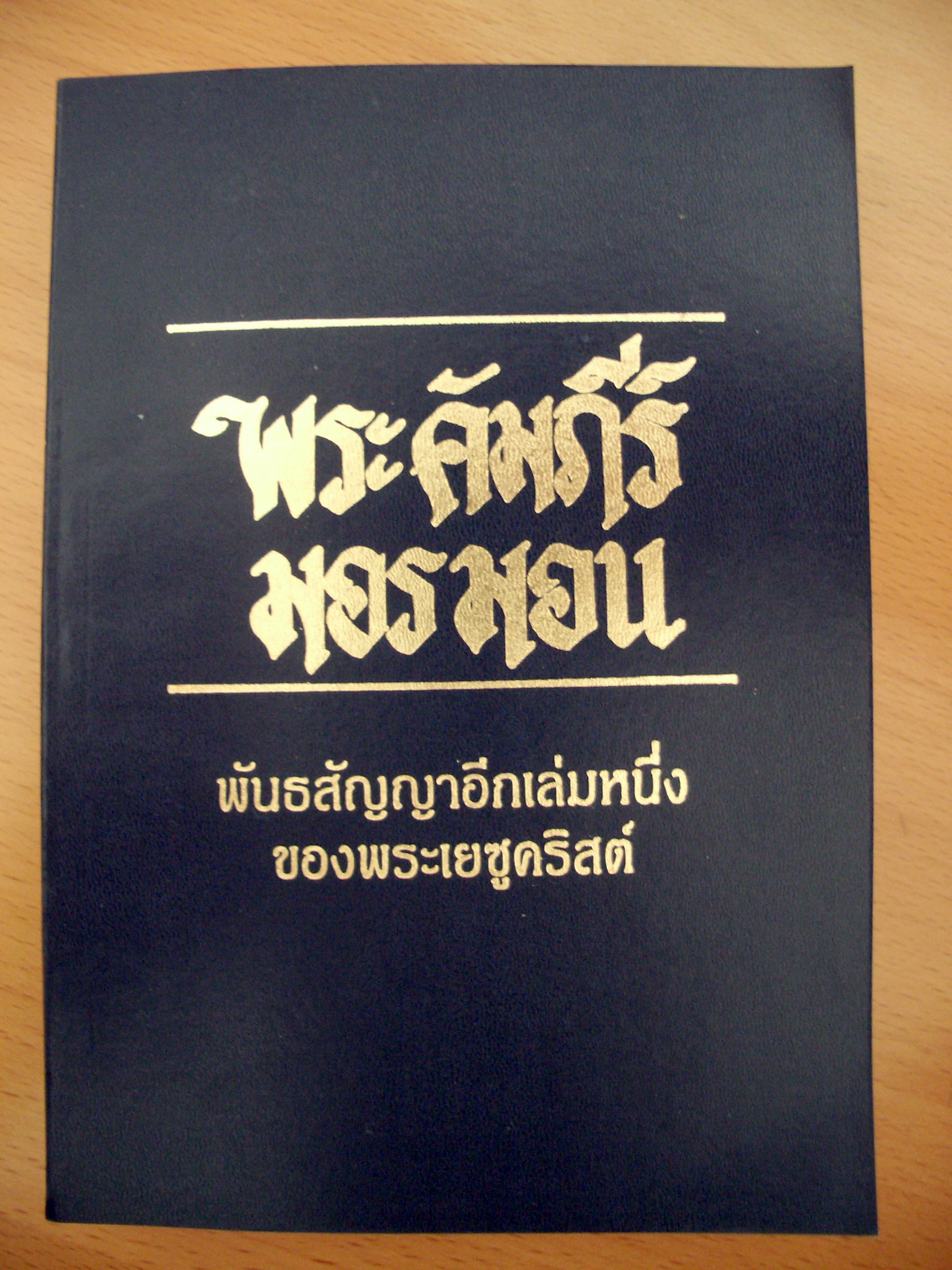
Cover of a Thai translation of the Book of Mormon

The Church of Jesus Christ of Latter-day Saints (LDS Church) (Thai: ศาสนจักรของพระเยซูคริสต์แห่งวิสุทธิชนยุคสุดท้าย, RTGS: satsanachak khong phra yesu khrit haeng wisutthichon yuk sutthai) in Thailand was officially established in 1966 when it was dedicated for missionary work by Gordon B. Hinckley, of the Quourm of the Twelve Apostles. A previous attempt at missionary work was made in 1854 when church president Brigham Young sent four missionaries to Thailand (known as Siam at the time). The only missionary to arrive was Elam Luddington, whose only baptisms during his four-month service in Thailand were a non-Thai ship captain and his wife on April 9, 1854.

The first modern LDS Church missionaries in Thailand were assigned from the church's Southern Far East Mission. They arrived in Bangkok on February 2, 1968. Five missionaries were sent from Taiwan and one from Hong Kong under the direction of President Keith E. Garner who presided over the mission from headquarters in Hong Kong. The five missionaries from Taiwan were Elders Peter W. Basker, Craig G. Christensen, L. Carl Hanson, Larry R. White and Robert W. Winegar. The missionary sent from Hong Kong was Elder Alan H. Hess.

The first known baptism of a native in Thailand was Nangnoi Thitapoora on September 11, 1966. She was taught by U.S. servicemen.

The Book of Mormon was translated twice. The first translation, which took about six years, was completed in 1976 by Srilaksana Suntarahut. A new translation was completed in 2010.

Missionary work was challenging in the 1970s and 1980s because of restrictions from Thai immigration law that prohibited more than 100 foreign missionaries in Thailand at a time and then required that missionaries leave the country every 90 days to renew their visas. Baptisms grew after 1992, when the law was repealed, and missionaries were required to renew their visas only once during their two-year service.

The Bangkok Mission was established on July 19, 1973, with Paul D. Morris as its first president. The church's first stake in Thailand was organized on June 19, 1995, by Neal A. Maxwell. In April 2015, Thomas S. Monson announced plans to build the church's first temple in Bangkok. The project was expected to be completed in four years, but was subjected to many delays, mostly due to the COVID-19 pandemic.

In 2022, the LDS Church reported 23,450 members and one mission in Thailand. The Bangkok Thailand Temple, Thailand's first, was dedicated on 22 October 2023, by Ronald A. Rasband. In February 2024 the Thailand Bangkok West and the Thailand Bangkok East missions were announced creating two mission from the original Thailand Bangkok Mission.

== History ==
Membership in Thailand
Year	Membership
1975	779
1979	1,398
1989*	3,600
1999	10,808
2009	16,195
2019	23,043
2025	24,825
*Membership was published as an estimated or rounded number. Source: Windall J. Ashton; Jim M. Wall, Deseret News, various years, Church Almanac Country Information: Thailand

=== Beginnings ===
In the early 1850s, church president Brigham Young, sent four missionaries to serve in Siam (Thailand). Upon arriving in Calcutta, India in 1853, only two of the four missionaries remained assigned to serve in Siam as a result of challenges due to the war between the Burmese government and the East India Trading Company. Elam Luddington and Levi Savage attempted to sail to Siam from Burma, but were forced to return to India when their ship encountered problems. They arrived in Burma in August 1853. Because Savage was too ill to go to Siam, Luddington arrived in Siam alone on April 6, 1854. Luddington's only baptisms were the ship captain, James Trail, and his wife, three days after his arrival. Luddington would spend a little over four months in Siam, working only with European residents as he was unable to speak Thai. During his service, Luddington was stoned twice and poisoned once. He returned to San Francisco on June 27, 1855, due to his lack of success and the language barrier.

=== Missionary efforts ===
The influence of the LDS Church was largely absent from Thailand for about a century. Church members in the 1950s and early 1960s held informal church services before they were given official authorization to hold church meetings in Bangkok in 1961. Some small congregations of United States servicemen were established on some United States Air Force bases during the Vietnam War. In 1962, Robert S. Taylor, president of the South Far East Mission, organized the first official congregation of church members. Latter-day Saint military servicemen added numbers to the group during the war. In 1973 and 1974, Gordon B. Hinckley traveled to Thailand to inquire as to whether the country was prepared for proselyting. A Mutual Improvement Association was organized in September 1964, meeting in a private restaurant after having outgrown the living room of a home. The first non-Thai person baptized in Thailand since 1854 was a serviceman named Jim McElvee. He was baptized on January 21, 1966.

On March 27, 1966, Keith E. Garner organized the Thailand District of the Southern Far East Mission with Stirling Merrill as president. The congregation in Bangkok had over 200 members by July 1966, so the Bangkok Branch was organized with Gordon M. Flammer as branch president. The country was officially dedicated for missionary work by Gordon B. Hinckley on November 2, 1966, in Lumphini Park. The area became a part of the Southern Far East Mission, presided over by Keith B. Garner. Hinckley found property for $77,000 for a chapel, which was purchased in 1967. Due to struggles receiving Thai government approval, it wasn't until February 2, 1968, that missionaries were allowed to enter the country. Six missionaries from Taiwan and Hong Kong were transferred to Bangkok: Peter Basker, Craig Christensen, Alan Hess, Carl Hanson, Larry White, and Robert Winegar. Soon thereafter, the missionaries began an intensive three-week language program at the American University Alumni School and had the missionary lessons translated into Thai by a translator. Full-time proselyting began on March 6, 1968, and the first missionary lesson was held in the Thai language on March 17 with the help of Anan Eldredge. Boonepluke and Rabiab Klaophin, baptized on May 15, 1968, were the first converts by missionaries in Thailand.

In June 1968, Garner decided to send missionaries to Korat, the third largest city in Thailand. The church's influence grew quickly in Korat, with baptism services held monthly. W. Brent Hardy replaced Garner as president of the Southern Far East Mission in July 1968. Re-translations of the missionary lessons were initiated, but this was difficult because the hired translators were unfamiliar with LDS Church terminology and the Thai language doesn't have equivalent words for Christian subjects. In December 1968, Ezra Taft Benson, of the Quorum of the Twelve Apostles, attended a quarterly district conference in Bangkok. There, he had the opportunity to meet King Rama IX of Thailand. Benson personally presented the King with a Thai Book of Mormon and Joseph Smith's Testimony, and a copy of Meet the Mormons. By the end of 1968, there were eight missionaries working in Thailand. In 1969, the numbers had grown to twenty-five missionaries. For a short period of time beginning in 1969, Thailand become a part of the Southeast Asian Mission with G. Carlos Smith Jr. as president, allowing more time to be focused on Thailand as a mission country, allowing missionary work to move faster. In 1970, construction began on the Asoke Chapel, on the property that was purchased in 1967, mostly funded by Latter-day Saint servicemen stationed in Thailand. In August 1974, after a slow construction process, the first Latter-day Saint chapel was dedicated in Bangkok. In 1970, missionaries were sent to Chiang Mai and Khon Kaen with twelve other cities opening up for missionary work in the six years that followed. Smith created a missionary basketball program in 1969 to increase the church's visibility in the surrounding areas. The team played in tournaments and received much publicity. In August, Music and the Spoken Word from Salt Lake City was aired over Thai radio in Korat and an open house program was initiated in Chiang Mai. The general missionary approach at the time was to introduce non-members to the LDS Church in a casual and non-threatening manner.

In order for missionaries in Thailand to have closer supervision, the Thailand Mission was created, with Paul D. Morris as president, on July 19, 1973. The name was changed to the Thailand Bangkok Mission on June 20, 1974. The experience Morris had with Asia and Asian culture allowed him to improve LDS Church and Thai relations, working to adapt teaching materials and pictures to the Thai culture. Morris initiated translation work of books and church manuals, strengthened local leadership, increased media attention of missionaries and members through the radio, and encouraged local members to publish articles about the church in local newspapers. During his presidency, women missionaries were sent to Thailand, in part to help with welfare services. In 1975, Morris started a missionary singing group called Sidthichon Yuk Sud Tai ("the Latter-day Saints"). They toured the country, performing in front of thousands, blending Western and Thai sounds. They performed on television in Bangkok and received good reviews, increasing interest in the LDS Church.

Harvey D. Brown became the second president of the Thailand Bangkok Mission in August 1976. His presidency focused on building and re-building the image of the church in Thailand. The "Sidtichon Yuk Sud Tai" group continued to perform, raising money for charities and programs such as the Thai International Red Cross, Bangkok Teachers College, hospitals, and a drug rehabilitation program. They received an invitation to perform for the King's charity event, meeting the King and Queen afterwards. During its more than four year long existence, the group appeared on TV 70 times, recorded five albums, performed for royalty three times, and did 500 live performances for over one million people in all of Thailand's major cities. After the visa problems improved and the LDS Church was viewed more positively, the group was disbanded by Brown in July 1979, having fulfilled its intended purpose.

At the end of 1976, 170 missionaries were serving in Thailand; however, government pressures required the missionary count to drop to 125 missionaries. By 1985, less than 100 missionaries served in Thailand. This policy was changed in 1992. In 1980, Marion D. Hanks, a church general authority, became the executive administrator over Southeast Asia. He created a refugee mission that took care of refugees from Vietnam, Laos, and Cambodia from the Vietnam War in Thailand and also preached to them for ten years. In 1988, Anan Eldrege was the first Thai to preside over the Thailand Bangkok Mission. He initiated the first temple excursions to the Philippines.

==== First Thai church members ====
The first Thai convert to the LDS Churchwas Nangnoi Thitapoora who was baptized on September 11, 1966. The first Thai male convert was Anan Eldredge, who was baptized on December 24, 1967. The surname Eldredge comes from the surname of a Latter-day Saint family working in Thailand who offered to adopt him so he could attend college in the United States. Anan was a great help to the missionaries working in Thailand after his baptism, helping them with the language and translation of church materials. Anan Eldredge became the first Thai to serve a full-time mission. Eldredge attended college in California and met and married a Latter-day Saint woman from England. Eldredge helped work on the revised translation of the Book of Mormon into Thai, and helped with the translations and publishing of the Doctrine and Covenants and the Pearl of Great Price into Thai. In 1988, Anan Eldredge became the first Thai president of the Thailand Bangkok Mission, influencing a steady increase in church membership during his service.

=== Translation of the Book of Mormon ===
The first translation of the Book of Mormon was principally done by Srilaksana Suntarahut. Her father was the doctor for the monarchs Vajiravudh and Indrasakdi Sachi. Srilanksana was adopted by the Queen and spent her childhood living in the palace where she received an exceptional education. After Srilaksana met the missionaries, she was baptized on July 4, 1968, with two of her daughters. The church originally intended to use a professional translator, but felt that it would be better if the translator was knowledgeable about the Book of Mormon and the church. Regardless, a paid translator was chosen and along with help from a committee of Thai church members including Srilaksana. The Book of Mormon began to be translated in 1970. Srilaksana struggled with severe health problems during the translation process. After Prayun, the professional translator's contract was finished, Srilaksana became the principal translator of the Book of Mormon at the beginning of 1971. She did not receive payment for her work until the Thailand Bangkok mission was formed in 1973. She would review and correct the previous translation and the translation committee, largely consisting of missionaries, would make sure the doctrinal concepts were correct. Specific challenges in translation included issues surrounding "word for word" translation requirements and the difficulty in choosing translations for Western Christian words that did not exist in Thai such as "priesthood". After reviewing and revising, the Book of Mormon translation into Thai was complete in August 1975 and the first copies were printed in October 1976. A re-translation was completed in 2010.

=== Later developments ===
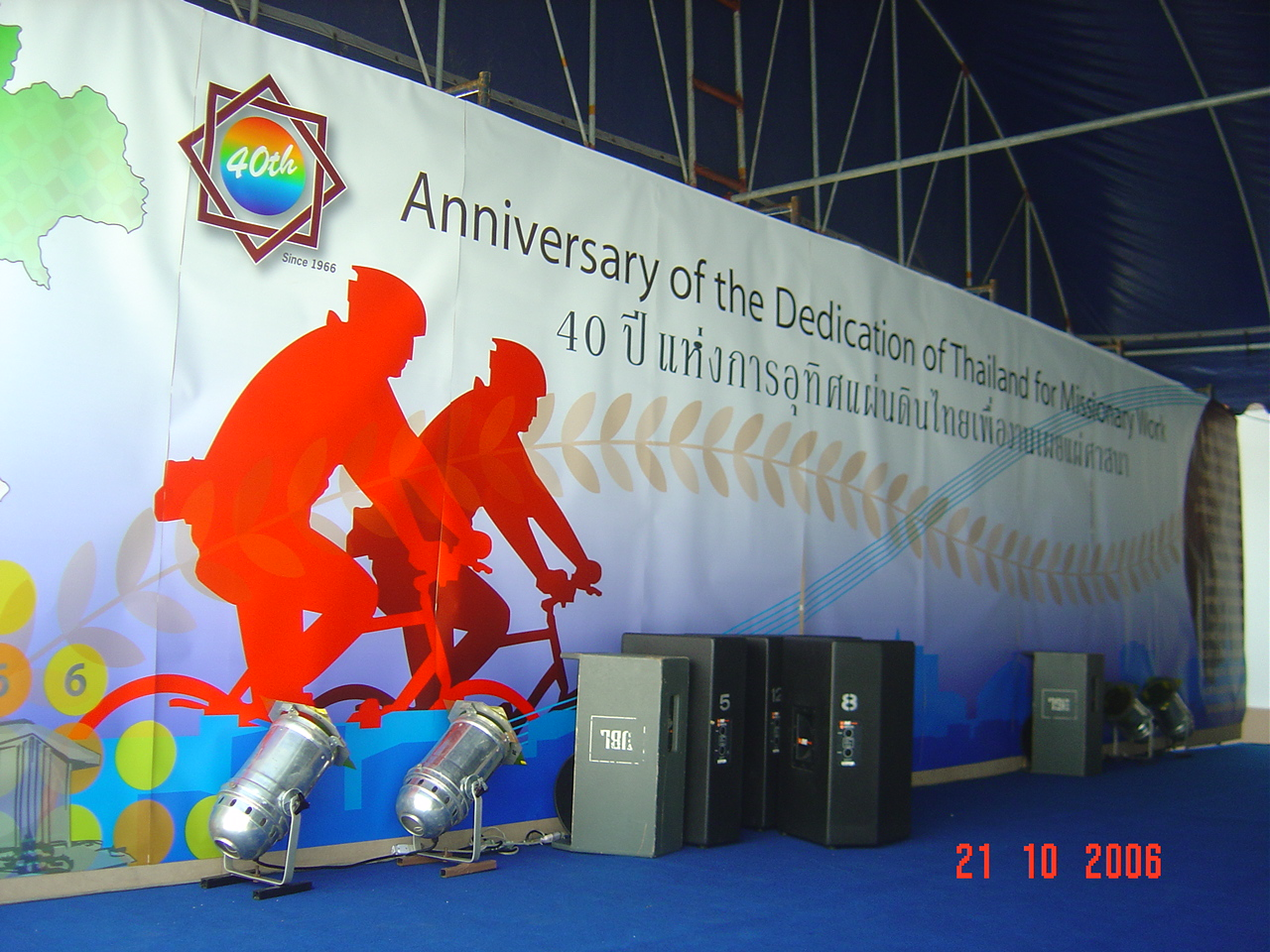
40th Anniversary of the Dedication of Thailand for Missionary work

In 1987, three more church buildings were dedicated in Bang Na, Thonburi, and Chiang Mai. After the repeal of the restrictive visa laws, missionary work increased throughout Thailand as more mission areas were opened. In 1993, more than four hundred baptisms were performed, resulting in four districts and twenty-five branches in Thailand. There were eleven chapels and more being constructed as church membership rose to six thousand. After Troy L. Corriveau became mission president, the Thailand Stake was organized on June 18, 1995, by Neal A. Maxwell, containing five wards, three branches, and 2,260 members. Pornchai Juntratip became the first patriarch in Thailand. The Bangkok North Stake was created on June 15, 2014, by Gerrit W. Gong. In 2013, there were approximately 650 baptisms and by the middle of 2014, there were over 1,000 baptisms performed. During his global ministry tour, church president Russell M. Nelson and Jeffrey R. Holland, of the Quorum of the Twelve Apostles, gathered with and spoke to church members in Thailand on April 20, 2018. Church leaders estimated that this was the largest gathering of Latter-day Saints in the country's history.

== Obstacles to missionary work ==
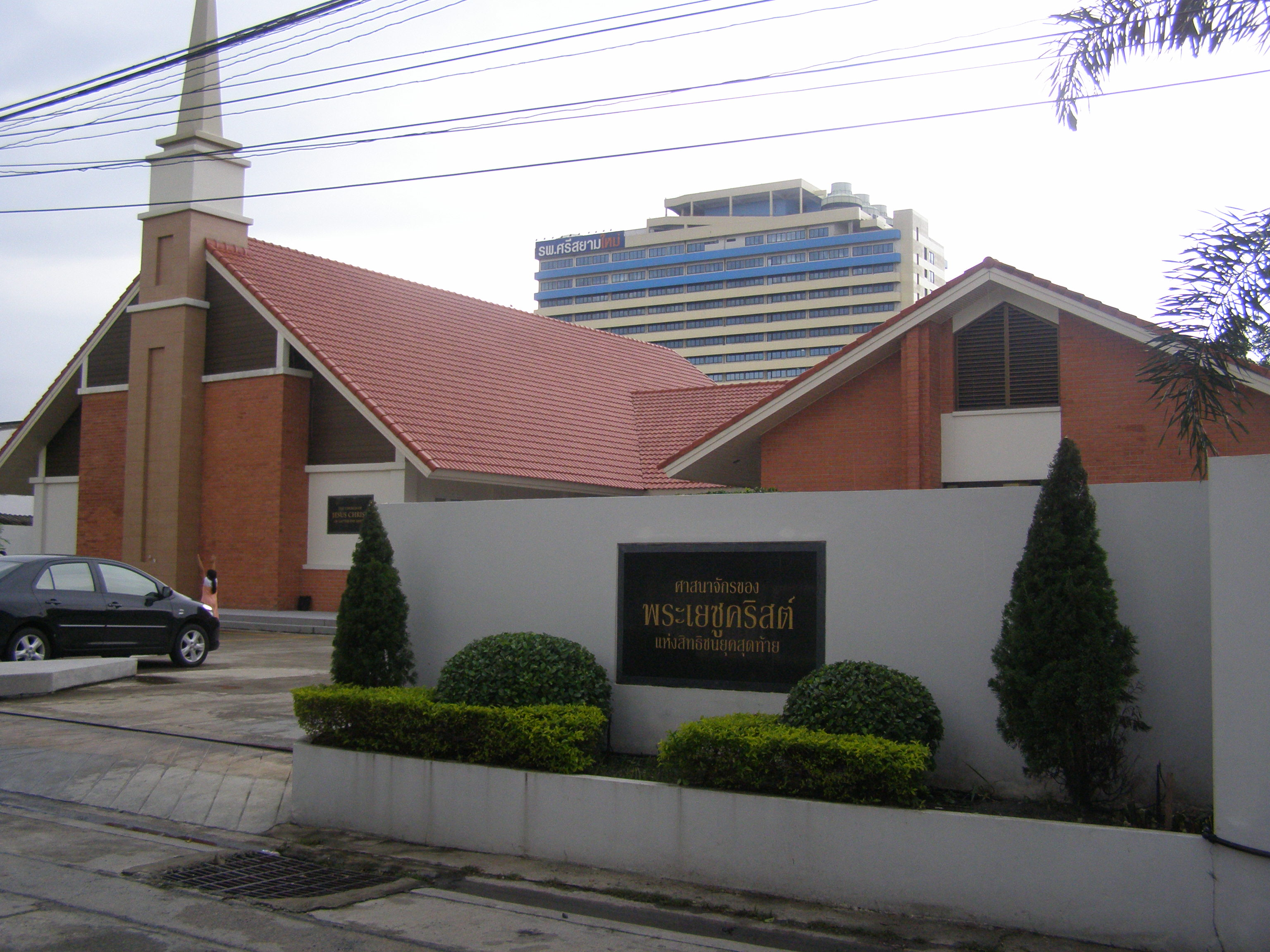
A meetinghouse in Nuanchan, Bueng Kum, Bangkok, Thailand

According to R. Lanier Britsch, Thai people are very devoted to their country, king, traditions, and religion, particularly Buddhism. According to the Government's National Statistics Office, Theravada Buddhism makes up about 94 percent of practiced religions in Thailand. Islam and Chinese religions make up the second and third most practiced religions in Thailand. Despite the fact that Roman Catholics have proselyted in Thailand for 400 years and Protestants have proselyted for 160 years, Christianity makes up less than one percent of the practiced religions in Thailand. Although the LDS Church is not recognized by the Thai government as an official religion, practice is allowed freely. According to historian Spencer J. Palmer, Thai people are exceptionally tolerant of religion, to the point where it is difficult to perform successful missionary work, because it is challenging to impose just one set of beliefs upon the people. Furthermore, religion and country are intricately and closely related in a way that becoming anti-Buddhist means becoming anti-Thai in many cases. Thus, few are willing to give up their country, family, and traditions to convert other religions, including Christianity. Despite the usual language and cultural barriers that pose challenges to Christian missionary work in Asian countries, there is a specific lack of success in Thailand as compared to other Asian countries even ones in where they are predominantly Buddhist. According to Erik Cohen, there are three reasons why Christian converts are difficult to find in Thailand. First, there are fundamental differences in the views of Christianity and of Buddhism. Second, Buddhism permeates almost every aspect of life in Thailand and the individual identity of a Thai person. Lastly, the attitudes of Catholic and Protestant missionaries in the earlier history of Thailand were often judgmental and inflexible.

In 1972, a group of Latter-day Saint missionaries traveled to Sukhothai, the ancient capital of Thailand. One of the missionaries climbed on an ancient Buddha relic, sitting on its shoulders and had his photo taken by another missionary. A photo shop employee noticed the photo and sent it to the Siam Rath on July 9, 1972. Other newspapers included the image, causing it to spread. The Thai people felt that the elders disrespected Buddhism and Thailand. Thai Christians separated themselves from the LDS Church, some writing articles against the church. The missionaries were arrested on July 12, 1972, and were found guilty of desecrating a Buddhist image and insulting the Buddhist religion. They were sentenced to a maximum six months in jail, for which they served the full-time. After their release, they were deported from Thailand. This event was widely publicized. Due to this event, Nakhon Sawan was closed as a missionary area and baptisms dropped throughout Thailand. Following this incident, relations with the immigration office in Thailand became challenging. Foreign missionaries were only allowed to obtain 30-day non-immigrant visas. Through a process of extensions and requests for permanent visas (which were always denied), foreign missionaries could legally stay in Thailand for about 90 days but then had to leave the country and re-enter on a new 30-day non-immigrant visa. From 1972 until mid-1975, missionaries traveled from Bangkok to Cambodia on Cambodian visas, then immediately returned to Thailand on new 30-day non-immigrant visas, which could again be extended to about 90 days. Once the Cambodian border closed in mid-1975, foreign missionaries in Thailand traveled to Laos for visa renewal. When the Laotian border was later closed, foreign missionaries were forced to make expensive and long journeys to Malaysia for visa renewal. After Anand Panyarachun was reinstated as Prime Minister of Thailand, a new visa category was created which allowed foreign missionaries to stay in Thailand for the two-year mission and only required them to renew their visas one time during their time in Thailand. The last visa renewal trip to Malaysia was in August 1992.

Stake Centers in Thailand as of September 2026
Green = Stake
Orange = District
Purple = meetinghouse not part of stake or district

The coup d'états of Thailand in 1991 and 1992 initiated violent demonstrations in Thai cities. Missionaries were told to stay away from demonstration areas. Larry R. White, the mission president at the time, warned missionaries to stay in their apartments; he also canceled a scheduled district meeting in Khon Kaen.

== Stakes and Districts ==
Stake/District	Organized	Mission
Bangkok Thailand Stake	18 Jun 1995	Thailand Bangkok East
Bangkok Thailand North Stake	19 Sep 1999	Thailand Bangkok West
Bangkok Thailand West Stake	15 Jun 2014	Thailand Bangkok West
Chiang Mai Thailand District	24 Feb 1974	Thailand Bangkok West
Phitsanulok Thailand District	30 Aug 2026	Thailand Bangkok West
Ubon Thailand Stake	3 Dec 1991	Thailand Bangkok East
Udorn Thailand District	23 Jul 1995	Thailand Bangkok East

== Missions ==
The Thailand Bangkok Mission includes all of Thailand, Laos, and Myanmar (Burma), although Thailand is the only country within the mission with meetinghouses. Individuals and families not in proximity to a meetinghouse are served by the Thailand Bangkok Mission Branch. The mission office for the Thailand Bangkok mission is located adjacent to the Bangkok Thailand Temple. In June 2024, the mission was split resulting in an east and west mission.

== Temples ==
The intent to build the church's first temple was announced by Thomas S. Monson on April 5, 2015, during general conference. At that point, the closest temple to the church members in Thailand was 1,000 miles away in Hong Kong. The temple is 48,525 square feet and six stories tall. The temple was dedicated on 22 October 2023 by Ronald A. Rasband.

185. Bangkok Thailand Temple; Official website; News & images	
Location: Announced: Groundbreaking: Dedicated: Size: Notes:	Bangkok, Thailand; 5 April 2015 by Thomas S. Monson; 26 January 2019 by Robert C. Gay; 22 October 2023 by Ronald A. Rasband; 48,525 sq ft (4,508.1 m^{2}) on a 1.77-acre (0.72 ha) site A 91,370 square feet (8,489 m^{2}) church facility on property behind the temple houses two meetinghouses, a service center, seminary and institute offices and classrooms, mission offices and housing.

== See also ==
- Christianity in Thailand

== Bibliography ==
- Britsch, R. Lanier (1998). From the East: The History of the Latter-day Saints in Asia, 1851-1996. Salt Lake City, Utah: Deseret Book Company. ISBN 1573452688.
- Cohen, Erik (1995). "Chrisitanization and Indigenization: Contrasting Processes of Religious Adaptation in Thailand". In Kaplan, Steven (ed.). Indigenous Responses to Western Christianity. New York: New York University Press. p. 36. ISBN 0814746497.
- Garr, Arnold K.; Cannon, Donald Q.; Cowan, Richard O., eds. (2000). Encyclopedia of Latter-day Saint History. Salt Lake City, Utah: Deseret Book Company. pp. 1243–1244. ISBN 1573458228.
- Goodman, Michael A. (2016). "Religious and Cultural Influences Faced by the First LDS Missionary in Thailand". In Goodman, Michael A.; Properzi, Mauro (eds.). The Worldwide Church: Mormonism as a Global Religion. Provo, Utah: Brigham Young University. ISBN 9780842529730.
- Haslam, Reed B. (2006). Translating Scripture: The Thai Book of Mormon. Sandy, Utah: H-town Publishing. ISBN 097779640X.
- Palmer, Spencer J. (1970). The Church Encounters Asia. Salt Lake City, Utah: Deseret Book Company.
