= Vector monitor =

Type of display device

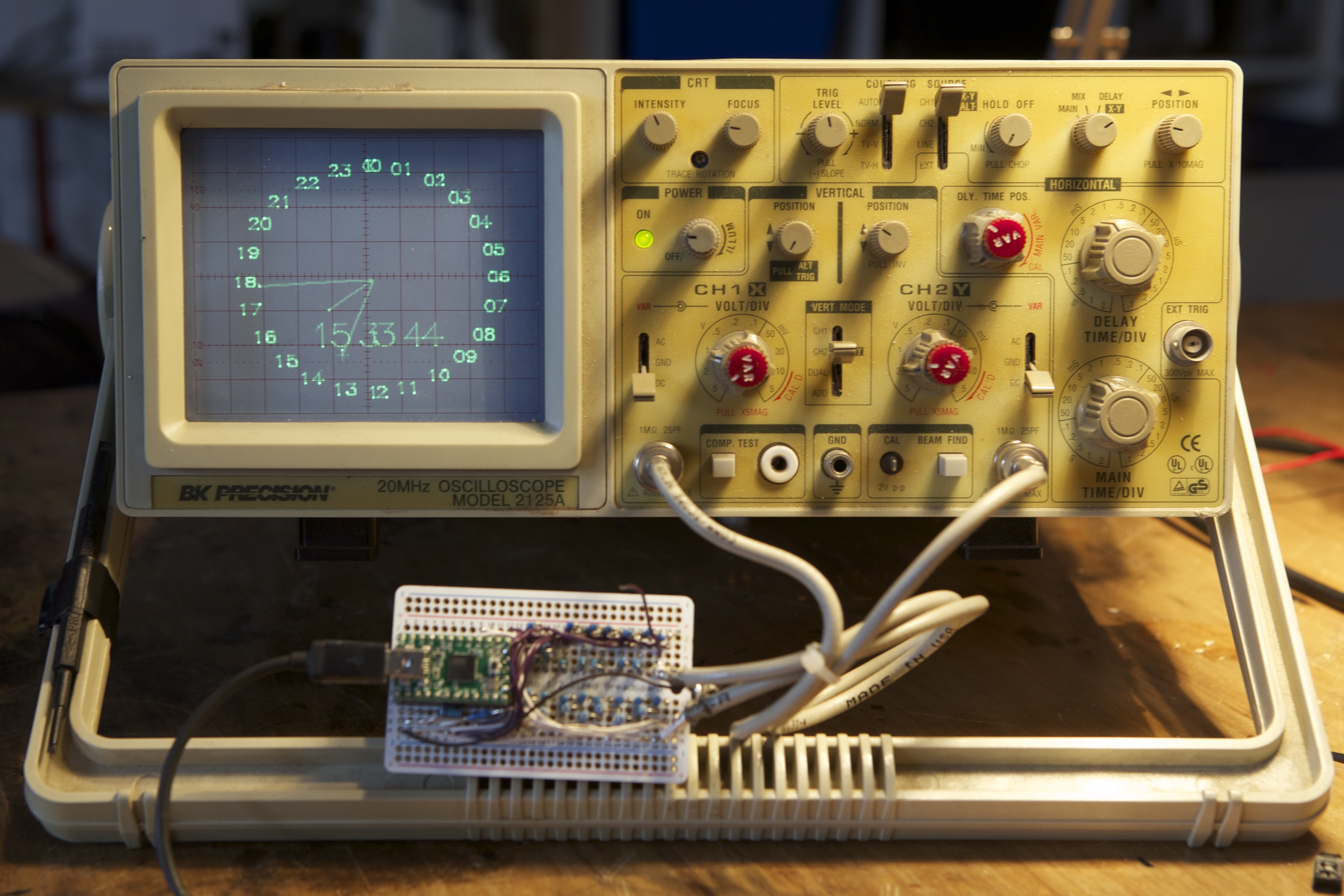
A 24-hour clock displayed on an oscilloscope configured as a vector monitor in X-Y mode with dual R2R DACs to generate the analog voltage

A vector monitor, vector display, or calligraphic display is a display device used for computer graphics up through the 1970s. It is a type of CRT, similar to that of an early oscilloscope. In a vector display, the image is composed of drawn lines rather than a grid of glowing pixels as in raster graphics. The electron beam follows an arbitrary path, tracing the connected sloped lines rather than following the same horizontal raster path for all images. The beam skips over dark areas of the image without visiting their points.

Some refresh vector displays use a normal phosphor that fades rapidly and needs constant refreshing 30-40 times per second to show a stable image. These displays, such as the Imlac PDS-1, require some local refresh memory to hold the vector endpoint data. Other storage tube displays, such as the popular Tektronix 4010, use a special phosphor that continues glowing for many minutes. Storage displays do not require any local memory. In the 1970s, both types of vector displays were much more affordable than bitmap raster graphics displays when megapixel computer memory was still very expensive. Today, raster displays have replaced nearly all uses of vector displays.

Vector displays do not suffer from the display artifacts of aliasing and pixelation—especially black and white displays; color displays keep some artifacts due to their discrete nature—but they are limited to displaying only a shape's outline (although advanced vector systems can provide a limited amount of shading). Text is crudely drawn from short strokes. Refresh vector displays are limited in how many lines or how much text can be shown without refresh flicker. Irregular beam motion is slower than steady beam motion of raster displays. Beam deflections are typically driven by magnetic coils, and those coils resist rapid changes to their current.

== History ==
The vector display was first invented by Jonathan Zenneck via use of a Braun cathode-ray tube. His solution was able to produce fundamental waveforms using two deflection coils a high-powered cathode inside of the tube to create a continuously swept image. This device was utilized by early radio engineers, but was not practical until John Bertrand Johnson implemented the hot cathode to drastically reduce the voltage requirements for the device. The Cathode Ray Oscillograph was subsequently commercialized and became the basis for the modern oscilloscope.

Oscilloscopes were used by electrical engineers to map out physical forces, as well as by recording engineers to understand the nature of human voices. The displays also became a frequent add-on to advanced electronic analog computers to visualize complex forces. The first RADAR systems utilized vector graphic oscilloscopes to map aircraft positions.

Vector graphics in computers first emerged with the Whirlwind system built by the Massachusetts Institute of Technology's Lincoln Laboratory. Utilizing oscilloscope tubes, the Whirlwind displays could produce complex readings of airborne trajectory, as well as played host to the first graphical demo, Bouncing Ball (1951). In 1956, the first light pen was implemented on the Whirlwind system. These technologies then became the basis for the advanced US SAGE air defense system which was fully active in 1958.

In 1963, Ivan Sutherland at MIT first used a vector graphic display for Sketchpad, his pioneering CAD program. In 1968, he and his team again used a vector monitor to display wireframe images of 3D models. This time the display was head mounted. The obviously heavy system was held up by a support arm structure called The Sword of Damocles. The system is widely considered to be the first computer-based virtual reality. Ivan Sutherland later co-founded the company Evans & Sutherland, which made high-end vector displays and flight simulators.

In 1970, at the UK Farnborough Airshow, Sperry Gyroscope (Bracknell, England) exhibited the first ever vector graphic video display from a UK company. It featured an analogue monochrome display with special electronics, designed by Sperry's John Atkins, that allowed it to draw vectors on screen between two pairs of coordinates. At Farnborough the display was used to demonstrate the capabilities of the new Sperry 1412 military computer - it was shown running software that drew, in real time, a wire-frame rotating cube that could be speed-controlled in any of its three dimensions. That demonstration created significant interest in the Sperry 1412 computer, which then went on to be at the heart of a number of major projects for the French Navy and the Royal Navy during the period 1972 to 1992.

== Examples ==
Notable among vector displays are Tektronix large-screen computer terminals that use direct-view storage CRTs. (The CRT has at least one flood gun, and a special type of display screen, more complicated in principle than a simple phosphor.) But that permanent image cannot be easily changed. Like an Etch-a-Sketch, any deletion or movement requires erasing the entire screen with a bright green flash, and then slowly redrawing the entire image. Animation with this type of monitor is not practical.

Vector displays were used for head-up displays in fighter aircraft because of the brighter displays that can be achieved by moving the electron beam more slowly across the phosphors. Brightness was critical because the display needed to be clearly visible to the pilot in direct sunlight.

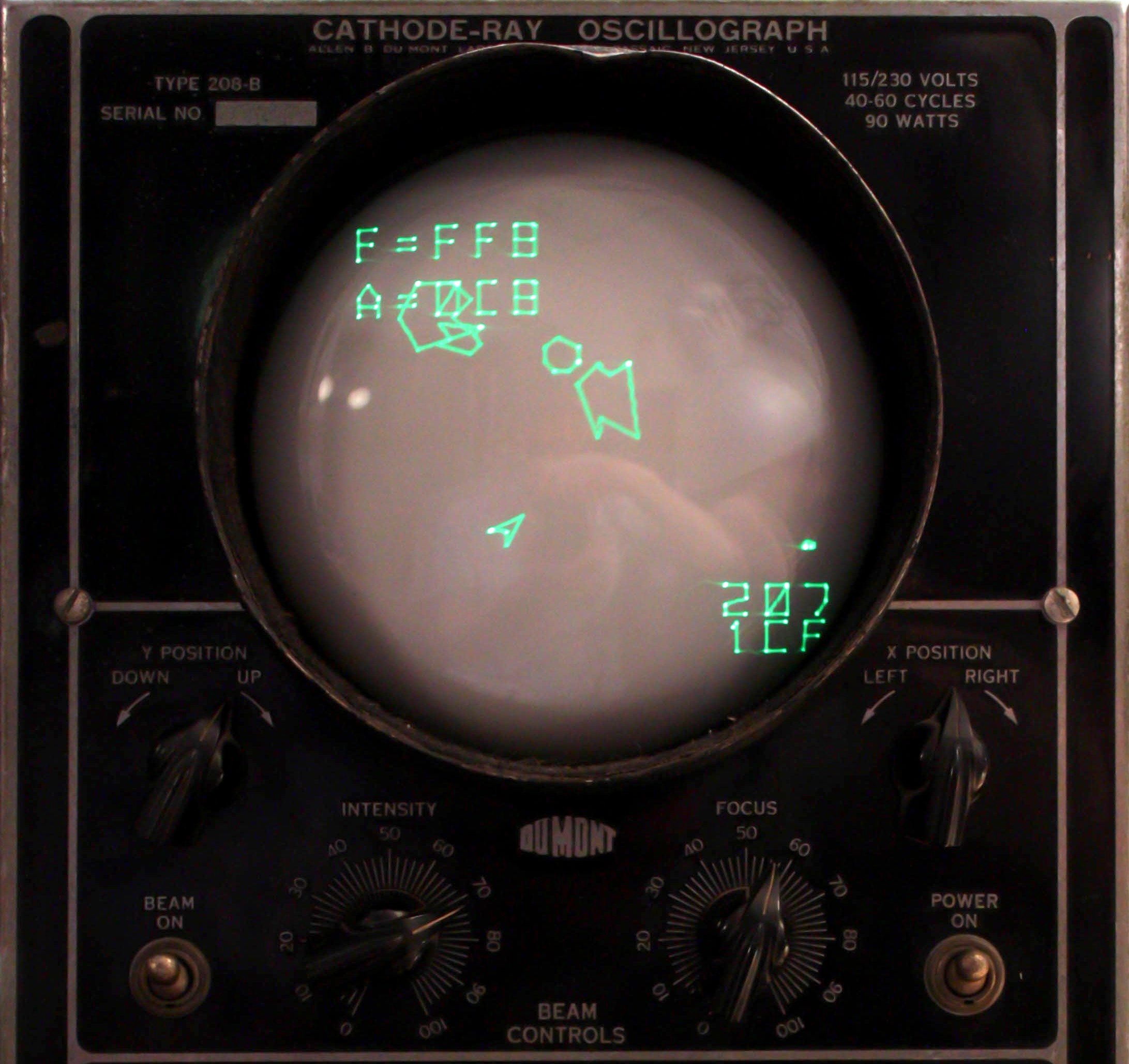
A free software Asteroids-like video game played on an oscillograph configured in X-Y mode

Vector monitors were also used by some late-1970s to mid-1980s arcade games such as Armor Attack, Asteroids, Omega Race, Tempest, and Star Wars, and in the Vectrex home videogame console.

Hewlett-Packard made a series of large-screen X-Y (vector) displays, the first of which was the 20 MHz 8x10-inch model 1300. The CRT had an internal, specially contoured, very fine mesh operating at low potential, which was placed after the deflection plates at the gun exit. The 17KV electrostatic field between this mesh and the separate, conductive coating charged to final accelerating potential inside the CRT funnel, accelerated the electron beam axially as well as radially, expanding the possible image size to cover the 8x10" screen of the 17.75-inch long CRT. Without the mesh, the 8x10-inch CRT would have had to be almost three times as long. Expansion mesh technology was developed in the early 1960s by the need to drive deflection plates at high frequencies in compact high-brightness CRTs operating at high acceleration voltages, to take advantage of the then-new transistor technology which was limited to only low voltages. The much bulkier and less efficient vacuum-tube electrostatic deflection amplifiers were able to operate at hundreds of volts.

The Digistar planetarium projection system, made by Evans & Sutherland, was originally a vector display that could render both stars and wire-frame graphics. Later versions use high resolution raster projection, but the vector-based Digistar and Digistar II were installed in many planetariums, and a few may still be in operation. A Digistar prototype was used for rendering 3D star fields for the film Star Trek II: The Wrath of Khan. Another E&S vector display, the Picture System II, was possibly also used for the film.

== Color displays ==
Some vector monitors are capable of displaying multiple colors, using either a typical shadow mask RGB CRT or two phosphor layers (so-called "penetration color"). In the penetration tubes, by controlling the strength of the electron beam, electrons can be made to reach (and illuminate) either or both phosphor layers, typically producing a choice of green, orange, or red. Tektronix made color oscilloscopes for a few years using penetration CRTs, but demand for these was low.

Atari used the term color quadrascan to describe the shadow-mask version used in their video arcade games.

Some monochrome vector displays were able to display color using peripherals such as the Vectrex 3-D Imager.

== See also ==
- Vector graphics
- Vectrex
- Raster scan
