= Shaded Picture System =

- Manufacturer: Evans & Sutherland Computer Corp.
- Type: computer graphics terminal and 3D display processor
- Released: October 1973; 51 years ago
- Display: 256 by 256
- Graphics: raster, black and white

The Shaded Picture System was a 3D raster computer display processor introduced by Evans & Sutherland in October 1973.

The Shaded Picture System was the first general-purpose, commercially available raster computer graphics display processor capable of real-time, shaded 3D graphics. It could only display black and white graphics at a resolution of 256 by 256. It was extremely expensive, and very few units were ever sold.

== History ==
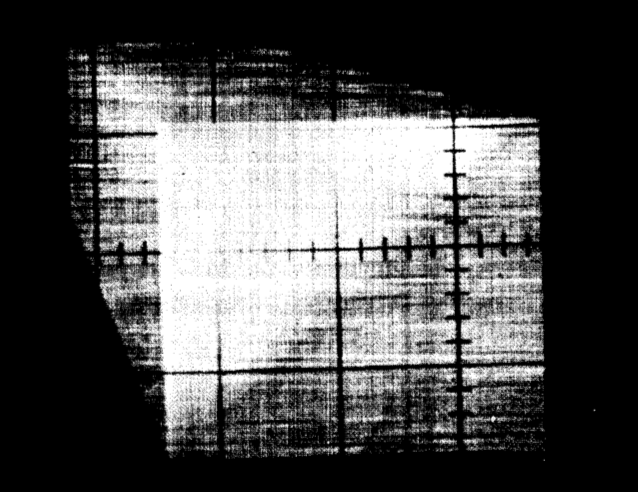
An image of a cube generated by the first algorithm at the University of Utah in 1967.

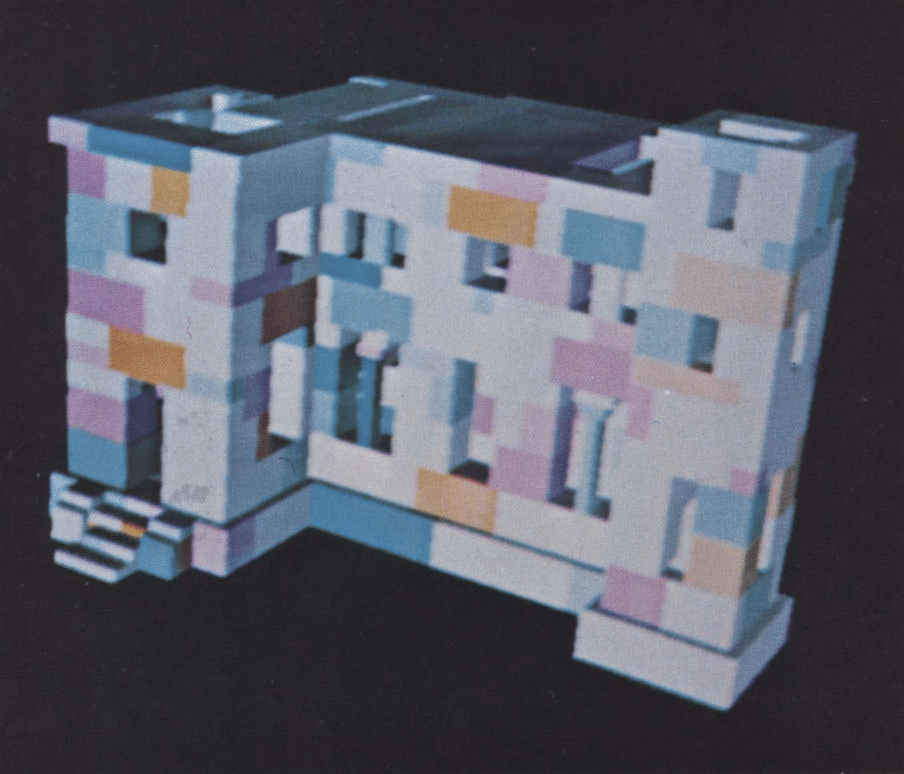
A color image of a church generated by the FORTRAN simulator of the Watkins algorithm at the University of Utah in 1970.

The principles of shaded, hidden-line true 3D graphics were pioneered at the University of Utah in 1967. However, this algorithm was slow and would take several minutes to produce an image. In 1970, Gary Watkins developed a FORTRAN simulator of a faster algorithm that would theoretically generate shaded 3D images in real-time, "if implemented in suitable hardware". The simulator itself was still not capable of real-time shaded 3D image rendering. Evans & Sutherland developed a functional prototype of this "suitable hardware", which was later sold as the Shaded Picture System in 1973.

About a year earlier in 1972, Evans & Sutherland sold the first and only CT1 to Case Western Reserve University. The CT1, or Continuous Tone 1, was a specialized image generator, not meant as a marketable or mass-produced product. At the time, the CT1, along with G.E./NASA's upgraded Electronic Scene Generator from 1971, would have been the only real-time raster graphics systems sold to customers comparable to the Shaded Picture System, although both the CT1 and Electronic Scene Generator were intentionally produced as one-off products and specialized for the needs of their customers. The Shaded Picture System, in contrast, was intentionally marketed.

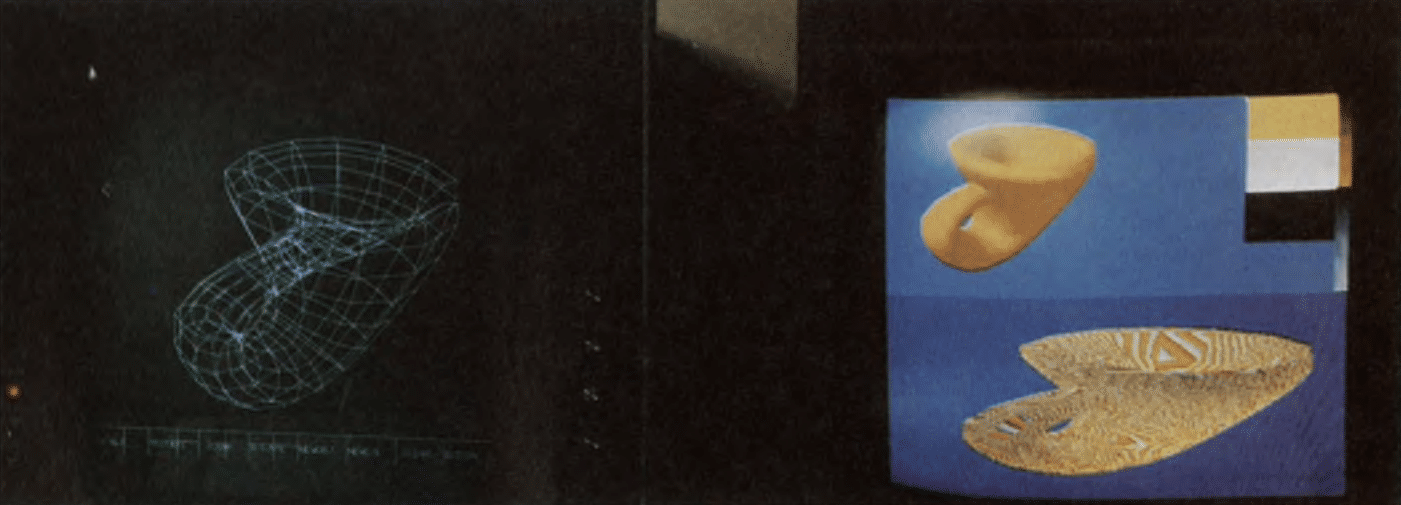
An image of a Klein bottle generated by an E&S Picture System (left) and displayed shaded and in color on the frame buffer (right) in 1975.

In early 1975, Evans & Sutherland demonstrated a random-access video frame buffer using relatively low-cost semiconductor memory, which was much more capable than the Shaded Picture System. When interfaced with a (non-shaded) E&S Picture System, the frame buffer had a resolution of 512 by 512 in grayscale and partial color capabilities. By the end of 1975, this frame buffer was commercially available.

== See also ==
- LDS-1 (Line Drawing System-1)
