= John C. Wells Planetarium =

The John C. Wells Planetarium is located on the campus of James Madison University in Harrisonburg, Virginia. The planetarium first opened at JMU in 1956 under the direction of Dr. John C. Wells, head of the Physics Department. The facility was then moved to Miller Hall and renovated in 1975, later named in honor of Wells on the occasion of his retirement in 1980.

The planetarium seats 72 individuals within a 30-ft dome. It features a GOTO Chronos star projector together with Evans & Sutherland Digistar 5 digital projectors. The John C. Wells Planetarium also employs students enrolled at James Madison University to operate the system and host shows to the public.

== Usage ==
In the early years of the Miller Hall Planetarium, not yet named after John Wells, all laboratories in the General Studies astronomy course met in the planetarium as well as other astronomy classes such as "Controversies in Astronomy" and "Planetary Astronomy". As the planetarium grew older, it began scheduling astronomy instruction for off-campus groups. It also hosts regular public shows and special events such as Starry Nights Harrisonburg, Space Explorers Camp, and Bad Science Movie Nights.

== Timeline ==
- Late 1940s: James Madison University, then Madison College, purchased its first planetarium to be installed in the attic of Burruss Hall
- 1956: Planetarium first installed on JMU's campus by Dr. John C. Wells, who was a professor in the JMU Physics Department (1947–1988), Department Head (1956–1974), and Planetarium Curator (1979–1988). It was placed in the attic of Burruss Hall during the fall semester. The cost of the installation was $500 for the Spitz Model A star projector, and about $850 for the 20-ft fabric dome. Dr. John C. Wells built the console at the cost of approximately $100. Usage was mainly for school groups and college classes.
- 1975: Moved to Miller Hall, where it is still currently located. A Goto II star projector replaced the obsolete equipment in Burruss, manufactured in Japan and installed at a cost of $47,000 by Planetariums Unlimited, a branch of Viewlex Audio-Visual, Inc. The cost of $47,000 was considerably lower than the other two bids offered by Minolta and Spitz because Viewlex was preparing to cease marketing Goto planetarium projectors in the country. Spitz is now the U.S. Goto representative. The old Spitz Model A, the dome, and console were given to the Augusta County School Division in hopes that it would be installed at the county educational center at Fishersville, VA.
- 1979: Dr. John Wells retired from the Physics Department June 30, 1979, continuing to work at the Planetarium until 1980.
- 1980: Planetarium is officially named after Dr. Wells
- 2005: Renovations made to the Planetarium; closed to the public for the following three years (3-year Hiatus)
- 2008: Renovations complete; Planetarium opened to the public, Rededicated to Dr. Wells due to his death in 2005. A Digistar 3 full-dome projector system was installed alongside GOTO, which allowed for full-dome movies in conjunction with a traditional star talk about the constellations.
- Summer 2013: Evans & Sutherland Digistar 5 ultra-high definition digital projection system is added to the Planetarium.
