= Digistar Users Group =

Digistar Users Group (DUG) is an international association of facilities that own Evans & Sutherland (E&S) Digistar systems.

== History ==
The Digistar Users Group began in the mid-1980s as an informal gathering of planetarians. The first gathering took place in St. Louis, Missouri (USA). At the time, there were only five Digistar systems worldwide. Today, there are more than 250 Digistar-equipped planetaria on six continents. The current Digistar product line includes Digistar II, Digistar 3, Digistar 4, Digistar 5 and Digistar 6 in various configurations appropriate for domes of nearly any size.

== Membership ==
Membership in the Digistar Users Group is voluntary; membership is restricted to facilities (such as science centers, planetariums, schools, universities and other organizations) that own or have a signed contract to purchase a Digistar system. Membership is by institution only. Institutions become members upon payment of annual membership dues.

Membership in DUG is required in order to access the DUG show/model library, past newsletters, meeting notes, standards documents, charter and standing rules, and other content. Membership is currently, in 2025, $40(US) per year, payable to the DUG Treasurer. Evans & Sutherland pays the first year dues for new Digistar installations. After that time, it is the site's responsibility to maintain contact with the organization and keep membership active.

== Governance ==
The Digistar Users Group Executive Committee has five positions: President, President Elect, Past President, Secretary, and Treasurer. While ownership of Digistar system is required for membership, the DUG organization operates independently of system manufacturer E&S. Elected positions may not be held by employees of Evans & Sutherland or commercial members, but any member of DUG may be appointed to a standing committee. The official DUG website lists current officers and posts.

== Activities ==
The Digistar Users Group provides a forum for discussion regarding the Digistar computer graphics projection systems and issues of interest to the facilities that own Digistar systems. DUG also provides an avenue for exchange of sequences, models and other products created for Digistar environments. Digistar Users Group maintains a dialogue with Evans & Sutherland on matters of service, improvements and other areas of interest to Digistar users.

DUG maintains an electronic library of content freely-shared among active DUG members, an on-line forum, and a secure website. A regular newsletter is published for members.

One of the primary activities of the Digistar Users Group is the annual conference, which offers the opportunity for users to meet, exchange production techniques, discuss planetarium operations concerns, interact with Evans & Sutherland representatives, learn system maintenance techniques, and suggest ideas for new Digistar features. Other activities include participation in IPS technology and standards efforts and ongoing member communication and peer assistance.

== Digistar Facilities ==
Today there are Digistar systems in almost any venue imaginable, including planetariums, colleges, universities, K-12 schools, science centers, museums, entertainment destinations and other locations. On its website, E&S includes a partial list of Digistar Installations.

== Digistar Users Group Website ==
DUG maintains a web site at digistardomes.org. Some parts of the website are open to the public while other parts are members only.
