= Puebla Mexico Temple =

Planned temple of The Church of Jesus Christ of Latter-day Saints in Puebla, Mexico

- Interactive map of Puebla Mexico Temple
- Number: 191
- Dedication: 19 May 2024, by Gerrit W. Gong
- Site: 6.81 acres (2.76 ha)
- Floor area: 35,861 ft^{2} (3,331.6 m^{2})
- Official website • News & images

Church chronology
← Urdaneta Philippines Temple	Puebla Mexico Temple	→ Taylorsville Utah Temple

Additional information
- Announced: 7 October 2018, by Russell M. Nelson
- Groundbreaking: 30 November 2019, by Arnulfo Valenzuela
- Open house: March 29 to April 20, 2024
- Current president: Francisco Javier Bravo Moises
- Location: Puebla, Puebla, Mexico
- Coordinates: 19°05′05″N 98°14′09″W
- Baptistries: 1
- Ordinance rooms: 4
- Sealing rooms: 3

The Puebla Mexico Temple is a temple of the Church of Jesus Christ of Latter-day Saints in Puebla, Mexico. The intent to build the temple was announced on October 7, 2018, by church president Russell M. Nelson, during general conference. The temple is the 14th in Mexico and first in the state of Puebla. A groundbreaking ceremony, to signify the beginning of construction, was held on November 30, 2019, conducted by Arnulfo Valenzuela, a church general authority.

== History ==
The intent to construct the temple was announced by church president Russell M. Nelson on October 7, 2018, concurrently with 11 other temples. At the time, the number of operating or announced temples was 201.

On September 24, 2019, the church released the groundbreaking date and a rendering of the planned temple. On November 30, 2019, a groundbreaking to signify beginning of construction was held, with Arnulfo Valenzuela, president of the church's Mexico Area, presiding.

On December 11, 2023, the church announced that a public open house would be held from March 29 to April 20, 2024 (excluding Sundays). The temple was dedicated on May 19, 2024, by Gerrit W. Gong of the church's Quorum of the Twelve Apostles.

== Design and architecture ==
The temple's architecture reflects both the cultural heritage of the Puebla region and its spiritual significance to the church. The temple’s design drew inspiration from “the city’s Hispano-American heritage, colonialist baroque aesthetic, local flowers and the area’s well-known and well-recognized Talavera ceramics.”

The temple is situated just south of a highway interchange in the northwestern section of Puebla, occupying a 6.81-acre plot. The temple has landscaped flower-lined walkways and a serene fountain, all designed to create a tranquil environment that enhances the sacred atmosphere of the site.

The temple has an attached end tower topped with a statue of the angel Moroni. This temple’s architecture showcases colonialist baroque aesthetics. The single-story structure is constructed with precast concrete panels.

The interior’s design details are based on the Talavera motifs. Both the interior and exterior of the temple feature art glass windows that draw from “the Mexican geometric motifs and patterns of the local ceramics as well as the traditional colors–the graduated scheme of blue, yellow, orange and green, with cream and white accents.”

The temple includes four ordinance rooms, three sealing rooms, and a baptistry, each arranged for ceremonial use.

The design has elements representing Latter-day Saint symbolism, providing deeper spiritual meaning to the temple's appearance and function. Symbolism is important to church members and include the temple itself, which represents “a beacon of gospel light and hope.”

== Temple presidents ==
The church's temples are directed by a temple president and matron, each serving for a term of three years. The president and matron oversee the administration of temple operations and provide guidance and training for both temple patrons and staff. Since its 2024 dedication, Francisco J. Moises and Luz M. de Bravo have been serving as president and matron.

== Admittance ==
Following completion of the temple a public open house was held from March 29-April 20, 2024 (excluding Sundays). The temple was dedicated in two sessions by Gerrit W. Gong on May 19, 2024.

Like all the church's temples, it is not used for Sunday worship services. To members of the church, temples are regarded as sacred houses of the Lord. Once dedicated, only church members with a current temple recommend can enter for worship.

== See also ==
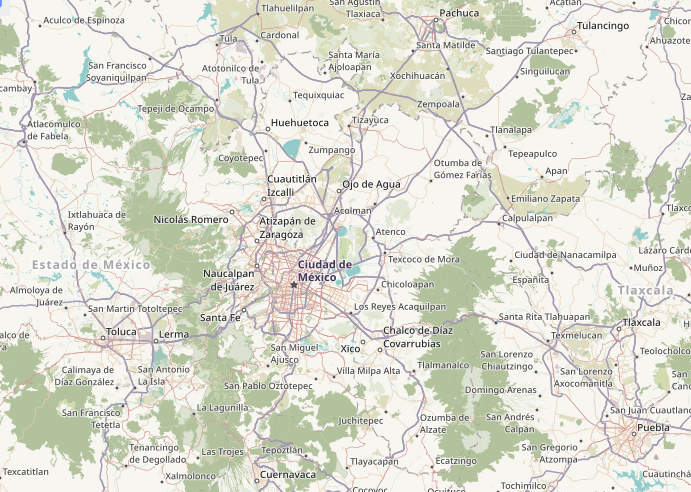

Temples in Central Mexico

Northwestern Mexico Temples
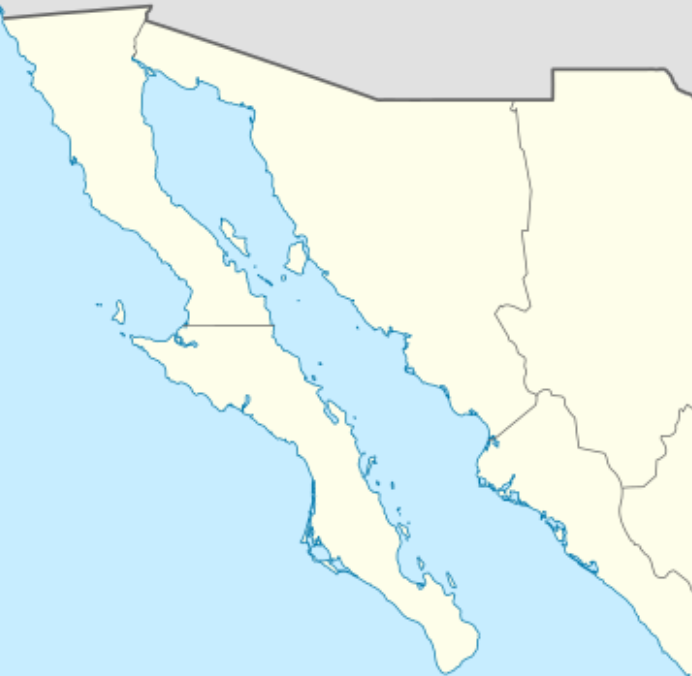
Temples in Northwestern Mexico
Northeastern Mexico Temples
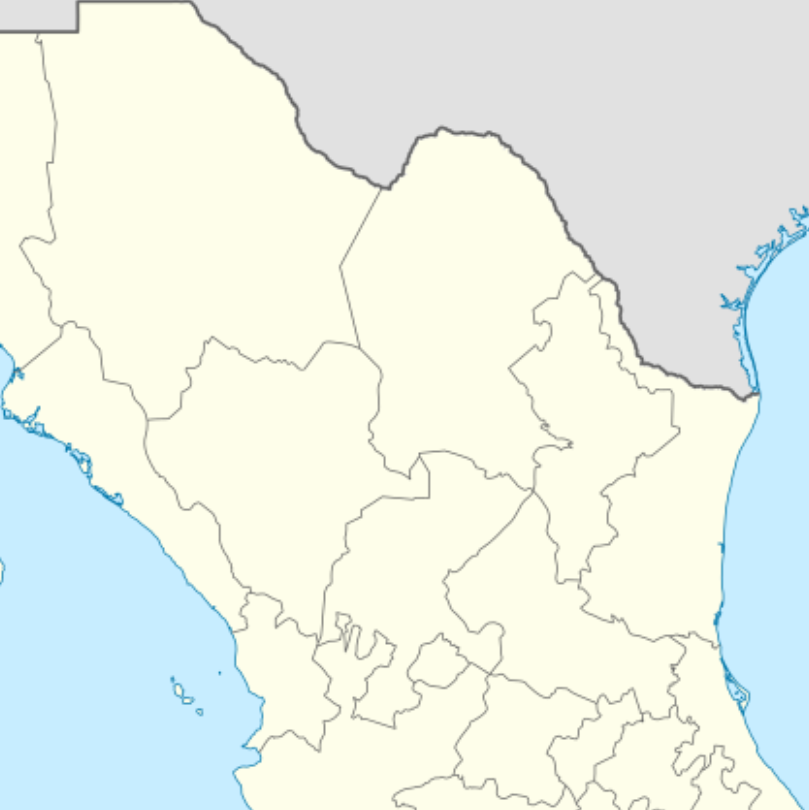
Temples in Northeastern Mexico
Central Mexico Temples
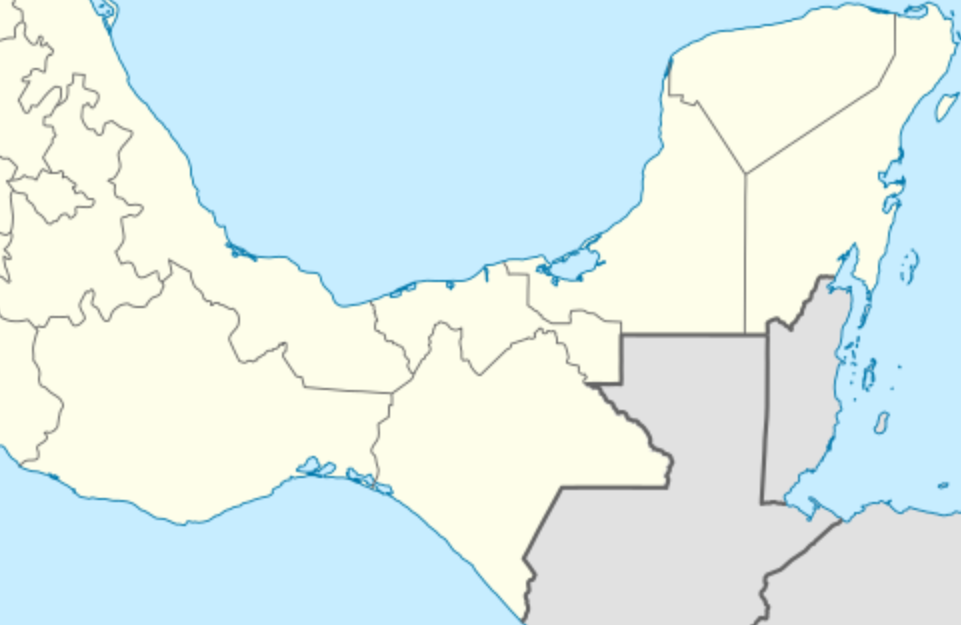
Temples in Southeast Mexico
Mexico Map
Temples in Mexico

= Operating
= Under construction
= Announced
= Temporarily Closed

- The Church of Jesus Christ of Latter-day Saints in Mexico
- Comparison of temples of The Church of Jesus Christ of Latter-day Saints
- List of temples of The Church of Jesus Christ of Latter-day Saints
- List of temples of The Church of Jesus Christ of Latter-day Saints by geographic region
- Temple architecture (Latter-day Saints)
