= True vector =

True vector may refer to:

- A polar vector, one that is not a pseudovector (or axial vector). More formally, a true vector is a contravariant vector, see: Covariance and contravariance of vectors.
- True vector display, as opposed to a simulated or rasterized vector display. see: Vector monitor
