= David F. Evans =

American religious leader

First Quorum of the Seventy
- April 2, 2005 – October 2, 2021
- Called by: Gordon B. Hinckley
- End reason: Granted general authority emeritus status

Emeritus General Authority
- October 2, 2021
- Called by: Russell M. Nelson

Personal details
- Born: David Frewin Evans; August 11, 1951 (age 74); Salt Lake City, Utah, United States
- Spouse(s): Mary Dee Shepherd
- Children: 8
- Parents: David C. Evans; Joy F. Evans

David Frewin Evans (born August 11, 1951) has been a general authority of the Church of Jesus Christ of Latter-day Saints (LDS Church) since 2005.

Evans was born in Salt Lake City, Utah. He grew up in Los Angeles, California, where his father David C. Evans worked for Bendix Corporation. His mother, Joy F. Evans, served as a counselor to Barbara W. Winder in the Relief Society General Presidency from 1984 to 1990. His father went on to co-found Evans and Sutherland, an early computer graphics company.

Evans served as a missionary in the church's Japan Mission from 1970 to 1972. After his mission, he received a bachelor's degree in community health education from the University of Utah and a Juris Doctor from Brigham Young University. He then worked as a member of the Salt Lake City law firm of Durham, Jones and Pinegar. He later worked as an executive with SEI USA in Newport Beach, California, and was a partner in the law firm of Snell and Willmer.

== LDS Church service ==
In the LDS Church, Evans has served as a bishop, stake Young Men president, scoutmaster, and counselor in a stake presidency. From 1998 to 2001, Evans was president of the church's Japan Nagoya Mission.

In 2002, Evans became the president of the Salt Lake University 4th Stake, a stake for married students of the University of Utah living off-campus. In August 2004, it was decided these individuals should attend the regular geographical wards in which they resided and the stake was disbanded. Evans then became president of the Salt Lake Emigration Stake, a position he remained in until his call as a member of the First Quorum of the Seventy at the church's April 2005 General Conference.

As a general authority, he has served as a counselor and as president of the Asia North Area, and also as a counselor in the presidency of the Asia Area and visited Indonesia, Malaysia and Singapore. In addition, he has been an Assistant Executive Director in the church's Priesthood and Missionary departments, and from 2011 to 2015 he served as executive director of the Missionary Department. As executive director of the Missionary Department he was instrumental in integrating technology and announced in 2014 that 6,500 missionaries had been piloting the use of iPad devices and using online proselyting tools such as Facebook. He was succeeded as executive director of the Missionary Department by Brent H. Nielson. In 2019 Evans, as president of the Asia Area, offered the site dedicatory prayer for the Bangkok Thailand Temple.

== Personal life ==
Evans married Mary Dee Shepherd in 1973 and they are the parents of eight children.
