= Bangkok Thailand Temple =

LDS Church temple in Bangkok, Thailand

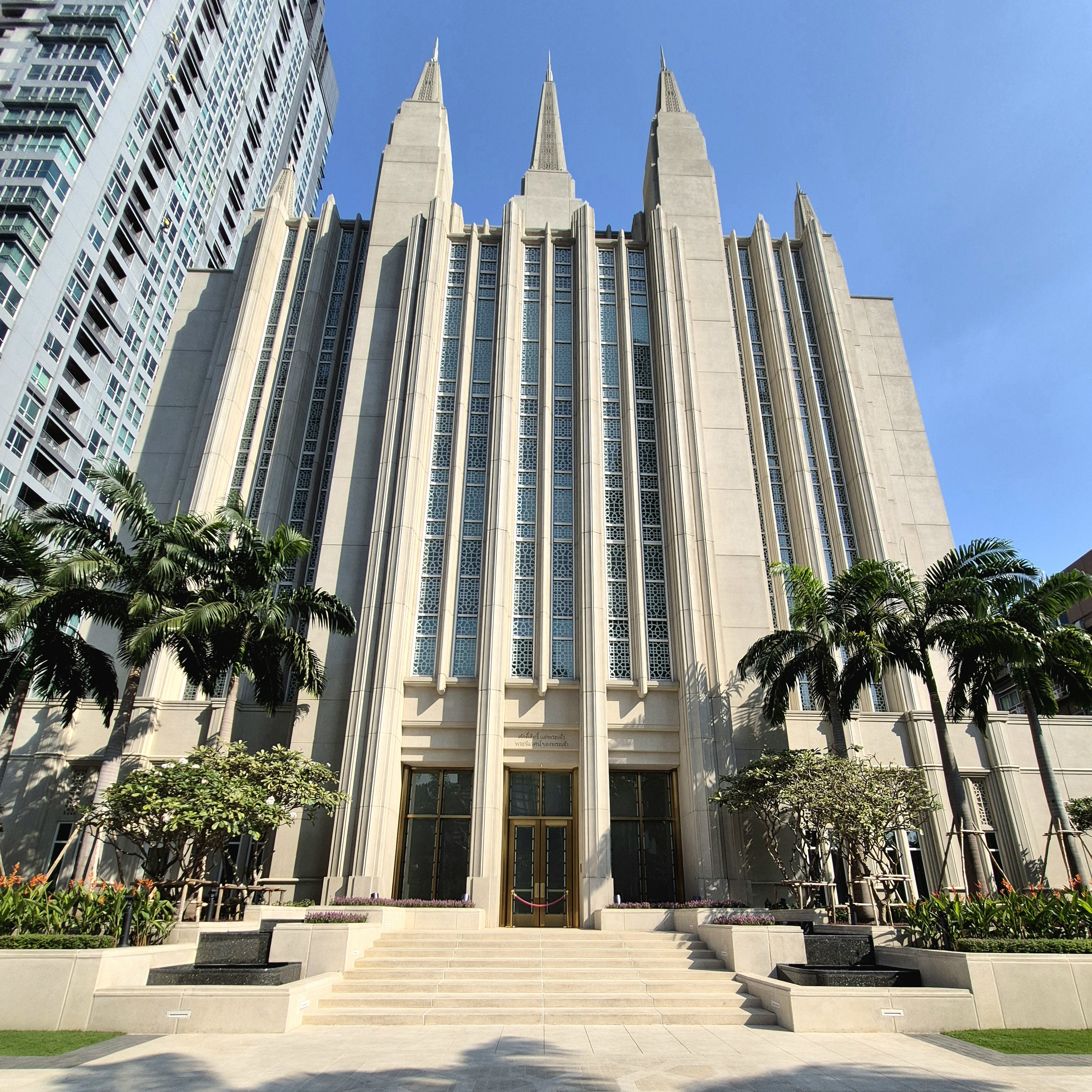
- Interactive map of Bangkok Thailand Temple
- Number: 185
- Dedication: 22 October 2023, by Ronald A. Rasband
- Site: 1.77 acres (0.72 ha)
- Floor area: 48,525 ft^{2} (4,508.1 m^{2})
- Height: 242 ft (74 m)
- Official website • News & images

Church chronology
← Feather River California Temple	Bangkok Thailand Temple	→ Okinawa Japan Temple

Additional information
- Announced: 5 April 2015, by Thomas S. Monson
- Groundbreaking: 26 January 2019, by Robert C. Gay
- Open house: 1-16 September 2023
- Current president: Umporn Parapan
- Location: Bangkok, Thailand
- Coordinates: 13°44′57″N 100°33′45″E
- Exterior finish: Precast concrete panels fabricated by Asia Group of Chom Thong, Bangkok
- Notes: A 91,370 square feet (8,489 m^{2}) church facility on property behind the temple houses two meetinghouses, a service center, seminary and institute offices and classrooms, mission offices and housing.

The Bangkok Thailand Temple is a temple of the Church of Jesus Christ of Latter-day Saints (LDS Church) in Bangkok, Thailand. It is the church's first temple in mainland southeast Asia and was dedicated October 22, 2023.

== History ==
The intent to construct the temple was announced by church president Thomas S. Monson on April 5, 2015, during general conference. The Abidjan Ivory Coast and Port Au Prince Haiti temples were announced at the same time. On January 26, 2019, a groundbreaking to signify beginning of construction was held, with Robert C. Gay, of the Presidency of the Seventy, presiding. David F. Evans, president of the Asia Area, offered the site dedicatory prayer.

On March 27, 2023, the LDS Church announced the public open house that was held from September 1 through 16, 2023, excluding Sundays. The temple was dedicated in two sessions on October 22, 2023, by Ronald A. Rasband, of the church's Quorum of the Twelve Apostles.

== Design and architecture ==
The building uses Thai architecture and traditional Latter-day Saint temple design. The temple's architecture reflects both the cultural heritage of Bangkok and the spiritual significance of the church.

The temple is on a 1.77-acre plot and the landscaping has water fountains alongside trees, shrubs, and perennials. An annex building is also located on the site, and contains church offices, patron housing, two chapels, meeting rooms, seminary and institute facilities, and a FamilySearch center.

The temple has one central spire, surrounded by eight smaller spires, and is 242 feet tall, constructed with precast concrete panels. The exterior uses traditional Thai architecture, “including diamond shapes with lotus flower elements and a herringbone pattern, the latter evoking the weaved palms used in traditional arts and goods.” The exterior also features art glass windows which have silk screens on the outer side and frosted carved glass on the inner side.Both sides of the windows use an interlocking octagonal pattern.

The interior has decorative lighting fixtures inspired by royal sun umbrellas, as well as millwork carvings of ratchaphruek tree flowers. The temple includes two instruction rooms, two sealing rooms, and a baptistry, each arranged for ceremonial use.

Symbolism is important to church members and the design uses elements representing Thai culture including use of Thailand’s national flower, the ratchaphruek tree flower, in the temple’s millwork.

== Temple presidents ==
The church's temples are directed by a temple president and matron, each serving for a term of three years. The president and matron oversee the administration of temple operations and provide guidance and training for both temple patrons and staff. Since its 2023 dedication, the president and matron of the Bangkok Thailand Temple are Wisit Khanakham and Sumamaan S. Khanakham.

== Admittance ==
Following completion of the temple, a public open house was held from September 1–16, 2023 (excluding Sundays).

Like all the church's temples, it is not used for Sunday worship services. To members of the church, temples are regarded as sacred houses of the Lord. Once dedicated, only church members with a current temple recommend can enter for worship.

== See also ==
- The Church of Jesus Christ of Latter-day Saints in Thailand
- Comparison of temples of The Church of Jesus Christ of Latter-day Saints
- List of temples of The Church of Jesus Christ of Latter-day Saints
- List of temples of The Church of Jesus Christ of Latter-day Saints by geographic region
- Temple architecture (Latter-day Saints)
