= Calligraphic projection =

Rendering method for analog displays

Calligraphic projection (also known as vector graphics) is a system for displaying or projecting an image composed of a beam of light or electrons directly tracing the image, as opposed to sweeping in raster order over the entire display surface, as in a standard pixel-based display. Calligraphic projection is presently often used for laser lighting displays, whereby one or more laser beams draws an image on a screen by reflecting the laser beam from one or more mirrors attached to a deflecting mechanism.

Analog oscilloscopes have customarily employed this kind of vector graphics, as did a number of CRT-based vector monitor computer graphics terminals in the 1970s and 1980s, such as the Tektronix 4014 and the Evans & Sutherland Picture System.

One example of a Calligraphic projection is the Lissajous projection, after the mathematical figure (and mathematician).

== See also ==
- Lissajous curve
- calligraphy
- vector graphics
