= Taylorsville Utah Temple =

LDS temple in Utah, U.S.

Coordinates: 40°40′1″N 111°57′15″W

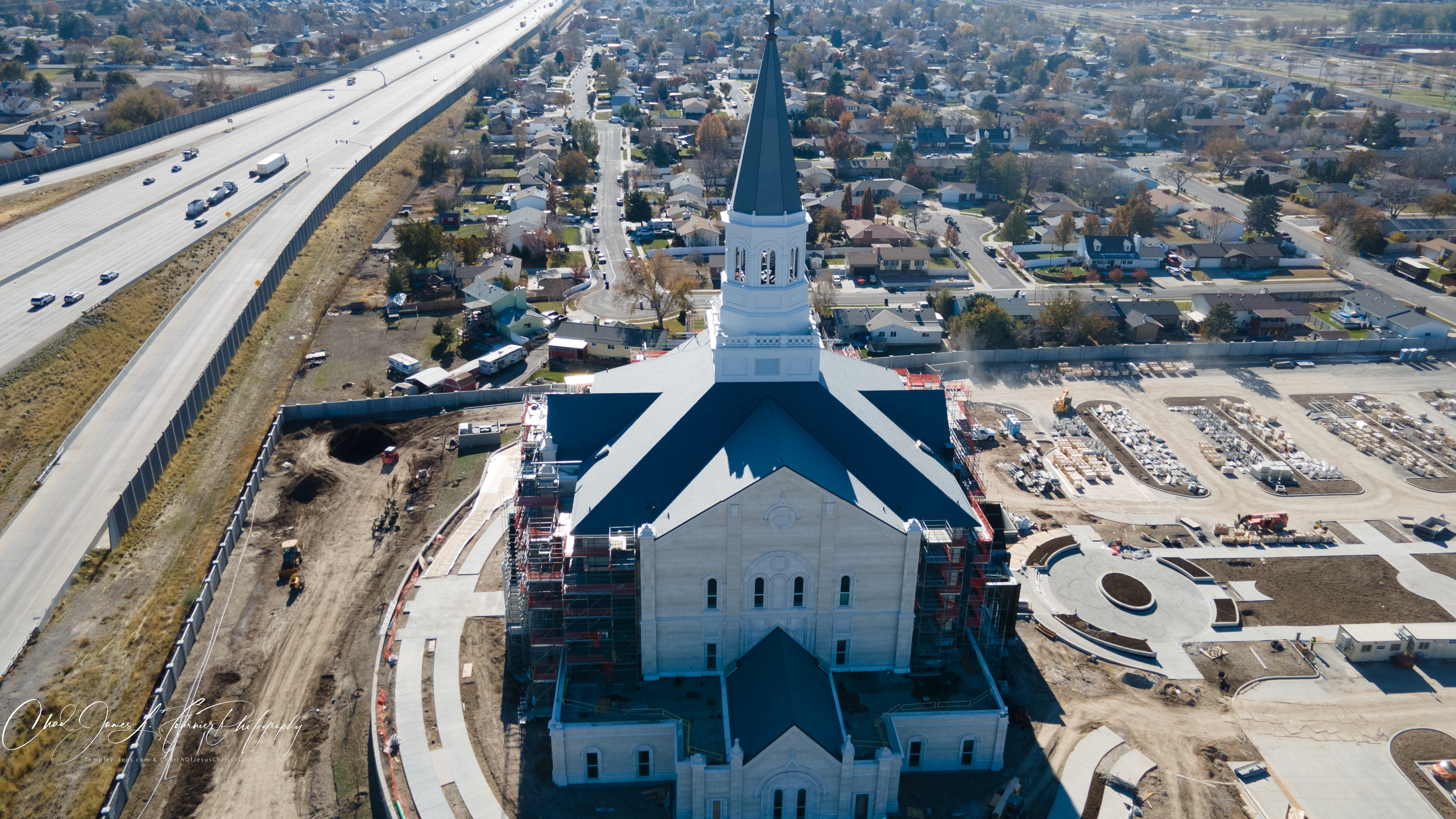
- Interactive map of Taylorsville Utah Temple
- Number: 192
- Dedication: 2 June 2024, by Gerrit W. Gong
- Site: 7.5 acres (3.0 ha)
- Floor area: 73,492 ft^{2} (6,827.6 m^{2})
- Official website • News & images

Church chronology
← Puebla Mexico Temple	Taylorsville Utah Temple	→ Cobán Guatemala Temple

Additional information
- Announced: 5 October 2019, by Russell M. Nelson
- Groundbreaking: 31 October 2020, by Gerrit W. Gong
- Open house: 13 April-18 May 2024
- Location: Taylorsville, Utah, United States
- Baptistries: 1
- Ordinance rooms: 4
- Sealing rooms: 4
- Clothing rental: Yes

The Taylorsville Utah Temple is a temple of the Church of Jesus Christ of Latter-day Saints in Taylorsville, Utah. Plans to construct the temple were announced on October 5, 2019, by church president Russell M. Nelson, during the church's general conference. The temple is the first in the city of Taylorsville, the fifth in Salt Lake County, and the twenty-third in the state of Utah.

A groundbreaking ceremony, to signify beginning of construction, was held on October 31, 2020, with Gerrit W. Gong, of the church's Quorum of the Twelve Apostles, presiding. It was dedicated by Gong on June 2, 2024.

== History ==
The intent to construct the Taylorsville Utah Temple was announced by church president Russell M. Nelson during the women's session of general conference on October 5, 2019. On December 11, 2019, it was announced that the temple would be constructed on the site of an existing meetinghouse at 2603 West 4700 South.

On August 13, 2020, the church announced that the groundbreaking for the temple would be held in October of that year. The groundbreaking ceremony took place on October 31, 2020, marking the commencement of construction. Gerrit W. Gong presided at the ceremony, with a few local church members and community leaders attending, due to the COVID-19 pandemic. The three-story, 70,460-square-foot temple has been constructed on the 7.5-acre site. It was originally anticipated that the temple would be finished in 2023. With construction complete, a public open house was held from April 13 to May 18, 2024 (excluding Sundays) and was dedicated by Gong on June 2, 2024.

== Design and architecture ==
The temple has a distinctive architectural style, blending elements from local pioneer-era architecture with the traditional designs seen in temples made by the church. Designed by FFKR Architects, the temple's architecture reflects both the cultural heritage of Salt Lake City and the spiritual significance of the church.

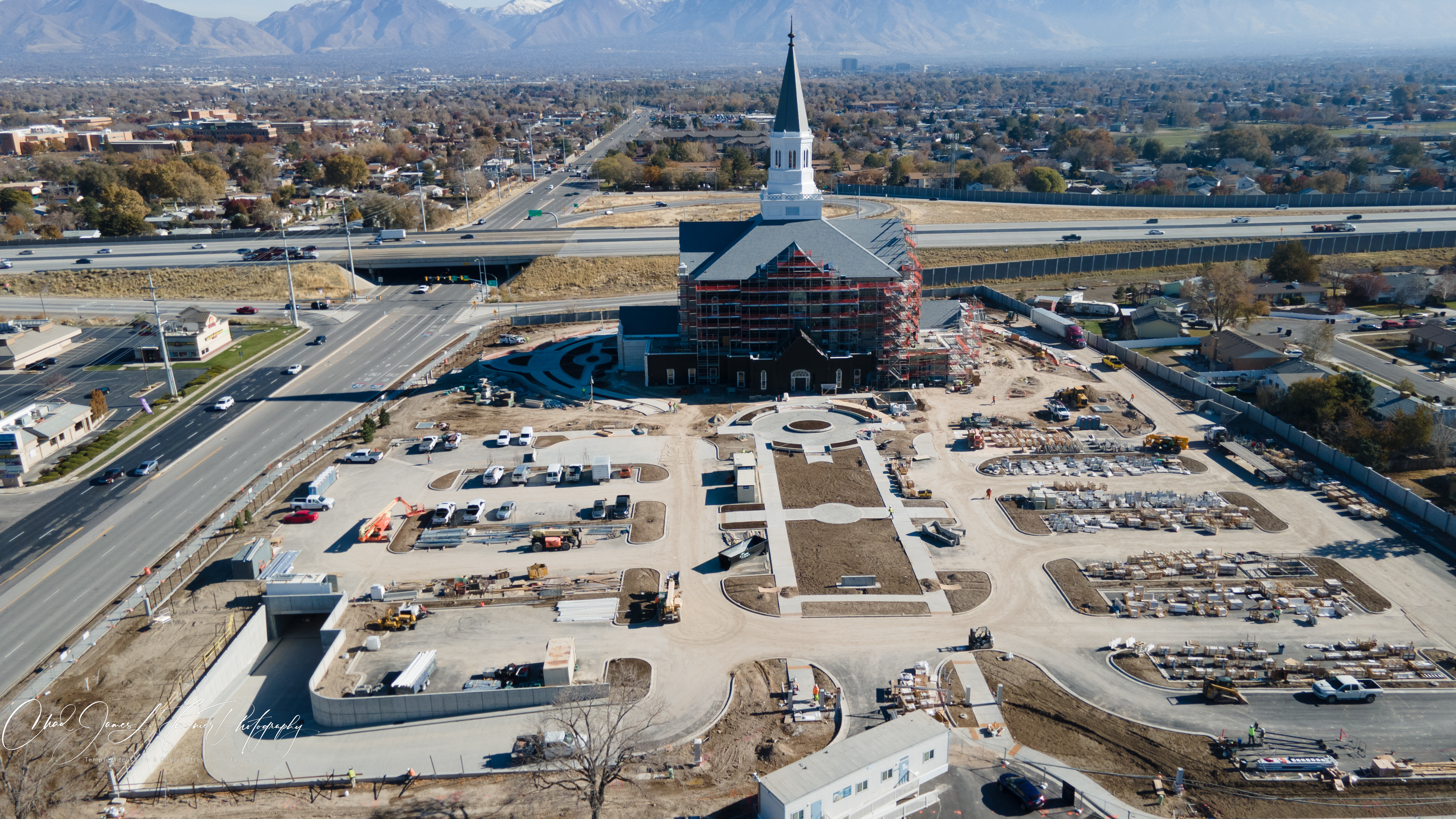
Taylorsville Utah Temple

The temple is constructed with Botticino Classico limestone from Italy. There are two levels of parking, providing both surface and underground parking for attendees. The exterior has a central spire and stone finished in both Seta and Graffiato, providing a contrasting appearance that accentuates its unique features, while the interior consists of high barrel-vaulted ceilings, stained glass, and intricate paintings. The artistic elements of the temple feature local plants like Birdsfoot Trefoil, Red Beauty Bergenia, and Broad Leaf Gilia, presented in art glass, decorative painting, and other detailing found throughout the temple.

One of the focal points of the temple is its single octagonal tower. Its ornamental structure with stained glass detailing and is designed to create a spiritually uplifting atmosphere within the temple. The temple's layout includes four instruction rooms used for the endowment ceremony, four sealing rooms, and a baptistry, each designed for specific ceremonial functions.

The design incorporates symbolic elements inspired by its pioneer heritage, representing both life on Earth and life after death. Symbolism is an important subject to members of the church. The symbols encompass sacred geometries illustrating eternal truths, celestial artwork mirroring heavenly realms, and intricate patterns symbolizing the interconnectedness of the earthly and divine domains. Each symbol holds profound significance within the church's doctrine, giving members a sense of unity, purpose, and divine connection.

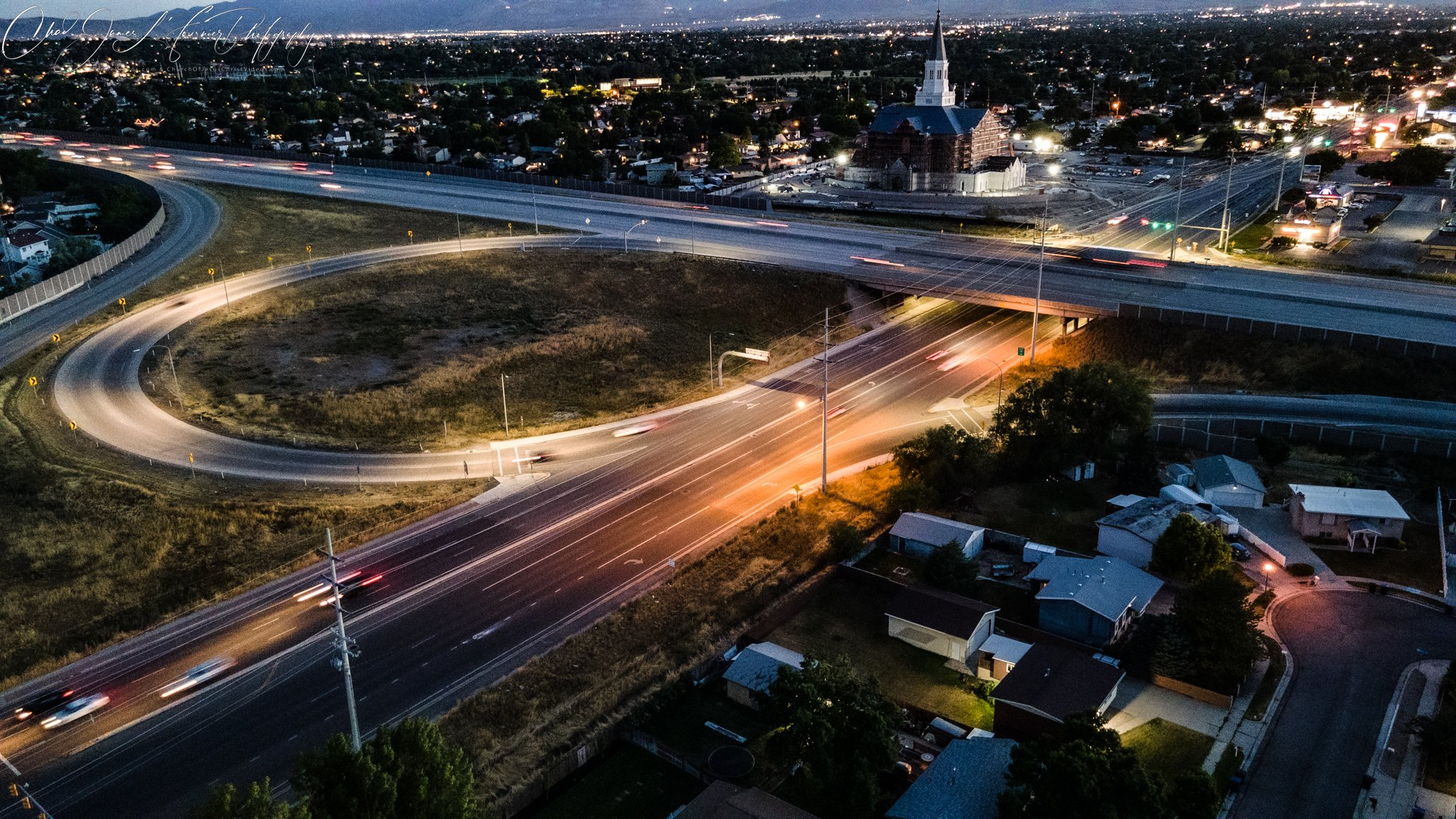
Taylorsville Utah Temple

The landscaping around the temple features flower beds and greenery, various trees, numerous lamp posts, and paved walkways that circle the building, contributing to the artistic and symmetrical patterns that surround the building.

== Admittance and use ==
The temple was dedicated on June 2, 2024, by Gerrit W. Gong and will become a place of worship and spiritual ceremonies for church members. Entry into the dedicated temple is limited to church members who hold a valid temple recommend.

The temple is used for participating in sacred ordinances such as baptisms for the dead, endowment ceremonies, and sealings, each of which are fundamental to the church's doctrine of eternal families and personal salvation.

Before its dedication, a public open house was held from April 13 to May 18, 2024. This enabled individuals of all faiths to experience the temple's architecture and learn about the practices and beliefs of the faith.

== Temple presidents ==
Each temple is overseen by a temple president and matron who supervise all its operations. These married couples typically serve for three years, but time may vary. The initial president and matron of the temple are Kenneth L. DuVall and Mary C. DuVall.

== See also ==
Temples in Utah ()
Wasatch Front Temples
Temples along the Wasatch Front

= Operating
= Under construction
= Announced
= Temporarily Closed

- The Church of Jesus Christ of Latter-day Saints in Utah
- Comparison of temples of The Church of Jesus Christ of Latter-day Saints
- List of temples of The Church of Jesus Christ of Latter-day Saints
- List of temples of The Church of Jesus Christ of Latter-day Saints by geographic region
- Temple architecture (Latter-day Saints)
