= Digistar =

Digitstar
- Industry: Computer animation
- Founded: 1983; 43 years ago

Digistar is the first computer graphics-based planetarium projection and content system. It was designed by Evans & Sutherland and released in 1983. The technology originally focused on accurate and high quality display of stars, including for the first time showing stars from points of view other than Earth's surface, travelling through the stars, and accurately showing celestial bodies from different times in the past and future. Beginning with the Digistar 3 the system now projects full-dome video.

== Projector ==
Unlike modern full-dome systems, which use LCD, DLP, SXRD, or laser projection technology, the Digistar projection system was designed for projecting bright pinpoints of light representing stars. This was accomplished using a calligraphic display, a form of vector graphics, rather than raster graphics. The heart of the Digistar projector is a large cathode-ray tube (CRT). A phosphor plate is mounted atop the tube, and light is then dispersed by a large lens with a 160 degree field of view to cover the planetarium dome. The original lens bore the inscription: "August 1979 mfg. by Lincoln Optical Corp., L.A., CA for Evans and Sutherland Computer Corp., SLC, UT, Digital planetarium CRT projection lens, 43mm, f2.8, 160 degree field of view".

The coordinates of the stars and wire-frame models to be displayed by the projector were stored in computer RAM in a display list. The display would read each set of coordinates in turn and drive the CRT's electron beam directly to those coordinates. If the electron beam was enabled while being moved a line would be painted on the phosphor plate. Otherwise, the electron beam would be enabled once at its destination and a star would be painted. Once all coordinates in the display list had been processed, the display would repeat from the top of the display list.

Thus, the shorter the display list the more frequently the electron beam would refresh the charge on a given point on the phosphor plate, making the projection of the points brighter. In this way, the stars projected by Digistar were substantially brighter than could be achieved using a raster display, which has to touch every point on the phosphor plate before repeating. Likewise, the calligraphic technology allowed Digistar to have a darker black-level than full-dome projectors, since the portions of the phosphor plate representing dark sky were never hit by the electron beam. As it is only one tube, with no pixelated color filter screen, the Digistar projector is monochromatic. The Digistar projects a bright, phosphorescent green, though many (including both visitors and planetarians) report they cannot distinguish between this green and white.

Additionally, unlike a raster display, the calligraphic display is not discretized into pixels, so the displayed stars were a more realistic single spot of light, without the blocky or ropy artifacts that are hard to avoid with raster graphics. Due to the use of vector graphics, as opposed to raster imaging, the Digistar does not have the resolution issues that many full-dome systems have. Thanks to this, and the brightness of the CRT, only one projector is needed to project on the entire dome, whereas most full-dome systems require up to six raster projectors, depending on dome size.

The projector in the original Digistar was housed in a square pyramid-shaped sheathing. When powered on, the four sides at the tip of the pyramid would recede into the housing, exposing the lens and appearing as a cut-off pyramid.

As Digistar II was being developed, many planetaria were sold Digistar LEA projectors. The LEA, called Digistar 1.5 by many users, was effectively a prototype of the D2 projector, compatible with Digistar and upgradable to Digistar II. There are no significant differences in performance between the LEA and the true D2.

== History ==
Digistar was the brainchild of Stephen McAllister and Brent Watson, both of whom were long-time amateur astronomers and computer graphics engineers. In 1977, E&S had been consulting with Johnson Space Center regarding training simulators for astronauts. McAllister had been writing proof-of-concept software for this consultation and in summer 1977 entered the data for 400 bright stars and wrote the software to display them. Steve and Brent both originally saw the system's purpose as celestial navigation training. Brent, who had until recently worked at Hansen planetarium, asked his planetarium coworkers what they thought of a potential digital planetarium system, and then Steve and Brent both targeted the system toward planetaria. The primary goal of the planetarium system was to use computer graphics to overcome the limitation of traditional star ball technology that only allowed display of star fields from the point of view of Earth's surface. By using computer graphics the stars could be displayed from viewpoints in space, including simulating the appearance of space flight. Likewise, planets and moons within the Solar System could be displayed accurately for any time in history, from any point of view. The system used the location of real stars from the Yale Bright Star Catalogue, as well as random stars.

A laboratory prototype of Digistar was used to generate the star fields and tactical displays in the 1982 science fiction film Star Trek II: The Wrath of Khan. Filming was done directly from the Digistar display in the lab. ILM projected the effort would take two weeks, but in fact it took from late November 1981 until mid-February 1982. The last shot recorded was what became the first entirely computer generated feature film sequence. It was the opening scene of the film, a rotating forward translation through a star field that lasted 3.5 minutes. It was recorded in one take, at a rate of one frame every 3.5 seconds, taking four hours for the shoot. The Digistar team members are credited in the film.

After prototyping in labs at Evans and Sutherland the team repeatedly used Salt Lake City's Hansen planetarium to beta test the system at the planetarium at night. The Digistar team performed one week of shows at the planetarium as a fund raiser to benefit the planetarium. The company also later gave the planetarium an improved prototype Digistar to replace "Jake", the planetarium's aging Spitz planetarium projector.

The first customer installation was to the newly constructed Universe Planetarium at the Science Museum of Virginia in 1983, the largest planetarium dome in the world at the time, for $595,000. By September 1986 there were four installed Digistars. Even at this point the long-term success of the product was very much in doubt, but as of 2019 Digistar has an installed base of over 550 planetaria.

=== Versions ===
- Digistar (1983)
- Digistar II (1995)
- Digistar 3 (2002)
- Digistar 4 (2010?)
- Digistar 5 (2012)
- Digistar 6 (2016)
- Digistar 7 (2021)

== Hardware ==
Digistar was driven by a VAX-11/780 minicomputer, with custom graphics hardware related to the E&S Picture System 2. Later versions of Digistar 1 used a DEC MicroVAX 2, driving a custom version of a PS/300.

The original Digistar and Digistar 2 had a physical control panel that was used for running the star shows. This control panel was approximately 3' x 4' and contained a keyboard, a 6 DOF joystick, and a large array of back-lit buttons. One button that was used for moving the viewpoint forward in space was labeled "Boldly Go". Later iterations of Digistar replaced the physical control panel with a common graphical user interface.

Digistar 3 was the first Digistar system to offer full-dome video in 2002, using six projectors. Digistar 4 was able to cover the dome using only two projectors.

== System limitations ==
Though technologically advanced in its day, and the closest system to true full-dome video at the time of its release, the original Digistar and Digistar 2 are limited to only projecting dots and lines—meaning only wireframe models can be projected. To compensate for this, the projector is capable of defocusing specific models, blurring lines and dots together. An example of this is in the Digistar 2's built-in Milky Way model. The model is a circle of parallel lines that, when defocused, appear as the continuous band of the Milky Way across the sky. On more complex models, especially three-dimensional ones, brightness and details may be lost in this process, so it is not useful in all situations.

The Digistar and Digistar 2 also suffer focus limitations. Because they use a single lens to cover the entire dome, it is difficult to gain perfect focus across the dome. Coupled with this, stars greater than a certain brightness are "multihit" points, meaning the projector draws two dots at the given position to accommodate the brightness of the star. Errors in the projector can lead the second dot to be slightly out-of-place with the first one. These two issues together, along with other issues that can occur within the projector's focus system, give the stars a blobby look. Some planetarians, used to the pinpoint opto-mechanical projector stars ubiquitous in the day, rejected the Digistar and Digistar 2 because of this, ignoring the other advantages of the system.

The CRT in the Digistar and Digistar 2 begins to burn out and lose brightness after roughly 1000 hours of use. This means most planetariums must change out the tube after every year or year-and-a-half.

== File types ==
While the original Digistar ran on large VAX computers, Digistar II runs on the much more compact and advanced Sun Microsystems SPARCstation 5. D2 uses two primary file types, .vl and .sf. .vl files are binary model files, while .sf files are binary show data files. Model files contain vector, line and dot data, as well as parametric changes to data within the file. Show files contain commands to the system, regarding the manipulation of the observer and models declared within the file. Several show files are often strung together underneath each other in show production. Both .vl and .sf have ASCII equivalents for editing--.vla and .sfa respectively. These are converted to their binary equivalents by a utility built into the Digistar system, which also checks for errors within the file. Digistar II show files are programmed in a language related to Pascal.

Further, Digistar II can run animation files, .af, with the ASCII format .afa. An animation file consists of several model files, grouped together and loaded as one object. The Digistar II can either select frames individually, or animate the entire file.

Digistar II is able to convert Digistar show and model files. Similarly, Digistar 3 can convert Digistar II model files, though it cannot, at this time, convert show files.

== Popularity ==
Despite its limits, the original Digistar was well received by many planetarians, and has been distributed worldwide. Though it lacked the pin-point stars of opto-mechanical projectors, and the full-dome rendering abilities of the later Digistar 3, many planetarians consider it a good balance between the two, especially considering the novel capabilities of seeing heavenly bodies from any point in space and time. The Digistar line has an installed base of over 550 planetaria as of 2019.

Terence Murtagh, past president of the International Planetarium Society, stated in 2000, anticipating Digistar 3's full-dome video, "I think the next ten years will see the most dramatic advances in all-dome presentations since the invention of the projection planetarium in the 1920s and the arrival of the electronic Digistar in the 1980s."

The Digistar Users Group has been operating since the mid-1980s and consists of several hundred facilities that have installed Digistar systems.
