= Walter Gong =

American academic

- Born: July 1, 1922; Merced, California, U.S.
- Died: May 16, 2000 (aged 77); Palo Alto, California, U.S.
- Spouse: Jean Char
- Children: 3, including Gerrit W. Gong

Academic background
- Education: Stanford University (BA, MA, PhD)

Military service
- Branch/service: United States Navy
- Battles/wars: World War II

Walter Gong (July 1, 1922 – May 16, 2000) was an American academic and educational theorist who worked as a professor of natural sciences at San Jose State University (SJSU) and Brigham Young University (BYU).

== Early life and education ==
Gong was born and raised in Merced, California. His ancestors came to the United States from China, near the end of the 19th century. His family was involved in the laundry and grocery business. He served in the United States Navy during World War II. While serving in the Navy, he chose to use the first name of Walter.

Gong attended Stanford University, where he earned bachelor's, master's, and Ph.D. degrees. There, he met Jean Char, who introduced him to the Church of Jesus Christ of Latter-day Saints (LDS Church) and whom he later married.

== Career ==
Gong began his teaching career at Sequoia High School in Redwood City, California. He was a professor at SJSU from 1959 to 1993. Gong co-authored a book on mechanics with William Shockley. In the late-1970s, Gong was a professor at BYU. He also taught at Ricks College and did teaching work with IBM and NASA. As a professor of physics at SJSU he developed an innovative learning approach while teaching an eight-credit natural science course: Learning and teaching: A Paradigm for Content Mastery. Based on his success at SJSU he was invited to teach faculty member of BYU his approach to teaching and learning.

== Personal life ==
Gong and his wife, Jean, had three children. In the LDS Church, Gong served as a patriarch. Their eldest son, Gerrit W. Gong, is a church general authority and current member of the Quorum of the Twelve Apostles. On May 16, 2000, Gong died at age 77 from complications of diabetes.
