= David C. Evans (computer scientist) =

American computer scientist

- Born: David Cannon Evans; February 24, 1924; Salt Lake City, Utah, United States
- Died: October 3, 1998 (aged 74); Salt Lake City, Utah, United States
- Education: University of Utah
- Known for: Computer graphics
- Spouse: Beverly Joy Frewin Evans
- Children: 10, including David F. Evans
- Awards: IEEE Emanuel R. Piore Award (1986)
- Scientific career
- Workplaces: University of California, Berkeley; University of Utah; Evans & Sutherland
- Thesis: Design and Operation of Two Electronic Computing Devices (1953)
- Doctoral students: Alan Kay

David Cannon Evans (February 24, 1924 – October 3, 1998) was the founder of the computer science department at the University of Utah and co-founder (with Ivan Sutherland) of Evans & Sutherland, a pioneering firm in computer graphics hardware.

== Early life and education ==
Evans was born in Salt Lake City in 1924. He attended the University of Utah, studied electrical engineering, and earned his Bachelor of Science in physics in 1949 and his Doctorate in Physics in 1953.

== Career ==
Evans began his career at Bendix Aviation Electronics after graduating in 1953. The Bendix G-15 was a bulky unit about the size of a two-door refrigerator. He stayed with the company just long enough to manage the G-20 project.

Evans became a faculty member of the University of California, Berkeley. His first important work with graphics dates from that period, when he did several experiments on an IDIOM display hooked up to a Digital Equipment Corporation PDP-5. He joined the faculty at the University of Utah in 1962. In 1963, he was co-Principal Investigator (with Harry Huskey) for project Genie to produce an early multi-user timesharing system. Students from this period include Butler Lampson and L. Peter Deutsch. The system, which included key developments in the field of virtual memory, was sponsored by the US Defense Department's Advanced Research Projects Agency.

In 1965, the University of Utah recruited him back to start their own computer science department. In 1968, Ivan Sutherland co-founded Evans & Sutherland Computer Corporation, a computer research company.

Evans was awarded the Silver Beaver for his role in scouting.

== Personal life ==
Evans married Joy Frewin in 1947, and they had seven children. Evans died in 1998 at age 74.

In 1996, Brigham Young University established the David C. Evans Chair of Computer Engineering and Graphics.

Evans was awarded the 1996 Computer World-Smithsonian Award for lifetime achievement.
