= Robert C. Gay =

American Mormon leader

First Quorum of the Seventy
- March 31, 2012
- Called by: Thomas S. Monson

Presidency of the Seventy
- March 31, 2018
- Called by: Russell M. Nelson
- Reason: Gerrit W. Gong and Ulisses Soares added to the Quorum of the Twelve Apostles

Personal details
- Born: Robert Christopher Gay; September 1, 1951 (age 75); Los Angeles, California, United States

Robert Christopher "Bob" Gay (born September 1, 1951) has been a general authority of the Church of Jesus Christ of Latter-day Saints (LDS Church) since 2012. He has been a member of the church's Presidency of the Seventy since March 2018. Prior to becoming a general authority, Gay was the managing director, co-founder, and chief executive officer of Huntsman Gay Global Capital (HGGC), a private equity firm headquartered in Palo Alto, California, with offices in Florida, Massachusetts, and Utah.

== Early life and family ==
Gay was born in Los Angeles, California, to Frank William Gay, an American executive who oversaw several entities for Howard Hughes, and Mary Elizabeth Thain Gay. As a young man, Gay served as an LDS Church missionary in Spain. He married Lynette Nielsen and they are the parents of seven children. He graduated with a degree in economics from the University of Utah.

== Career ==
Gay was the managing director, co-founder, and CEO of HGGC. Under his leadership the company invested more than $1.1 billion.

Prior to this, he was a managing director for sixteen years at Bain Capital. Prior to working at Bain, Gay was an executive vice president of General Electric Credit Corporation Capital Markets Group, a vice president in the Merchant Banking Group at Kidder Peabody, and an engagement manager at the international consulting firm McKinsey & Company.

In 2001, Gay joined with Steve Young and Rich Lawson in co-founding Sorenson Capital. Later, with the founding of HGGC, Lawson and Young were key in setting up the company. In 2011, Gay was the commencement keynote speaker at Utah Valley University.

== Poverty relief work ==
Gay has been actively involved in poverty relief and humanitarian aid in developing countries, serving as a co-founder (primarily with his wife, Lynette) of the Brigham Young University Center for Economic Self Reliance. Gay has been a major contributor to this center, now named the Melvin J. Ballard Center for Economic Self-Reliance. He has served on the board of trustees and as an advisor of the Forever Young Foundation, founded by NFL Hall of Fame quarterback Steve Young. He has also served as an advisory board member of Ascend Alliance, and is the founder of the Komart Foundation in Ghana. Gay taught economics at Harvard University for two years, where he also received a Ph.D. in business economics in 1982. He graduated Phi Beta Kappa with an AB from the University of Utah.

In 2001, Gay co-founded Unitus (renamed to Unitus Labs in 2011), a global micro-credit company. Unitus received the Fast Company/Monitor Group Social Capitalist award naming three times, which recognizes the top 45 social capital companies in the United States.

== LDS Church service ==
In the late 1970s, Gay served on the high council of the Boston Stake, while Richard L. Bushman was stake president. This is where he first met Mitt Romney.

From 2004 to 2007, Gay was president of the church's Ghana Accra Mission, with responsibilities including the oversight of missionary work in all parts of Ghana, Sierra Leone, and Liberia. Gay was appointed an area seventy in April 2008. Gay also served previously as a counselor in a bishopric.

On March 31, 2012, he was called as a member of the First Quorum of the Seventy. In September 2012, Gay was named as chairman of the Perpetual Education Fund. During the church's April 2018 general conference, Gay was appointed to the Presidency of the Seventy. This assignment, along with that of Carl B. Cook, was the result of Gerrit W. Gong and Ulisses Soares being called to the Quorum of the Twelve Apostles In 2019, he toured India as part of an LDS Church delegation led by M. Russell Ballard.
