= Flood gun =

A flood gun is an electromechanical device that provides a steady flow of low-energy electrons to a desired target or "flood area".

Typically, the target is an area on an insulator or semiconductor where another "writing gun" has just left a net positive charge.

If the energy of a flood gun's electrons is properly balanced, each impinging flood gun electron knocks out one secondary electron from the target, thus preserving the net charge in the target area. This is called "charge neutralization".

Flood guns are typically used in photoelectron spectroscopy, oscilloscopes and ion beam implanters as their secondary electron gun.
