= Line Drawing System-1 =

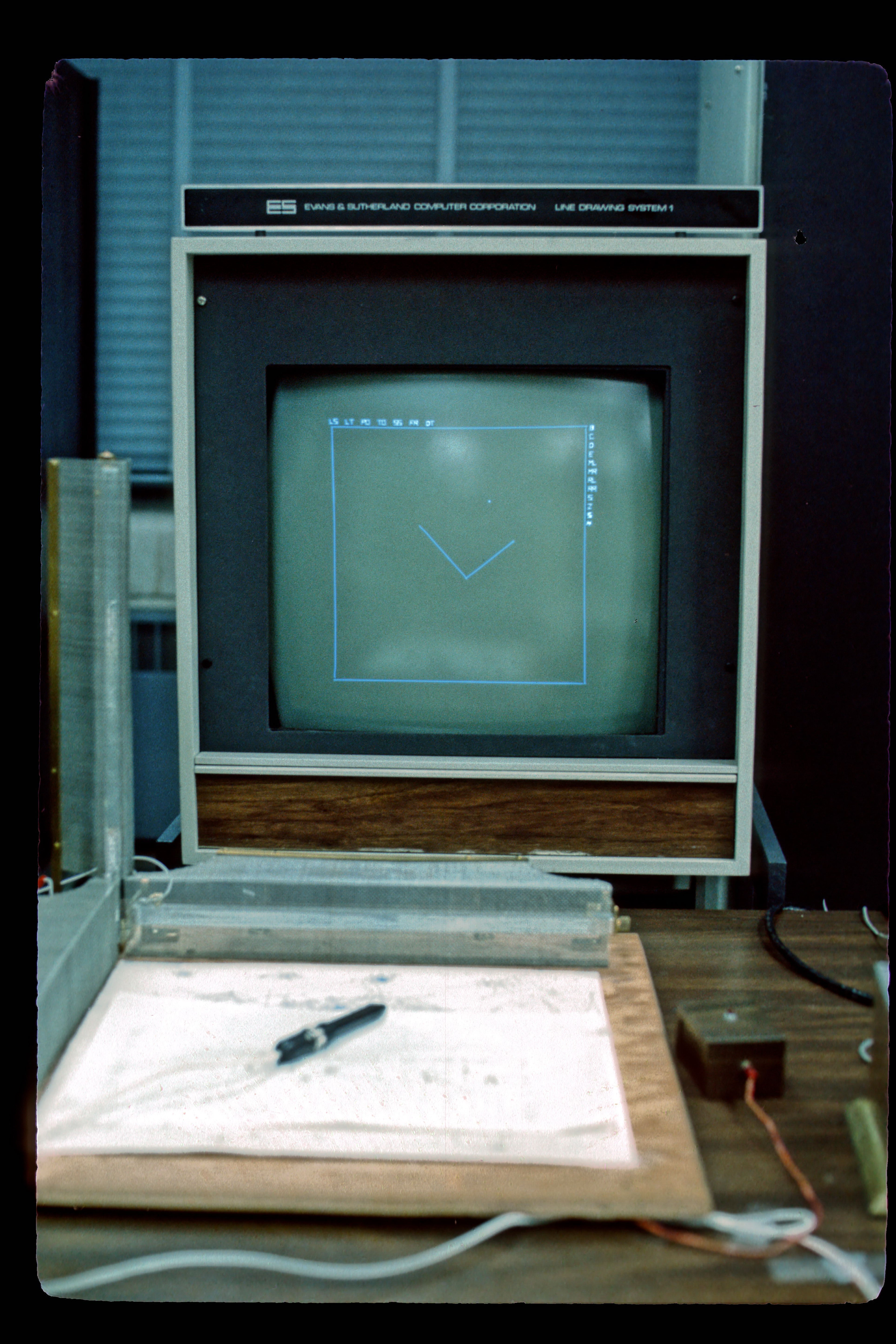
LDS-1

LDS-1 (Line Drawing System-1) was a calligraphic (vector, rather than raster) display processor and display device created by Evans & Sutherland in 1969. This model was known as the first graphics device with a graphics processing unit.

== Features ==
Block diagram of Evans and Sutherland Line Drawing System 1

It was controlled by a variety of host computers. Straight lines were smoothly rendered in real-time animation. General principles of operation were similar to the systems used today: 4x4 transformation matrices, 1x4 vertices. Possible uses included flight simulation (in the product brochure there are screenshots of landing on a carrier), scientific imaging and GIS systems.

== History ==
The first LDS-1 was shipped to the customer (BBN) in August 1969. Only a few of these systems were ever built. One was used by the Los Angeles Times as their first typesetting/layout computer. One went to NASA Ames Research Center for Human Factors Research. Another was bought by the Port Authority of New York to develop a tugboat pilot trainer for navigation in the harbor. The MIT Dynamic Modeling had one, and there was a program for viewing an ongoing game of Maze War.

== See also ==
- Case Western Reserve University § Computing, where Project Logos had an LDS-1.

== See also ==
- Vector General
- SuperPaint
