= Gerrit W. Gong =

American religious leader

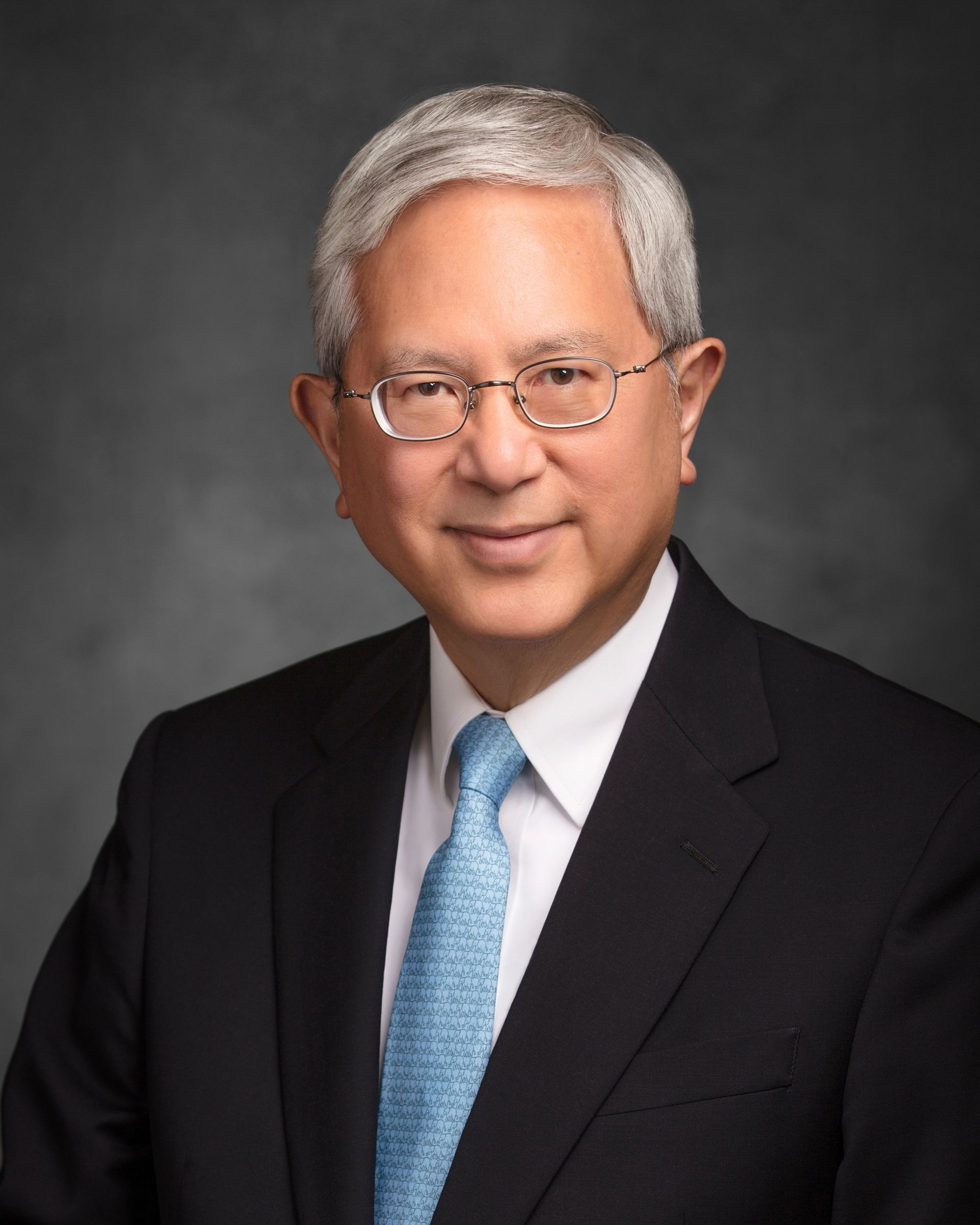
- Gong in 2018

Quorum of the Twelve Apostles
- March 31, 2018
- Called by: Russell M. Nelson

LDS Church Apostle
- April 5, 2018
- Called by: Russell M. Nelson
- Reason: Death of Robert D. Hales

Presidency of the Seventy
- October 6, 2015 – March 31, 2018
- Called by: Thomas S. Monson
- End reason: Called to the Quorum of the Twelve Apostles

First Quorum of the Seventy
- April 3, 2010 – March 31, 2018
- Called by: Thomas S. Monson
- End reason: Called to the Quorum of the Twelve Apostles

Personal details
- Born: Gerrit Walter Gong; December 23, 1953 (age 72); Redwood City, California, United States
- Alma mater: Brigham Young University (BA); University of Oxford (MA, DPhil)
- Spouse(s): Susan Lindsay (1980–present)
- Children: 4
- Parents: Walter Gong and Jean Char

Gerrit W. Gong
- Traditional Chinese: 江文漢
- Simplified Chinese: 江文汉
Transcriptions
Standard Mandarin
- Hanyu Pinyin: Jiāng Wénhàn
- Wade–Giles: Chiang^{1} Wen^{2}-han^{4}
Yue: Cantonese
- Jyutping: Gong^{1} Mon^{4}-hon^{3}
- IPA: [kɔŋ˥ mɔn˩.hɔn˧]

Gerrit Walter Gong (born December 23, 1953) is an American religious leader and former academic serving as a member of the Quorum of the Twelve Apostles of the Church of Jesus Christ of Latter-day Saints (LDS Church). He has been a general authority since 2010 and served as a member of the church's Presidency of the Seventy from October 2015 until his calling to the Quorum of the Twelve in March 2018. He is the LDS Church's first apostle of Asian (Chinese) descent. Prior to becoming a general authority, he served as assistant to the president of Brigham Young University (BYU) for planning and assessment. As a member of the Quorum of the Twelve Apostles, Gong is accepted by the church as a prophet, seer, and revelator. Currently, he is the eleventh most senior apostle in the church.

== Biography ==
=== Early life and education ===
Gong was born in 1953 in Redwood City, California, to Walter Gong and his wife, the former Jean Char, and raised in Palo Alto, California. Gerrit was named after Gerrit de Jong because his mother had lived with de Jong and his family while she was a student at BYU. He had a close almost familial relationship with de Jong and would refer to him as "Grandpa de Jong." His mother's family are ethnic Chinese in Hawaii, and his father's family lived in California and other parts of the United States after his ancestors emigrated from China in the late 19th century. During a press conference related to the open house for the rededication of the Washington D.C. Temple, Gong shared that one of his first memories was of being sealed to his parents in a temple of the LDS Church.

Gong graduated from Cubberley High School in Palo Alto, California, in 1971. He served as an LDS Church missionary in Taiwan. He graduated from BYU in 1977 with a Bachelor of Arts, summa cum laude. He received a Rhodes Scholarship, which he used to study international relations at the University of Oxford, receiving a master's degree in 1979 and a D.Phil. in 1980.

In 1985, Gong became a special assistant to the U.S. secretary of state. Gong was a professor at various times at Georgetown University and Johns Hopkins University. He later served as a special assistant in the United States State Department, as well as special assistant to the ambassador at the United States Embassy in Beijing, China. He also held the Freeman Chair in China studies and was later the Asia Director of the Center for Strategic and International Studies. He joined this latter institution in 1989. From at least 2002, Gong served as special assistant to the president of BYU for planning and assessment.

Even before joining the administration at BYU, Gong was involved in educational policy issues. He served as a member of the United States Department of Education's National Advisory Committee on Institutional Quality and Integrity and participated in multiple national education summits.

=== Marriage and family ===
Gong is married to Susan Lindsay, a daughter of Richard P. Lindsay. Susan is white, making Gong the first member of the Quorum of the Twelve Apostles in a multi-racial marriage. They first met when Gong was a BYU student who would give presentations on Taiwan's culture to missionaries about to depart for Taiwan from the Missionary Training Center, among whom was Lindsay. They began dating a few years later, in the summer when Gong had returned from Oxford to spend a few weeks with his parents, during a time his father was a BYU professor. They continued their courtship after Gong returned to Oxford while Lindsay continued her studies at BYU, which has led to Gong's humorously asserting that there is no question he got a degree in international relations. The Gongs married in the Salt Lake Temple on January 4, 1980. Their marriage was performed by apostle David B. Haight, who had connections to their families from his time in California. (Haight had helped to overcome some of the misgivings some family members had about the interracial marriage.) Gong and his wife are the parents of four sons. Prior to joining the BYU administration, the Gongs had spent most of their married life in Maryland and Virginia.

== LDS Church service ==
Prior to becoming a general authority, Gong served in the church as a stake Sunday School president, high councilor, seminary teacher, bishop, stake president, and area seventy. After his call to the First Quorum of the Seventy, he served as a counselor in the church's Asia Area from 2011 to 2013, then as the area's president from August 2013 until the end of 2015. Among other activities while Gong was president of the Asia Area, he created the second and third stakes in Thailand. While in the presidency of the Asia Area, Gong resided in Hong Kong but supervised the work of the LDS Church in all of continental East Asia except Korea, Taiwan, and all of Southeast Asia, except the Philippines and south Asia.

In October 2015, Gong was appointed to the Presidency of the Seventy, filling a vacancy created by Ronald A. Rasband's call to the Quorum of the Twelve Apostles. Effective January 4, 2016, Gong transitioned from his role as president of the Asia Area and into the Presidency of the Seventy, with responsibility for the church's North America Northeast Area. Among his assignments while in the Presidency of the Seventy, Gong served on the Church Board of Education and Boards of Trustees, where he also served as a member of its executive committee. He also on occasion continued to travel to Asia, such as being present for the official recognition of the LDS Church in Vietnam.

=== Quorum of the Twelve ===
On March 31, 2018, Gong was sustained as a member of the Quorum of the Twelve Apostles. He and Ulisses Soares filled the vacancies created from the deaths of Thomas S. Monson and Robert D. Hales.

In May 2018, Gong and his wife spoke at the BYU Women's Conference. As of June 2018, he was serving as chair of the church's Scriptures Committee (which, among other things, oversees the translation of the scriptures) and as a member of the Leadership and Training Committee, the Priesthood and Family Executive Council, and the Outreach Committee. He also has responsibility in the Quorum of the Twelve for the church's Asia and Asia North areas.

In May 2019, Gong and his wife accompanied Russell M. Nelson and his wife on a ministry tour to the Pacific region. They visited Samoa, Australia, New Zealand, Tonga, and Fiji, including meeting with government leaders of New Zealand and Tonga.

In November 2019, Gong presided over a worldwide broadcast that announced the LDS Church's new youth program.

In early 2020, the church announced that Gong would preside at the November dedication of the Winnipeg Manitoba Temple, originally set to occur in mid-November. That was later postponed indefinitely as a result of the COVID-19 pandemic. The church later announced that Gong, whose wife has ties to Taylorsville, Utah, would preside at the October 2020 groundbreaking for the temple in that city. Gong dedicated the Taylorsville Utah Temple on 2 June 2024.

==== COVID-19 ====
During the church's general conference in October 2020, it was announced that Gong and his wife had been exposed to COVID-19, and that his address had been pre-recorded as he quarantined at home. A few days later, the church announced that he and his wife had tested positive for COVID-19, with Gong being the first high-ranking LDS Church leader with a positive test. On October 16, the church announced that he and his wife had successfully completed their quarantines, and that Gong had been cleared by his doctors to resume his regular assignments the following week.

== Publications ==
- "Reconceptualising the Divide: Identity, Memory, and Nationalism in Sino-Japanese Relations" (with Victor Teo)
- "Remembering and Forgetting: The Legacy of War and Peace in East Asia"
- "Memory and History in East and Southeast Asia: Issues of Identity in International Relations"
- "Security and Economics in the Asia-Pacific Region" (with Richard L. Grant)
- "Taiwan Strait Dilemmas : China-Taiwan-U.S. Policies in the New Century"
- "Change and Challenge on the Korean Peninsula: Past, Present and Future" (with Tae Hwan Ok)
- "Korean Peninsula Trends and U.S.-Japan-South Korea Relations" (with Seizaburo Sato)
- "Sino-American Relations at a Time of Change" (with Bih-Jaw Lin)
- "Areas of Challenge for Soviet Foreign Policy in the 1980s"
- "The Standard of 'Civilization' in International Society"

The Church of Jesus Christ of Latter-day Saints titles
Preceded by Dale G. Renlund	Quorum of the Twelve Apostles; March 31, 2018 –	Succeeded by Ulisses Soares
