= Evans & Sutherland =

American computer graphics company

Evans and Sutherland Computer Corporation
- Type: Private
- Founded: 1968 in Salt Lake City, Utah
- Founders: David Evans, Ivan Sutherland
- Headquarters: Salt Lake City, Utah, United States
- Revenue: ▲US$9.359 million (2020)
- Owner: Cosm
- Number of employees: ~96 (2020)
- Website: www.es.com

Evans & Sutherland is an American computer graphics firm founded in 1968 by David Evans and Ivan Sutherland. Its current products are used in digital projection environments like planetariums. Its simulation business, which it sold to Rockwell Collins, sold products that were used primarily by the military and large industrial firms for training and simulation.

== History ==
First Evans & Sutherland logo mark

The company was founded in 1968 by David C. Evans and Ivan Sutherland, professors in the Computer Science Department at the University of Utah and pioneers in computer graphics technology. They formed the company to produce hardware to run the systems being developed in the university, working from an abandoned barracks on the university grounds. The company was later housed in the University of Utah Research Park. Most of the employees were active or former students, and included Jim Clark, who started Silicon Graphics, Ed Catmull, co-founder of Pixar, and John Warnock, founder of Adobe.

In the early 1970s they purchased General Electric's flight simulator division and formed a partnership with Rediffusion Simulation, a UK-based flight simulator company, to design and build digital flight simulators. For the next three decades this was E&S's primary market, delivering display systems with enough brightness to light up a simulator cockpit to daytime light levels. These simulators were used for training in in-flight refueling, carrier landing, AWACS, and B52.

Later in the 1970s the company expanded their line of simulation systems, first building a five-projector graphics system to simulate a ship steaming into New York Harbor and through its surroundings. This graphics system was installed on the mock-up of a ship's bridge and used to train ship's pilots how to navigate into and out of New York Harbor. The project, called CAORF (Computer Aided Operations Research Facility), was built for the US Maritime Academy. The project paved the way for other visual simulation systems including a NASA Space Shuttle manipulator arm, EVS, submarine periscope and space station docking simulators.

Starting in 1969, E&S produced the LDS-1 (Line Drawing System-1), and later the Picture System 1, 2 and PS300 series. These unique "calligraphic" (analog vector drawing) color displays had depth cueing and could draw large wireframe models and manipulate (rotate, shift, zoom) them in real time. They were used both in chemistry by pharmaceutical companies to visualize large molecules such as enzymes or polynucleotides, and by aerospace companies, such as Boeing, McDonnell-Douglas and others, to design aircraft.

The Evans & Sutherland Shaded Picture System was introduced in 1973, and was the first commercially available product capable of producing real-time, shaded hidden-line 3D graphics. It was extremely expensive and could only produce black-and-white images at a resolution of 256x256.

The end of the Picture System line came in the late 1980s, when raster devices on workstations could render anti-aliased lines faster.

In 1978 the company went public with a listing on NASDAQ.

In the 1980s E&S added a Digital Theater division, supplying all-digital projectors to create immersive mass-audience experiences at planetariums, visitor attractions and similar education and entertainment venues. Digital Theater grew to become a major arm of E&S commercial activity with hundreds of Digistar 1 and 2 systems installed around the world, such as at the Saint Louis Science Center in St. Louis, Missouri.

In the mid-1980s Evans & Sutherland introduced a geometric modeling system called CDRS, that provided high quality surface design capabilities together with a photo-realistic rendering system. CDRS was sold to many well known manufacturers including both Ford & Chrysler. CDRS was acquired by Parametric Technology Corporation in 1995.

For a brief period between 1986 and 1989 E&S was also a supercomputer vendor, but their ES-1 was released just as the supercomputer market was drying up in the post-Cold War military wind-down. Only a handful of machines were built, most broken up for scrap. One sample ES-1 is in storage at the Computer History Museum.

During the 1990s E&S tried to expand into several other commercial markets. The Freedom Series graphics engine was developed to work with Sun Microsystems, IBM, Hewlett-Packard, and DEC workstations. 3D Pro technology was developed for the first wave of 3D graphics cards for PCs. Also, the MindSet virtual set system was created to address the needs of the broadcast video market.

In 1993 Evans and Sutherland helped Japanese arcade giant Namco with texture-mapping technology in Namco's System 22 arcade board that powered Ridge Racer. The help that E&S gave Namco was similar to the help that Martin Marietta gave Sega with the MODEL 2 board that powered Daytona USA and Desert Tank arcade games.

In 1998 Evans and Sutherland acquired AccelGraphics Inc, a manufacturer of computer graphics boards, for $52m.

Since its launch in July 2002, the company's Digistar 3 system became the world's fastest selling Digital Theater system and is installed in upwards of 120 fulldome venues worldwide.

On May 9, 2006, Evans & Sutherland acquired Spitz Inc, a rival vendor in the planetarium market, giving the combined business the largest base of installed planetaria worldwide and adding in-house projection-dome manufacturing capability to E&S' offering.

In 2006 Evans and Sutherland sold its simulation business, which for decades was the core of the company, to Rockwell Collins.

On February 10, 2020, Elevate Entertainment (later renamed Cosm) and Evans & Sutherland announced that Elevate would purchase E&S for $1.19 per share in cash in a transaction valued at $14,500,000.

== Use in movies and special effects ==
The Evans & Sutherland Picture System (PS2) was used extensively in the 1982 science fiction movie, Tron. The PS2 was a high-resolution vector graphics machine capable of drawing in real time on a CRT screen. Several of the machines were used by special effects production house, Robert Abel and Associates. Technicians at Abel built computer-controlled 35mm cameras which interfaced with the PS2 and recorded the images directly from the CRT screen. Initially, Robert Abel and his staff had found ways to use an Evans & Sutherland flight simulator to present a simple wireframe version of what was to be photographed later by a motion-control camera. They later added colored filters and used multiple exposures to photograph the E&S machine's output as final art.

An Evans & Sutherland computer was used in the creation of the Project Genesis simulation sequence in Star Trek II: The Wrath of Khan (1982). The star fields, and the tactical bridge displays on the Kobayashi Maru simulator and USS Enterprise were created by Evans & Sutherland employees and filmed directly from the screen of a prototype Digistar system at company headquarters. This film was one of the first ever to use computer graphics (after Futureworld in 1976). Star fields and some of the other shots were reused in Star Trek III: The Search for Spock (1984) and later films.

NBC would later use an Evans & Sutherland Picture System for its 1984–1985 promotional campaign "Let's All Be There!", as well as subsequent campaigns, concluding with the 1989–1990 season promotional campaign "Come Home to the Best!".

== Products ==
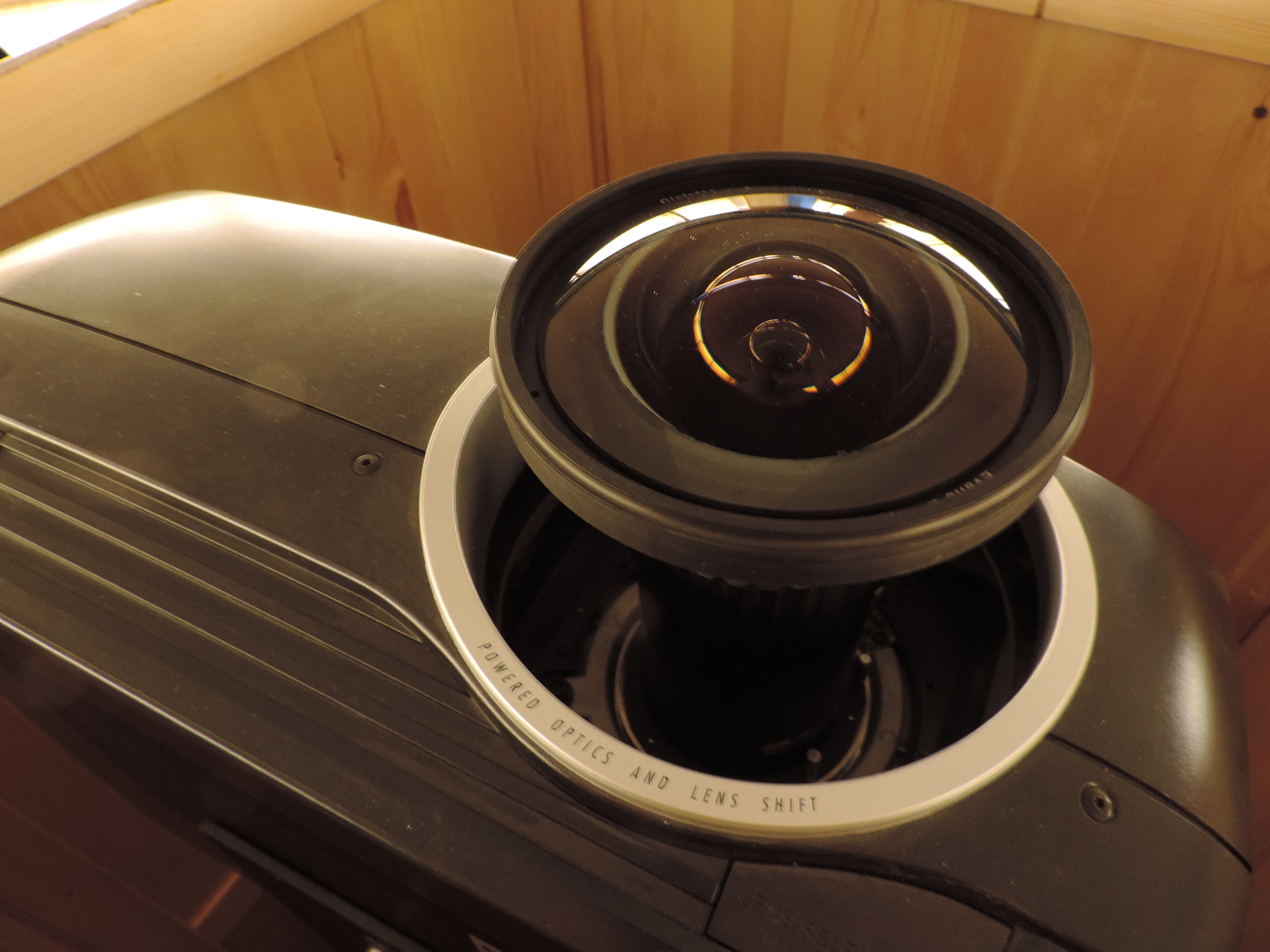
The "fisheye" lens of the E&S planetarium projector in the Plovdiv Regional Natural History Museum, Plovdiv, January 2016

=== Terminals ===
- LDS-1 (Line Drawing System-1)
- LDS-2 (Line Drawing System-2)
- Picture System
- Picture System 2
- Shaded Picture System (first commercially available real-time shaded 3D rendering machine)
- PS/300 Picture System (variations included PS/340 which could render a still frame image using an internal framebuffer)
- PS/390 Picture System/390 (first to use a raster scan display as the primary monitor)

=== Workstations ===
- VAXstation 8000

(Co-developed graphics accelerator with DEC)

- ESV/3
- ESV/10
- ESV/50

=== Accelerators ===
- Freedom series

=== Simulation image generators ===
- Novoview SP1 and SP2 (the 6000 light systems)
- SP3/T (incorporated texture mapping)
- SPX
- CT5
- ESIG-2000
- ESIG-3000
- ESIG-4000
- Harmony
- EPX

=== Simulation display products ===
- CSM (Calligraphic Shadowmask Monitor)
- VistaView head-tracked projector
- TargetView
- TargetView 200
- ESCP raster/calligraphic projector

=== Planetarium products ===
- Digistar (1983)
- Digistar II (1995)
- Digistar 3 (2002)
- Digistar 4 (2008)
- Digistar 5 (2012)
- Digistar 6 (2016)
- Digistar 7 (2020)

=== Supercomputers ===
- ES-1
