= List of arcade video games: S =

This is a list of arcade video games organized alphabetically by name. It does not include PC or console games unless they were also released in video arcades. See Lists of video games for related lists.

== Released games ==
Title	Alternate Title(s)	Year	Manufacturer	Genre(s)	Max. Players	PCB Model
S.C.I. - Special Criminal Investigation	—	1989	Taito			
S.O.S.	—	1988	Terminal			
S.P.Y.- Special Project Y	Espionage^{JP}	1989	Konami	Run and gun	2	
S.R.D. Mission	—	1986	Taito	Scrolling shooter	2	Kyugo
S.S. Mission	—	1992	Comad	Scrolling shooter	2	
S.T.U.N. Runner	—	1989	Atari Games	Racing	1	
Saboten Bombers	—	1992	Tecmo	Action, Platformer	2	
Sadari	—	1993	NTC			
Safari	—	1977	Gremlin / Taito			
Safari Rally	—	1979	SNK			
Saikyu Saisoku Battle Racer	—	2009	Sega	Racing	2	
Saint Dragon	Tenseiryuu ^{JP}	1989	Jaleco	Scrolling shooter	2	
Salamander	Lifeforce	1986	Konami	Scrolling shooter	2	
Salamander 2	—	1996	Konami	Scrolling shooter	2	
Salaryman Champ	—	2001	Konami			
Salter Fitness: Pro Cycle Tele Cardioline	—	1997	Gaelco			
Salter Fitness: Pro Stepper Tele Cardioline	—	1997	Gaelco			
Samba de Amigo	—	1999	Sega	Rhythm		NAOMI cart.
Samba de Amigo Ver. 2000	—	2000	Sega	201779/space-seeker/		NAOMI cart.
Samurai	—	1980	Sega			
Samurai Aces	Sengoku Ace ^{JP}	1993	Psikyo	Scrolling shooter	2	
Samurai Nihon-ichi	—	1985	Taito			
Samurai Spirits	Samurai Showdown	1993	SNK	Fighting	2	
Samurai Spirits 64	Samurai Showdown 64	1997	SNK	Fighting	2	Hyper NeoGeo 64
Samurai Spirits 2: Asura Zanmaden	Samurai Spirits 64: Warrior's Rage	1998	SNK	Fighting	2	Hyper NeoGeo 64
Samurai Spirits Sen	—	2008	SNK	Fighting	2	
Samurai Spirits: Amakusa Kourin	Samurai Shodown IV - Amakusa's Revenge	1996	SNK	Fighting	2	
Samurai Spirits: Tenkaichi Kenkakuden	—	2005	SNK	Fighting	2	
Samurai Spirits: Zankurou Musouken	Samurai Shodown III	1995	SNK	Fighting	2	
Samurai Spirits Zero	Samurai Shodown V	2003	SNK	Fighting	2	
Samurai Spirits Zero Special	Samurai Shodown V Special	2004	SNK	Fighting	2	
San Francisco Rush 2049	—	1999	Atari Games	Racing	2	
San Francisco Rush 2049 Special Edition	—	2003	Betson	Racing	2	
San Francisco Rush 2049 Tournament Edition	—	2000	Atari Games	Racing	2	
San Francisco Rush: Extreme Racing	—	1996	Atari Games	Racing	2	
San Francisco Rush: The Rock	—	1997	Atari	Racing	2	
Sand Scorpion Sasori	—	1992	Face	Scrolling shooter	2	
SAR: Search and Rescue	—	1989	SNK	Scrolling shooter	2	
Sarge	—	1985	Bally Midway		2	
SaruKani Hamu Zou: Taisen Block Kuzushi	VS Block Breaker	1997	Kaneko		2	
Sasuke vs. Commander	—	1980	SNK			
Satan's Hollow	—	1982	Bally Midway	Shooter	2	
Saturday Night Slam Masters	Muscle Bomber - The Body Explosion^{JP}	1993	Capcom	Sports/Professional wrestling	4	CPS1
Saturn		1979	Data East	Shooter		
Saturn - Space Fighter 3D	—	1979	Data East	Fixed shooter		
Sauro	—					
Savage Bees	Super Floating Fortress Exed Exes ^{JP}	1985	Capcom	Vertical shooter	2	
Savage Quest	—	1999	Interactive Light			
Savage Reign	Fu'un Mokushiroku^{JP}	1995	SNK	Fighting		
Scandal Mahjong	—	1989	Nichibutsu			
Schmeiser Robo	—	1993	Hot-B			
Scion	—	1984	Seibu Denshi			
Scooter Shooter	—	1985	Konami	Shooter	2	
Scorpion	—	1982	Zaccaria			
Scotto	—	2014	Konami			
Scrabble	—	1997	JPM			
Scramble	—	1981	Konami	Horizontal shooter	2	
Scramble Formation	—	1986	Taito			
Scramble Spirits	—	1988	Sega	Scrolling shooter	2	
Scrambled Egg	—	1983	Technos			
Scrum Try	—	1984	Data East			DECO
Scud Race	Sega Super GT^{US}	1996	Sega	Racing	2	
Scud Race Plus	—	1997	Sega	Racing	2	
SD Fighters	—	1995	Semicom			
SD Gundam: Sangokushi Rainbow Tairiku Senki	—	1993	Banpresto			
SD Gundam Neo Battling	—	1992	Banpresto			
SDI	—	1987	Sega		2	
Sea Bass Fishing	—	1997	Able			
Sea Battle	—	1980	Zaccaria			
Sea Fighter Poseidon	—	1984	Taito	Action	2	
Sea Hunter Penguin	—	1995	WSAC Systems			
Sea Wolf	—	1976	Midway	Scrolling shooter	1	
Sea Wolf II	—	1978	Midway	Scrolling shooter	1	
Search Eye	—	1999	Yun Sung			
Search Eye Plus V2.0	—	1999	Yun Sung			
Second Chance	—	1985	SMS			
Section Z	—	1985	Capcom			
See See Find Out	—	1999	Icarus			
Sega Bass Fishing Challenge	—	2009	Sega			
Sega Clay Challenge	—	2009	Sega			
Sega Golf Club: Network Pro Tour	—	2005	Sega			
Sega Golf Club Version 2006: Next Tours	—	2006	Sega			
Sega Marine Fishing	—	2000	Sega			
Sega Ninja	Ninja Princess^{JP}	1985	Sega		2	
Sega Race TV	—	2008	Sega			
Sega Rally 2	—	1998	Sega	Racing	4	
Sega Rally 3	—	2008	Sega	Racing	4	Sega Europa-R
Sega Rally Championship	—	1995	Sega	Racing	2	
Sega Ski Super G	—	1996	Sega			
Sega Strike Fighter	—	2000	Sega			NAOMI cart.
Sega Tetris	—	1999	Sega			NAOMI cart.
Sega Touring Car Championship	—	1996	Sega	Racing		
Sega Water Ski	—	1997	Sega			
Sega Yonin Uchi Mahjong MJ	—	2002	Sega			NAOMI GD-ROM
SegaSonic the Hedgehog	—	1993	Sega	Platform game	3	
Seibu-Cup Soccer	—	1992	Seibu Kaihatsu		2	
Seicross	Sector Zone^{JP}	1984	Nichibutsu		2	
Seiha	—	1987	Nichibutsu			
Seimei-Kantei-Meimei-Ki Cult Name	—	1996	I'Max			
Seishun Mahjong Bijokko Gakuen	—	1988	Nichibutsu			
Seishun Quiz Colorful High School	—	2002	Namco			
Sel Feena	—	1991	East Technology			
Sen-Know	—	1999	Kaneko		2	
Sengeki Striker	—	1997	Warashi	Scrolling shooter	2	
Sengoku	—	1991	SNK	Beat 'em up	2	
Sengoku 2	—	1993	SNK	Beat 'em up	2	
Sengoku 3	—	2001	SNK	Beat 'em up	2	
Sengoku Basara X	—	2008	Capcom			
Senjyo	—	1983	Tecmo		2	
Senko no Ronde	—	2005	G.Rev			NAOMI GD-ROM
Senko no Ronde SP	—	2006	G.Rev			NAOMI GD-ROM
Sente Mini-Golf	—	1985	Bally Sente	Golf	2	
Sex Appeal	—	1992	GEI			
Sex Triv	—	1985	Status Games			
Sexual Trivia	—	1985	Kinky Kit and Game			
Sexy Gal	—	1985	Nichibutsu			
Sexy Parodius	—	1996	Konami	Horizontal shooter	2	
Shackled	Breywood^{JP}	1986	Data East	Shooter		
Shadow Dancer	—	1989	Sega	Run and gun		
Shadow Fighters	—	1993	Dutech			
Shadow Force: Henshin Ninja	—	1993	Technōs Japan			
Shadow Land	Youkai Douchuu-ki	1987	Namco			
Shadow Warriors	Ninja Ryukenden	1988	Tecmo			
Shakatto Tambourine	—	2000	Sega			NAOMI GD-ROM
Shakatto Tambourine 2001 Spring	—	2001	Sega			NAOMI GD-ROM
Shakatto Tambourine Chou Power Up Chu!	—	2001	Sega			NAOMI GD-ROM
Shamisen Brothers	—	2003	Kato Works			
Shanghai	—	1988	Sunsoft			
Shanghai II	—	1989	Sunsoft			
Shanghai III	—	1993	Sunsoft		2	
Shanghai Kid	Hokuha Syourin Hiryu no Ken^{JP}	1985	Taito	Beat 'em up		
Shanghai Matekibuyuu	—	1998	Sunsoft			
Shanghai Sangokuhai Tougi	—	2002	Warashi			Taito G-Net
Shanghai Shoryu Sairin	—	2000	Activision			Taito G-Net
Shanghai: Banri no Choujou	—	1995	Sunsoft			Sega ST-V
Shao-lin's Road	Kicker^{EN}	1985	Konami	Beat 'em up	2	
Shark	—	1975	U.S. Billiards			
Shark Attack	—	1981	Pacific Novelty			
Shark Jaws	—	1975	Atari	Action	1	
Shark Party	—	1995	Alpha			
Sharpshooter	—	1998	P&P Marketing			
Sheng Dan Wu Xian	—	2002	International Games System			
Sheriff	Bandido	1979	Nintendo	Multidirectional shooter	1	
Shienryu	—	1996	Sega			Sega ST-V
Shikigami no Shiro	Castle of Gods	2001	Taito	Scrolling shooter		
Shikigami no Shiro II	—	2003	Taito	Scrolling shooter		
Shikigami no Shiro III	—	2006	Taito	Scrolling shooter		
Shimizushi Dai Joryuu Yonkan'ou Kanshuu: Joryuu Shougi Kyoushitsu	—	1997	Visco			
Shin Gouketsuji Ichizoku Toukon: Matrimelee	—	2002	Playmore	Fighting	2	
Shin Nihon Pro Wrestling Toukon Retsuden 3: Arcade Edition	—	1997	Sega			
Shin Nihon Pro Wrestling Toukon Retsuden 4: Arcade Edition	—	1999	Sega			NAOMI cart.
Shin Samurai Spirits: Haohmaru Jigoku-Hen	Samurai Showdown II	1994	SNK	Fighting	2	
Shin-Oh-Ken	—	1996	Saurus	Fighting	2	
Shingen Samurai-Fighter	Takeda Shingen	1988	Jaleco	Hack and slash		
Shinobi	—	1987	Sega	Run and gun	2	
Shisen-shou: Joshiryou-hen	Match It^{US} Sichuan II	1989	Tamtex			
Shisen-shou II	Match It II^{US}	1993	Tamtex			
Shizhan Ding Huang Maque	—	1998	GMS			
Shock Troopers	—	1997	SNK	Run and gun	2	
Shock Troopers: 2nd Squad	—	1998	SNK	Run and gun	2	
Shocking	—	1997	Yun Sung			
Shogun Warriors	Fujiyama Buster	1992	Kaneko		2	
Shoot Out	—	1985	Data East			
Shoot The Bull	—	1985	Bally Midway		4	
Shooting Gallery	—	1984	Zaccaria			
Shooting Love 2007: Exzeal & Shmups Skill Test	—	2007	Triangle Service			NAOMI cart.
Shooting Master	—	1985	Sega			
Shooting Star	—	1994	Nova			
Shootout Pool	—	2002	Sega			NAOMI GD-ROM
Shot Rider	—	1984	Sigma			
Shougi	—	1980	Alpha Denshi			
Shougi no Tatsujin: Master of Shougi	—	1995	SNK		2	NeoGeo
Shougi Part II	—	1982	Alpha Denshi			
Showdown	—	1988	Exidy			
Shuffleboard	—	1978	Midway			
Shuffleshot	—	1997	Incredible Technologies			
Shusse Ōzumō	—	1984	SNK	Sports	1	
Shuttle Invader	—	1979	OEC			
Shuuz	—	1990	Atari Games	Sports	2	
Side By Side	—	1996	Taito			
Side By Side 2	—	1997	Taito			
Side Pocket	—	1985	Data East			
Side Track	—	1979	Exidy			
Sidewinder	—	1988	Arcadia Systems	Action	2	Arcadia
Silent Dragon	—	1992	Taito			
Silent Scope	—	1999	Konami	Shooter	1	
Silent Scope: Fortune Hunter	—	2002	Konami	Shooter	1	
Silent Scope EX	Sogeki^{JP}	2001	Konami	Shooter	1	
Silk Worm	—	1988	Tecmo	Shooter	2	
Silver Ball	—	200?	TAB-Austria			
Silver Ball Bulova	—	200?	TAB-Austria			
Silver Millennium	—	1995	Para			
The Simpsons	—	1991	Konami	Beat 'em up	4	
The Simpsons Bowling	—	2000	Konami			
Sindbad Mystery	—	1983	Sega			
Sinistar	—	1982	Williams	Scrolling shooter	2	
Skat TV	—	1994	ADP			
Skater	—	1983	Data East			DECO
Skeet Shot	—	1991	Dynamo			
Skelagon	SF-X	1983	Nichibutsu	Shooter	2	
Ski Champ	—	1998	Sega			
Skill Draw Poker	—	1979	ESI			
Skill Trek	—	1990	Barcrest			
Skill Trivia	—	1986	Greyhound Electronics			
Skimaxx	—	1996	ICE			
Skins Game	—	2000	Midway			
Skins Game: Tournament Edition	—	2000	Midway			
Skull & Crossbones	—	1989	Atari Games	Hack and slash	2	
Skull Fang: Kuuga Gaiden	—	1996	Data East			
Sky Adventure	—	1989	Alpha Denshi	Scrolling shooter	2	
Sky Alert	—	1992	Metro			
Sky Army	—	1982	Shoei			
Sky Base	—	1982	Omori Electric			
Sky Bumper	—	1982	Venture Line			
Sky Chuter	—	1980	Irem			
Sky Destroyer	—	1985	Taito			
Sky Kid	—	1985	Namco	Scrolling shooter	2	
Sky Kid Deluxe	—	1986	Namco	Scrolling shooter	2	Namco System 86
Sky Lancer	—	1983	Orca			
Sky Love	—	1979	Omori Electric			
Sky Raider	—	1978	Atari	Shooter	1	
Sky Shark	Hi Sho Zame	1987	Romstar			
Sky Skipper	—	1981	Nintendo			
Sky Smasher	—	1990	Nihon System			
Sky Soldiers	—	1988	SNK	Scrolling shooter	2	
Sky Target	—	1995	Sega			
Skydiver	—	1978	Atari	Action	2	
Slap Fight	Alcon	1986	Taito	Scrolling shooter	2	
Slap Shooter	—	1986	Sega			
Slap Shot	—	1994	Taito			
Slash Out	—	2000	Sega			NAOMI cart.
Slick Shot	—	1990	Grand Products			
Slipstream	—	1995	Capcom	Racing	1	
Slither	—	1982	Century II			
Sliver	—	1996	Hollow			
Slot Carnival	—	1985	Wing			
Sly Spy	Secret Agent	1989	Data East			
Smash Court Tennis	—	2002	Namco			
Smash TV	—	1990	Williams	Multidirectional shooter	2	
Smashing Drive	—	2001				
Snacks'n Jaxson	—	1984	Bally Sente			
Snake Pit	—	1984	Bally Sente			
Snakes & Ladders: Trivia Quiz	—	1997	JPM			
Snap Jack	—	1981	Universal			
Snapper	—	1990	Philiko			
Snezhnaya Koroleva	—	1988	Terminal			
SNK vs. Capcom: SVC Chaos	—	2003	SNK Playmore	Fighting game	2	
Snow Board Championship	—	1996	Gaelco			
Snow Bros.	—	1990	Toaplan		2	
Snow Bros. 2: With New Elves	Otenki Paradise^{JP}	1994	Toaplan		2	
Soccer	—	1973	Ramtek			
Soccer Brawl	—	1992	SNK	Sports	2	NeoGeo
Soccer Superstars	—	1994	Konami			
Sokonuke Taisen Game	—	1995	Sammy			
Sol Divide: Sword of Darkness	—	1997	Psikyo			
Solar Assault: Gradius	—	1997	Konami	Shooter	1	
Solar Assault: Revised	—	1997	Konami	Shooter	1	
Solar Fox	—	1981	Bally Midway			
Solar Quest	—	1980	Cinematronics	Multidirectional shooter	2	
Solar War	—	1979	Atari			
Soldam	—	1992	Jaleco			
Soldier Girl Amazon	Sei Senshi Amatelass	1986	Nichibutsu	Scrolling shooter	2	
Solitary Fighter	—	1991	Taito	Fighting	2	
Solite Spirits	—	1999	Promat			
Solomon no Kagi	—	1986	Tecmo	Puzzle	2	
Solvalou	—	1991	Namco	3D Shooter	1	
Son Son	—	1984	Capcom			
Sonic Boom	—	1987	Sega	Scrolling shooter	2	
Sonic the Fighters	Sonic Championship	1996	Sega	Fighting	2	
Sorcer Striker	Mahou Daisakusen	1993	Sorcer Striker		2	
Soreike Kokology	—	1992	Sega			
Soreike Kokology Vol. 2: Kokoro no Tanteikyoku	—	1993	Sega			
SOS	—	1979	Namco	Fixed shooter	2	
Sotsugyou Shousho	—	1995	Mitchell			
Soulcalibur	—	1998	Namco	Versus fighting	2	
Soulcalibur II	—	2002	Namco	Versus fighting	2	
Soulcalibur III: Arcade Edition	—	2006	Namco	Versus fighting	2	
Soul Edge	Soul Blade^{EU/US}	1996	Namco		2	
Soul Edge Ver. II	—	1995	Namco		2	
Soul Surfer	—	2002	Sega			
Soutenryu	—	2000	Warashi			Taito G-Net
Space Ace	—	1983	Cinematronics		1	
Space Attack	—	1983	Sega			
Space Battle	—	1980	Hoei	Shooter		
Space Beam	—	1979	Irem			
Space Bomber	—	1998	Psikyo			
Space Bugger	—	1981	Game-A-Tron			
Space Chaser	—	1979	Taito		2	
Space Cruiser	—	1981	Taito		2	
Space Cyclone	—	1980	Taito	Fixed shooter	2	
Space Duel	—	1980	Atari	Multidirectional shooter	2	
Space Dungeon	—	1982	Taito	Multidirectional shooter	2	
Space Encounters	—	1980	Bally Midway	Shooter	1	
Space Fever	—	1979	Nintendo	Fixed shooter	2	
Space Fever High Splitter	—	1979	Nintendo	Fixed shooter	2	
Space Fighter Mark II	—	1979	Data East	Fixed shooter		
Space Firebird	—	1980	Nintendo	Fixed shooter	2	
Space Force	Meteoroids	1980	Venture Line			
Space Fortress	—	1981	Century Electronics			
Space Fury	—	1981	Sega	Multidirectional shooter	2	
Space Guerrilla	—	1979	Omori Electric			
Space Gun	—	1990	Taito	Shooting gallery	2	
Space Harrier	—	1985	Sega	Rail shooter	1	
Space Intruder	—	1980	Shoei			
Space Invaders	Galactica: Batalha Espacial^{BR} T.T. Space Invader	1978	Taito	Fixed shooter	2	
Space Invaders '95	Akkanvader ^{JP} Space Invaders '95: Attack of the Lunar Loonies	1995	Taito	Fixed shooter	2	
Space Invaders Anniversary	—	2003	Taito			Taito G-Net
Space Invaders DX	—	1994	Taito	Fixed shooter	2	
Space Invaders II	—	1980	Midway	Fixed shooter	2	
Space Invaders Part II	T.T Space Invaders Part II	1979	Taito	Fixed shooter	2	
Space Invasion	—	1980	Tangerine Computer Systems			
Space King	—	1978	Leijac			
Space King-2	—	1979	Leijac			
Space Launcher	—	1979	Nintendo			
Space Lords	—	1992	Atari Games	Simulation game	8	
Space Odyssey	—	1981	Sega	Scrolling shooter	2	
Space Panic	—	1980	Universal	Platform game	2	
Space Pirates	—	1992	American Laser Games			
Space Position	—	1986	Sega			
Space Race	Astro Race^{JP} Asteroid	1973	Atari	Racing	2	
Space Raider	—	1982	Universal			
Space Ranger	—	1987	Arcadia Systems	Action	2	Arcadia
Space Seeker	—	1981	Taito	Shooter	2	
Space Stranger	—	1979	Yachiyo Electronics			
Space Stranger 2	—	1979	Yachiyo Electronics			
Space Tactics	—	1980	Sega			
Space Train	—	1981	Armenia			
Space Trek	—	1980	Sega			
Space Walk	—	1978	Midway			
Space War (Leijac)	Space Laser	1979	Leijac			
Space War (Sanritsu)	—	1979	Sanritsu			
Space Warp	—	1979	Century Electronics			
Space Wars	Space Ship	1977	Cinematronics, Sega	Multidirectional shooter	2	
Space Zap	—	1980	Bally Midway	Multidirectional shooter		
Spark Man	—	1989	SunA Electronics			
Spatter	Sanrin San-Chan - Tricycle-San	1984	Sega			
Spawn: In the Demon's Hand	—	1999	Sega, Capcom	Arena Fighting	1	
Speak & Rescue	Stratovox	1980	Sun Electronics			
Special Forces II	—	1985	Magic Electronics		4	
Special Forces: Elite Training	—	2002	ICE			
Special Forces: Kung Fu Commando	—	1985	Magic Electronics		4	
Spectar	Phantomas	1980	Exidy		2	
Spectral Vs Generation	—	2005	IGS		2	
Spectrum 2000	—	2000	YONA Tech			
Speed Attack!	—	1984	Seta Kikaku			
Speed Ball	—	1987	Tecfri			
Speed Driver	—	1999	IGS	Racing		
Speed Freak	—	1979	Vectorbeam	Racing		
Speed Race (Olympia)	—	1980	Olympia	Racing		
Speed Race (Taito)	T.T. Speed Race	1974	Taito	Racing		
Speed Racer	—	1995	Namco	Racing	2	
Speed Spin	—	1994	TCH			
Speed Up	—	1996	Gaelco	Racing		
Spelunker	—	1985	Irem	Platformer	2	
Spelunker II: 23 no Kagi	Spelunker II	1990	Irem	Platformer	2	
Spica Adventure	—	2005	Taito			
Spider	—	1994	Buena Vision			
Spider-Man: The Video Game	—	1991	Sega	Beat 'em up	4	
Spiders	—	1981	Sigma Enterprises	Fixed shooter	2	
Spikers Battle	—	2001	Sega			NAOMI GD-ROM
Spikeout: Digital Battle Online	—	1998	Sega			
Spikeout: Final Edition	—	1999	Sega			
Spiker	—	1986	Bally Sente			
Spinal Breakers	—	1991	V-System			
Spinmaster	Miracle Adventure	1993	Data East		2	NeoGeo
Spinner-87 Legion	Choutoki Meikyuu Legion^{JP}	1987	Nichibutsu	Scrolling shooter	2	
Splash!	Painted Lady	1992	Gaelco			
Splat!	—	1982	Williams			
Splatterhouse	—	1988	Namco	Beat 'em up	2	
Splendor Blast	—	1985	Alpha Denshi			
Splendor Blast II	—	1985	Alpha Denshi			
Sport Fishing 2	—	1995	Sega			
Sports Authority Challenge	—	1992	GEI			
Sports Jam	—	2001	Sega			NAOMI GD-ROM
Sports Shooting USA	—	2003	Sammy			
SportTime Table Hockey	—	1988	Designstar Consultants	Sports	2	Arcadia
SportTime Ten Pin Bowling	—	1988	Designstar Consultants	Sports	2	Arcadia
Spot	—	1990	Arcadia Systems	Action	2	Arcadia
Spotty	—	2001	Prince			
Springer	—	1982	Orca	Platformer	2	
Sprint 1	—	1978	Atari	Racing	1	
Sprint 2	—	1976	Atari	Racing	2	
Sprint 4	—	1977	Atari	Racing	4	
Sprint 8	—	1977	Atari	Racing	8	
Spy Hunter	—	1983	Bally Midway	Driving	1	
Spy Hunter II	—	1987	Bally Midway	Driving	2	
Squash (Gaelco)	—	1992	Gaelco			
Squash (Itisa Electronics)	—	1984	Itisa Electronics			
SRD: Super Real Darwin	—	1987	Data East			
Stack Columns	—	1994	Sega			
Stadium Cross	—	1992	Sega			
Stadium Hero	—	1988	Data East	Sports	2	
Stakes Winner 2	—	1996	Saurus	Sports	2	NeoGeo
Stakes Winner: GI Kinzen Seihae no Michi	—	1995	Saurus	Sports	2	NeoGeo
Star Audition	—	1997	Namco			
Star Blazer	Galaxy Ranger	1993	Sega			
Star Castle	—	1980	Cinematronics	Multidirectional shooter	2	
Star Cruiser	—	1977	Ramtek			
Star Destroyer Bosconian	—	1981	Namco	Scrolling shooter	2	
Star Fighter (SunA Electronics)	—	1990	SunA Electronics			
Star Fire	—	1979	Exidy		1	
Star Force	Megaforce	1984	Tecmo	Scrolling shooter	2	
Star Gladiator: Episode I - Final Crusade	—	1996	Capcom	Fighting	2	ZN-1
Star Gladiator 2: Nightmare of Bilstein	Plasma Sword: Nightmare of Bilstein	1998	Capcom	Fighting	2	ZN-2
Star Guards	—	1987	Bally Midway			
Star Hawk	—	1979	Cinematronics	shooter		
Star Jacker	—	1983	Sega			
Star Raker	—	1981	Sega			
Star Rider	—	1984	Williams			
Star Soldier: Vanishing Earth	—	1998	Hudson Soft / SETA	Shooter	1	
Star Trek	Star Trek: Strategic Operations Simulator	1982	Sega	Multidirectional shooter	2	
Star Trek: Voyager – The Arcade Game	—	2001 / 2002	Monarch Entertainment	Rail shooter	2	
Star Trigon	—	2002	Namco	Puzzle	1	
Star Wars (1983 arcade game)	—	1983	Atari	Rail shooter	1	
Star Wars Arcade (1993 arcade game)	—	1993	Sega	Simulation game		Sega Model 1
Star Wars Racer Arcade	—	2000	Sega			
Star Wars Trilogy Arcade	—	1998	Sega			
Starblade	—	1991	Namco	Simulation game	1	
Stargate	—	1981	Williams	Scrolling shooter	2	
Starship 1	—	1977	Atari	Shooter	1	
StarSweep	—	1997	Axela		4	
Steal See	—	2000	Eolith			
Steel Force	—	1994	Electronic Devices	Run and gun	1	
Steel Gunner	—	1990	Namco	Shooter	2	
Steel Gunner 2	—	1991	Namco	Shooter	2	
Steel Talons	—	1991	Atari Games	Simulation game	2	
Steel Worker	—	1980	Taito			
Steep Slope Sliders	—	1997	Cave / Capcom			Sega ST-V
Steeplechase	—	1975	Atari	Sports	6	
Steering Champ	—	1997	Konami			
Stelle e Cubi	—	1998	Sure			
Step Champ	—	1999	Konami			
Stepping 3 Superior	—	1999	Jaleco			
Stepping Stage	—	1999	Jaleco			
Stepping Stage Special	—	1999	Jaleco			
Stinger	—	1983	Seibu Denshi			
Stocker: Drive all the way from coast to coast!	—	1984	Bally Sente			
Stompin	—	1986	Bally Sente			
Stone Ball	—	1994	Art & Magic	Sports	4	
Storm Blade	—	1996	Visco	Scrolling shooter	2	
Straight Flush	—	1979	Taito			
Strata Bowling	—	1990	Strata Group			
Strategy X	—	1981	Konami			
Streaking	—	1981	Shoei	Maze	2	
Street Burners	—	1975	Allied Leisure			
Street Fighter	—	1987	Capcom	Fighting	2	
Street Fighter II	Street Fighter II - The World Warrior	1991	Capcom	Fighting	2	CPS1
Street Fighter II: Champion Edition	—	1992	Capcom	Fighting	2	CPS1
Street Fighter II': Champion Edition	—	1992	Capcom	Fighting	2	CPS1
Street Fighter II: Hyper Fighting	—	1992	Capcom	Fighting	2	
Street Fighter II': Hyper Fighting	Street Fighter II' Turbo: Hyper Fighting	1992	Capcom	Fighting	2	
Street Fighter III	Street Fighter III - New Generation	1997	Capcom	Fighting	2	CPS3
Street Fighter III: 2nd Impact	Street Fighter III - 2nd Impact : Giant Attack	1997	Capcom	Fighting	2	CPS3
Street Fighter III: 3rd Strike	Street Fighter III - 3rd Strike : Fight For The Future	1999	Capcom	Fighting	2	CPS3
Street Fighter IV	—	2008	Capcom	Fighting	2	
Street Fighter Alpha: Warriors' Dreams	Street Fighter Zero ^{JP}	1995	Capcom	Fighting	2	
Street Fighter Alpha 2	Street Fighter Zero 2 ^{JP}	1996	Capcom	Fighting	2	
Street Fighter Alpha 3	Street Fighter Zero 3 ^{JP}	1998	Capcom	Fighting	2	
Street Fighter EX	—	1996	Arika	Fighting	2	ZN-1
Street Fighter EX Plus	—	1997	Arika	Fighting	2	ZN-1
Street Fighter EX2	—	1998	Arika	Fighting	2	ZN-2
Street Fighter EX2 Plus	—	1999	Arika	Fighting	2	ZN-2
Street Fighter Zero 2 Alpha	—	1996	Capcom	Fighting	2	
Street Fighter Zero 3 Upper	—	2001	Capcom	Fighting	2	NAOMI GD-ROM
Street Fighter: The Movie	—	1995	Incredible Technologies / Capcom	Fighting	2	
Street Football	—	1986	Bally Sente			
Street Games	—	1993	New Image Technologies			
Street Games II	—	1993	New Image Technologies			
Street Heat	—	1985	Epos	Racing	2	
Street Smart	—	1989	SNK	Beat 'em up	2	
Strength & Skill	The Guiness ^{JP}	1984	Sun Electronics		2	
Stress Busters	—	1998	Sega			Sega ST-V
Strider	Strider Hiryu ^{JP}	1989	Capcom	Platformer	2	CPS1
Strider 2	Strider Hiryu 2 ^{JP}	1999	Capcom	Platformer	2	ZN-2
Strike Bowling	—	1982	Taito			
Strike Fighter	—	1991	Sega		1	
Strike Zone Baseball	—	1988	Leland		2	
Strikeforce	—	1991	Midway	Scrolling shooter	2	
Strike Gunner S.T.G	—	1991	Tecmo	Scrolling shooter	2	
Strikers 1945	—	1995	Psikyo	Scrolling shooter	2	
Strikers 1945 II	—	1997	Psikyo	Scrolling shooter	2	
Strikers 1945 III	Strikers 1999 ^{JP}	1999	Psikyo	Scrolling shooter	2	
Strikers 1945 Plus	—	1999	Psikyo	Scrolling shooter		
Stunt Cycle	—	1976	Atari	Driving	2	
Stunt Typhoon Plus	—	2001	Taito			
Submarine	—	1985	Sigma Enterprises			
SubRoc-3D	—	1982	Sega		1	
Subs	—	1979	Atari	Shooter	2	
Success Joe	Ashita no Joe	1990	Taito			
Suiko Enbu	—	1995	Sega			Sega ST-V
Sukeban Janshi Ryuuko	—	1987	Sega			
SunA Quiz 6000 Academy	—	1994	SunA Electronics			
Sundance	—	1979	Cinematronics	Puzzle	2	
Sunset Riders	—	1991	Konami	Run and gun	4	
Super Astro Fighter	—	1981	Data East			DECO
Super Bagman	—	1984	Valadon Automation	Platformer	2	
Super Bar	—	1994	Promat			
Super Baseball Double Play Home Run Derby	—	1987	Leland			
Super Basketball	—	1984	Konami	Sports	2	
Super Bishi Bashi Champ	—	1998	Konami			
Super Breakout	—	1978	Atari	Breakout	2	
Super Bubble 2003	—	2003	Limenko			
Super Bug	—	1977	Atari	Driving	1	
Super Burger Time	—	1990	Data East			
Super Card	—	1992	Fun World			
Super CD Dai8dan Mahjong Hanafuda Cosplay Tengoku	—	1995	Sphinx			
Super Champion Baseball	—	1989	Alpha Denshi	Sports	2	
Super Chase: Criminal Termination	—	1992	Taito	Racing	1	
Super Cobra	—	1981	Konami	Horizontal shooter	2	
Super Contra	—	1988	Konami	Run and gun	2	
Super Cross II	—	1986	GM Shoji			
Super Crowns Golf	—	1989	Nasco			
Super Cup Finals	—	1993	Taito			
Super Dead Heat	—	1985	Taito			
Super Dodge Ball	Nekketsu Kōkō Dodgeball Bu ^{JP}	1987	Technōs Japan	Sports	2	
Super Don Quix-ote	—	1984				
Super Doubles Tennis	—	1983	Data East			
Super Dragon Ball Z	—	2005	Banpresto			
Super Duck	—	1992	Comad			
Super Duper Casino!	—	1987	US Games			
Super Eagle Shot	—	1994	Seta			
Super Football Champ	—	1996	Taito			
Super Formula: Chijou Saisoku no Battle	Tail to Nose: Great Championship	1989	V-System			
Super Free Kick	—	1988	HJ Corp			
Super Gem Fighter Mini Mix	Pocket Fighter ^{JP}	1997	Capcom	Fighting	2	
Super GT 24h	—	1996	Jaleco			
Super GX	—	1980	Nichibutsu			
Super Hana Paradise	—	1994	Dynax			
Super Haeyo Deluxe	—	1996	SemiCom			
Super Hang-On	—	1987	Sega	Racing	1	
Super High Impact	—	1991	Midway			
Super League	—	1987	Sega			
Super Locomotive	—	1982	Sega			
Super Lup Lup Puzzle	—	1999	Omega System			
Super Major League	Final Arch^{JP}	1995	Sega			Sega ST-V
Super Major League '99	—	1999	Sega			NAOMI cart.
Super Megatouch IV	—	1996	Merit			
Super Megatouch IV Tournament Edition	—	1996	Merit			
Super Megatouch IV Turnier Version	—	1996	Merit			
Super Miss World	—	1996	Comad			
Super Missile Attack	—	1981	GCC	Shoot 'em up	2	
Super Model	—	1994	Comad			
Super Model II	—	1994	Comad			
Super Monaco GP	—	1989	Sega			
Super Moon Cresta	—	1981	Gremlin			
Super Mouse	Funny Mouse	1982	Taito			
Super Nudger II	—	1989	Coinmaster			
Super Othello	—	1986	Fujiwara			
Super Pac-Man	—	1982	Namco	Maze	2	
Super Pang	Super Buster Bros	1974	Atari	Sports	2	
Super Pinball Action	—	1991	Tecmo			
Super Pit Boss	—	198?	Merit			
Super Poker (GEI)	—	1987	GEI			
Super Poker (IGS)	—	199?	IGS			
Super Pong	—	1974	Atari			
Super Punch-Out!!	—	1984	Nintendo			
Super Puzzle	—	1991	Sang Ho			
Super Puzzle Bobble	—	1999	Taito			Taito G-Net
Super Puzzle Fighter II Turbo	Super Puzzle Fighter II X ^{JP}	1996	Capcom	Puzzle	2	
Super Qix	—	1987	Taito			
Super Real Mahjong P.V	—	1994	Seta	Mahjong		
Super Real Mahjong P7	—	1997	Seta	Mahjong		
Super Real Mahjong Part 3	—	1988	Seta	Mahjong		
Super Real Mahjong PI	—	1987	Seta	Mahjong		
Super Real Mahjong PII	—	1987	Seta	Mahjong		
Super Real Mahjong PIV	—	1993	Seta	Mahjong		
Super Real Mahjong PVI	—	1995	Seta	Mahjong		
Super Real Mahjong VS	—	1999	Seta	Mahjong		Aleck64
Super Rider	—	1983	Venture Line			
Super Road Champions	—	1978	Model Racing			
Super Shanghai 2005	—	2005	Starfish			NAOMI GD-ROM
Super Shanghai Dragon's Eye	—	1992	Hot-B			
Super Shot	—	1979	Model Racing			
Super Slam	—	1993	Playmark			
Super Slams: From TV Animation	—	1995	Banpresto			
Super Space Invaders '91	Majestic 12 - The Space Invaders Part IV	1991	Taito	Fixed shooter	2	
Super Spacefortress Macross	—	1992	Banpresto			
Super Spacefortress Macross II	—	1993	Banpresto			
Super Speed Race	—	1979	Taito / Midway			
Super Speed Race Jr.	—	1985	Taito			
Super Sprint	—	1986	Atari Games	Racing	3	
The Super Spy	—	1990	SNK		2	
Super Stingray	—	1986	Alpha Denshi	Shooter	2	
Super Street Fighter II	Super Street Fighter II - The New Challengers	1993	Capcom	Fighting	2	
Super Street Fighter II: The Tournament Battle	—	1993	Capcom	Fighting	2	
Super Street Fighter II Turbo	Super Street Fighter II X - Grand Master Challenge ^{JP}	1994	Capcom	Fighting	2	
Super Street Fighter IV Arcade Edition		2010	Capcom	Fighting	2	
Super Tank	—	1981	Video Games, GmbH			
Super Ten	—	1988	U.S. Games			
Super Toffy	—	1994	Unico Electronics			
Super Trio	—	1994	Gameace			
Super Triv	—	1985	Nova du Canada			
Super Triv II	—	1986	Status Games			
Super Triv III	—	1988	Status Games			
Super Trivia Master	—	1986	PGD			
Super Two In One	—	1993	Funtech			
Super Visual Soccer: Sega Cup	Super Visual Football - European Sega Cup^{EU} The J.League 1994^{JP}	1994	Sega		2	
Super Volleyball	Super Volley Ball^{JP}	1989	V-System	Sports	2	
Super Wing	—	1985	Wing			
Super World Court	—	1992	Namco	Sports	2	
Super World Stadium	—	1991	Namco	Sports	2	
Super World Stadium '92	—	1992	Namco	Sports	2	
Super World Stadium '92 Gekitouban	—	1992	Namco	Sports	2	
Super World Stadium '93	—	1993	Namco	Sports	2	
Super World Stadium '95	—	1995	Namco	Sports	2	
Super World Stadium '96	—	1996	Namco	Sports	2	
Super World Stadium '97	—	1997	Namco	Sports	2	
Super World Stadium '98	—	1998	Namco	Sports	2	
Super World Stadium 1999	—	1999	Namco	Sports	2	
Super World Stadium 2000	—	1999	Namco	Sports	2	
Super World Stadium 2001	—	1999	Namco	Sports	2	
Super Xevious	—	1984	Namco	Scrolling shooter	2	
Super Zaxxon	—	1982	Sega	Isometric shooter	2	
Super-X	—	1994	NTC	Scrolling shooter	2	
Superbike	—	1983	Century Electronics			
Superbowl	—	1982	Greyhound Electronics			
Superior Soldiers	Perfect Soldiers^{JP}	1993	Irem			
Superman	—	1988	Taito			
Surf Planet	—	1997	Gaelco			
Surprise Attack	—	1990	Konami		2	
Survival	—	1975	U.S. Billiards	Sports	4	
Survival	—	1982	Rock-ola			
Survival Arts	—	1993	American Sammy			
Susume! Mile Smile	—	1995	Fuuki			
Susume! Taisen Puzzle Dama	—	1996	Konami			
Suzuka 8 Hours	—	1992	Namco	Racing	8	
Suzuka 8 Hours 2	—	1993	Namco	Racing	8	
SVC Chaos: SNK Vs. Capcom	—	2003	Playmore		2	NeoGeo
SWAT	—	1984	Sega			
SWAT Police	—	2001	Excellent Soft Design			
Swimmer	—	1982	Tehkan			
Swinging Singles	Utamaro^{JP}	1983	Entertainment Enterprises, Ltd.	Adult	1	
Symbols	—	1985	Advanced Video Technology			
Syvalion	—	1988	Taito	Shoot 'em up		

== Prototypes ==
Title	Alternate Title(s)	Year	Manufacturer	Genre(s)	Max. Players	Notes
Screw Loose	—	1983	Mylstar			
Shrike Avenger	—	1986	Bally Sente			
Sparkz	—	1992	Atari Games			
Street Drivin'	—	1993	Atari Games			
