= 74181 =

First arithmetic logic unit (ALU) on a single chip

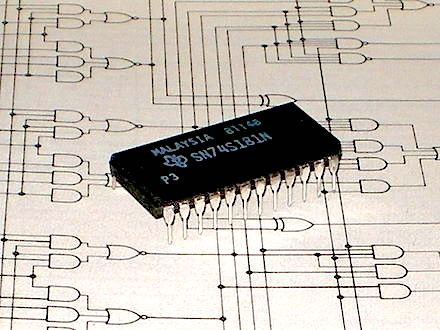
The 74S181 4-bit ALU bitslice resting on a page from the datasheet

The 74181 is a 4-bit slice arithmetic logic unit (ALU), implemented as a 7400 series TTL integrated circuit. Introduced by Texas Instruments in February 1970, it was the first complete ALU on a single chip. It was used as the arithmetic/logic core in the CPUs of many historically significant minicomputers and other devices.

The 74181 represents an evolutionary step between the CPUs of the 1960s, which were constructed using discrete logic gates, and single-chip microprocessors of the 1970s. Although no longer used in commercial products, the 74181 later was used in hands-on computer architecture courses and is still referenced in textbooks and technical papers.

== Specifications ==
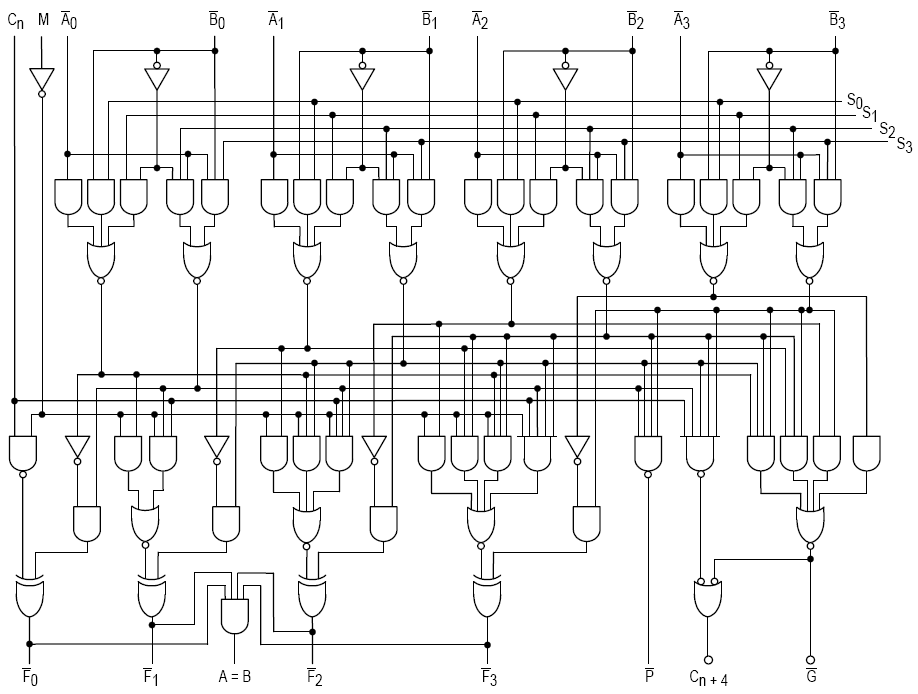
The combinational logic circuitry of the 74181 integrated circuit

The 74181 is a 7400 series medium-scale integration (MSI) TTL integrated circuit, containing the equivalent of 75 logic gates and most commonly packaged as a 24-pin DIP. The 4-bit wide ALU can perform all the traditional add / subtract / decrement operations with or without carry, as well as AND / NAND, OR / NOR, XOR, and shift. Many variations of these basic functions are available, for a total of 16 arithmetic and 16 logical operations on two four-bit words. Multiply and divide functions are not provided but can be performed in multiple steps using the shift and add or subtract functions.

Shift is not an explicit function but can be derived from several available functions; e.g., selecting function "A plus A" with carry (M=0) will give an arithmetic left shift of the A input. Right shifts are not supported.

The 74181 performs operations on two four-bit operands generating a four-bit result with carry in 22 nanoseconds (45 MHz). The 74S181 performs the same operations in 11 nanoseconds (90 MHz), while the 74F181 performs the operations in 7 nanoseconds (143 MHz) (typical).

Multiple slices can be combined for arbitrarily large word sizes. For example, sixteen 74S181s and five 74S182 look ahead carry generators can be combined to perform the same operations on 64-bit operands in 28 nanoseconds (36 MHz). Although overshadowed by the performance of today's multi-gigahertz 64-bit microprocessors, this was quite impressive when compared to the single-digit megahertz clock speeds of the early eight-bit microprocessors.

=== Implemented functions ===
The 74181 implements all 16 possible logical functions with two variables. Its arithmetic functions include addition and subtraction with and without carry. It can be used with active-high data, in which a high logic level corresponds to 1, and active-low data, in which a low logic level corresponds to 1.

==== Inputs and outputs ====
There are four selection inputs, S0 to S3, to select the function. M is used to select between logical and arithmetic operation, and Cn is the carry-in. A and B is the data to be processed (four bits). F is the number output. There are also P and a G signals for a carry-lookahead adder, which can be implemented via one or several 74182 chips.

==== Function table for output F ====
In the following table, AND is denoted as a product, OR with a $+$ sign, XOR with $\oplus$, logical NOT with an overbar and arithmetic plus and minus using the words plus and minus.

| Selection | | | | Active-low data | | | Active-high data | | |
| | | | | Logic M = H | Arithmetic M = L | | Logic M = H | Arithmetic M = L | |
| S3 | S2 | S1 | S0 | | Cn = L (no carry) | Cn = H (carry) | | $\overline{C}_n = H$ (no carry) | $\overline{C}_n = L$ (carry) |
| L | L | L | L | $\overline{A}$ | $A$ minus $1$ | ${A}$ | $\overline{A}$ | $A$ | $A$ plus 1 |
| L | L | L | H | $\overline{AB}$ | $AB$ minus $1$ | ${AB}$ | $\overline{A + B}$ | $A + B$ | ${(A + B)}$ plus $1$ |
| L | L | H | L | $\overline{A} + B$ | $A \overline{B}$ minus $1$ | $A \overline{B}$ | $\overline{A}B$ | $A + \overline{B}$ | $(A + \overline{B})$ plus 1 |
| L | L | H | H | Logical 1 | $-1$ (two's complement) | $0$ (zero) | Logical 0 | $-1$ (two's complement) | $0$ (zero) |
| L | H | L | L | $\overline{A+B}$ | $A$ plus $(A + \overline{B})$ | $A$ plus $(A + \overline{B})$ plus $1$ | $\overline{AB}$ | $A$ plus $A \overline{B}$ | $A$ plus $(A\overline{B})$ plus $1$ |
| L | H | L | H | $\overline{B}$ | $AB$ plus $(A + \overline{B})$ | $AB$ plus $(A + \overline{B})$ plus $1$ | $\overline{B}$ | $(A + B)$ plus $A \overline{B}$ | $(A + B)$ plus $A \overline{B}$ plus $1$ |
| L | H | H | L | $\overline{A \oplus B}$ | $A$ minus $B$ minus $1$ | $A$ minus $B$ | $A \oplus B$ | $A$ minus $B$ minus $1$ | $A$ minus $B$ |
| L | H | H | H | $A + \overline{B}$ | $A + \overline{B}$ | $A + \overline{B}$ plus $1$ | $A\overline{B}$ | $A \overline{B}$ minus 1 | $A\overline{B}$ |
| H | L | L | L | $\overline{A}B$ | $A$ plus $(A + B)$ | $A$ plus $(A + B)$ plus $1$ | $\overline{A} + B$ | $A$ plus $A B$ | $A$ plus $A B$ plus $1$ |
| H | L | L | H | $A \oplus B$ | $A$ plus $B$ | $A$ plus $B$ plus $1$ | $\overline{A \oplus B}$ | $A$ plus $B$ | $A$ plus $B$ plus $1$ |
| H | L | H | L | $B$ | $A \overline{B}$ plus $(A + B)$ | $A \overline{B}$ plus $(A + B)$ plus $1$ | $B$ | $(A + \overline{B})$ plus $A B$ | $(A + \overline{B})$ plus $A B$ plus $1$ |
| H | L | H | H | $A + B$ | $A + B$ | $(A + B)$ plus $1$ | $AB$ | $A B$ minus 1 | $AB$ |
| H | H | L | L | Logical 0 | $A$ plus $A$ | $A$ plus $A$ plus $1$ | Logical 1 | $A$ plus $A$ | $A$ plus $A$ plus $1$ |
| H | H | L | H | $A \overline{B}$ | $AB$ plus $A$ | $AB$ plus $A$ plus $1$ | $A + \overline{B}$ | $(A + B)$ plus $A$ | $(A+ B)$ plus $A$ plus $1$ |
| H | H | H | L | $A B$ | $A \overline{B}$ plus $A$ | $A \overline{B}$ plus $A$ plus $1$ | $A + B$ | $(A + \overline{B})$ plus $A$ | $(A + \overline{B})$ plus $A$ plus $1$ |
| H | H | H | H | $A$ | $A$ | $A$ plus $1$ | $A$ | $A$ minus $1$ | $A$ |

== Significance ==
The 74181 greatly simplified the development and manufacture of computers and other devices that required high speed computation during the 1970s through the early 1980s, and is still referenced as a "classic" ALU design.

Prior to the introduction of the 74181, computer CPUs occupied multiple circuit boards and even very simple computers could fill multiple cabinets. The 74181 allowed an entire CPU and in some cases, an entire computer to be constructed on a single large printed circuit board. The 74181 occupies a historically significant stage between older CPUs based on small-scale integration (SSI) logic spread over multiple circuit boards and modern microprocessors that incorporate all CPU functions in a single chip. The 74181 was used in various minicomputers and other devices beginning in the 1970s, but as microprocessors became more powerful the practice of building a CPU from discrete components fell out of favour and the 74181 was not used in any new designs.

== Education ==
By 1994, CPU designs based on the 74181 were not commercially viable due to the comparatively low price and high performance of microprocessors, but it was still useful for teaching computer organization and CPU design because it provided opportunities for hands-on design and experimentation.

- Digital Electronics with VHDL (Quartus II Version) review in Journal of Modern Engineering, Volume 7, Number 2, Spring 2007.
- A Minimal TTL Processor for Architecture Exploration a paper describing how the 74181 can be used to teach CPU architecture.
- A Hardware Lab for the Computer Organization Course at Small Colleges in 2003 used the 74LS181 in a lab class.
- 74181 + 74182 demonstration Java-based simulator
- APOLLO181 (by Gianluca.G, Italy 2012): a homemade educational processor made of TTL logics and bipolar memories, based upon the Bugbook I and II chips, in particular on the 74181.
- Build Your Computer using LOGIC & MEMORY, before the advent of microprocessor a video showing history and educational use of the 74181 ALU.
- A playable demo of the 74181 emulated in a physics simulator
- 74181+74182 PDIP and CERDIP packages are still manufactured and available for breadboarding.

== Computers ==
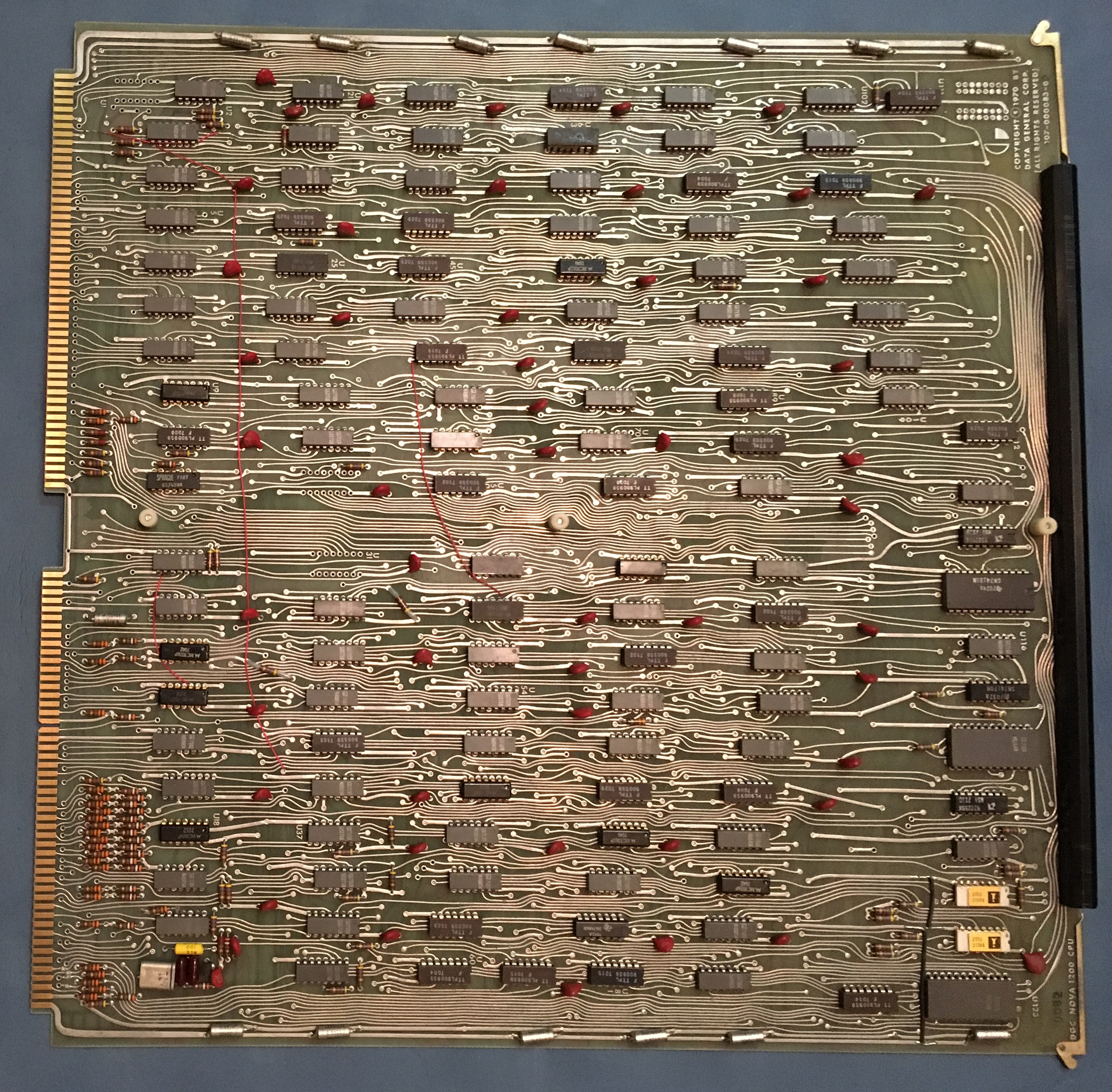
Nova 1200 CPU printed circuit board. The 74181 ALU is the large IC center-right. Click to enlarge.

Many computer CPUs and subsystems were based on the 74181, including several historically significant models.

- NOVA 1200 – Introduced in 1970 by Data General, it was the first commercial 16-bit minicomputer to use the 74181. Curiously, it uses only one 74181, running the data through four times. The later Nova 800 uses four 74181s.
- Several models of the PDP-11 – Most popular minicomputer of all time, manufactured by Digital Equipment Corporation.
- Xerox Alto – The first computer to use the desktop metaphor and graphical user interface (GUI).
- VAX-11/780 – The first VAX, the most popular 32-bit computer of the 1980s manufactured by Digital Equipment Corp.
- Three Rivers PERQ – A commercial computer workstation influenced by the Xerox Alto and first released in 1979.
- Computer Automation Naked Mini LSI-2 – LSI is misused as a marketing hook. It did not use a LSI processor but rather four 74181s.
- KMC11 – Peripheral processor for Digital Equipment Corporation PDP-11.
- FPP-12 – Floating-point unit for the Digital Equipment Corporation PDP-12.
- Wang 2200 CPU (one 74181 per CPU) and disk controller (two 74181s per controller)
- TI-980A/980B – Texas Instruments 16-bit minicomputers.
- TI-990 – Texas Instruments 16-bit minicomputers.
- Honeywell option 1100 – The so-called "scientific unit" option for Honeywell H200/H2000 series mainframes.
- Datapoint 2200 Version II used two 74181s as did follow-on machines, the Datapoint 5500, 6600, and 1800/3800 – The successors of the computer that defined the architecture for the Intel 8008.
- Cogar System 4 / Singer 1501 / ICL 1501 Intelligent Terminal
- Varian Data Machines – V70 series of 16-bit minicomputers
- HP 2100 series – About half the models in the series used four 74181s.
- The ABLE 16-bit minicomputer from New England Digital, used as the processor for their Synclavier synthesizer, used four of these ALU chips.

== Other uses ==
- Vectorbeam – Arcade game platform used by Cinematronics for various arcade games including Space Wars, Starhawk, Warrior, Star Castle and others. It uses three 25LS181 chips in its 12-bit processor.
- NorthStar Floating Point Board – S-100 bus BCD floating point accelerator introduced in 1977. It uses one 74LS181.

== See also ==
- Arithmetic logic unit
- Microsequencer
- 7400-series integrated circuits
- List of 7400-series integrated circuits
