= Silent Scope Complete =

2004 video game

- Developer: Konami
- Publisher: Konami
- Series: Silent Scope
- Platform: Xbox
- Release: NA: February 10, 2004; EU: March 19, 2004
- Genre: Rail shooter
- Modes: Single-player, Multiplayer

Silent Scope Complete is a compilation of the Silent Scope video game series developed by Konami. Released in 2004 for the Xbox, it brings together the four previous Silent Scope games, Silent Scope (1999), Silent Scope 2 (2000), Silent Scope EX (2001) and Silent Scope 3 (2002), while adding additional levels, story branches, and features. The player is a professional, government-supported sniper charged with foiling different terrorist attacks. Traveling between various locations, the player eliminates his adversaries with a high-power sniper rifle. Rewards are given for accuracy and speed, while players are punished for killing civilians or failing to complete a mission within the allotted time.

== Reception ==
Reception

Aggregate score
| Aggregator | Score |
|---|---|
| Metacritic | 69/100 |

Review scores
| Publication | Score |
|---|---|
| Electronic Gaming Monthly | 5.83/10 |
| Game Informer | 8/10 |
| GamePro | 4.5/5 |
| GameSpot | 5.4/10 |
| GameSpy | 3/5 |
| GameZone | 7.5/10 |
| IGN | 7/10 |
| Official Xbox Magazine (US) | 7.4/10 |
| TeamXbox | 7.4/10 |
| X-Play | 3/5 |

The game received "average" reviews according to the review aggregation website Metacritic.

While the arcade version of Silent Scope received praise for its unique peripheral (players used a model sniper rifle attached to the cabinet), this novelty did not translate into the console version, a fact which reviewers made strong mention of. Most reviews describe the game as mediocre, and attractive only to fans of the core series. Other reviewers noted that, while technically four different games, Silent Scope Complete falls victim to repetitive gameplay. Each mission is essentially the same, varying only in scenery and motive.
