= 1979 in video games =

1979 saw many sequels and prequels in video games, such as Space Invaders Part II and Super Speed Race, along with new titles such as Asteroids, Football, Galaxian, Head On, Heiankyo Alien, Monaco GP, Sheriff and Warrior. For the second year in a row, the highest-grossing video game was Taito's arcade game Space Invaders and the best-selling home system was the Atari Video Computer System (Atari VCS).

== Financial performance ==
=== Highest-grossing arcade games ===
Space Invaders was the top-grossing video game worldwide in 1979, having become the arcade game industry's all-time best-seller by 1979. The following table lists the year's top-grossing arcade game in Japan, the United Kingdom, United States, and worldwide.

Market	Title	Cabinet sales	Developer	Distributor	Genre	Ref
Japan	Space Invaders	300,000	Taito	Taito	Shoot 'em up	
United Kingdom	Space Invaders	Unknown (Note: Space Invaders sold 85,000 arcade cabinets in the United Kingdom between 1978 and 1979.)	Taito	Midway Manufacturing	Shoot 'em up	
United States	Space Invaders	55,000	Taito	Midway Manufacturing	Shoot 'em up	
Worldwide	Space Invaders	355,000+	Taito		Shoot 'em up	

==== Japan ====
In Japan, the following titles were the highest-grossing arcade games of 1979, according to the annual Game Machine chart. Taito's Space Invaders was the highest-grossing arcade game for a second year in a row.

Rank	Title	Points				Developer	Distributor	Genre	Cabinet sales
Rank	Title	#1	#2	#3	Total	Developer	Distributor	Genre	Cabinet sales
1	Space Invaders	40	4	3	131	Taito	Taito	Shoot 'em up	300,000
2	Galaxian	9	13	9	62	Namco	Namco	Shoot 'em up	Unknown
3	Monaco GP	9	11	8	57	Sega	Sega	Racing	Unknown
4	Head On	0	11	2	24	Sega/Gremlin	Sega	Maze	Unknown
5	Super Speed Race V	2	5	1	17	Taito	Taito	Racing	Unknown
6	Speed Race CL-5	0	1	4	6	Taito	Taito	Racing	Unknown
6	Space Chaser	0	2	2	6	Taito	Taito	Maze	Unknown
6	Special Dual	0	2	2	6	Sega/Gremlin	Sega	Compilation	Unknown
6	Space Stranger	2	0	0	6	Taito	Hoei Sangyo	Shoot 'em up	Unknown
10	Heiankyo Alien (Digger)	0	1	3	6	Theoretical Science Group	Denki Onkyō	Maze	Unknown
10	Sheriff (Bandido)	0	1	3	6	Nintendo R&D1	Nintendo	Shoot 'em up	Unknown

==== United States ====
The following titles were the top ten highest-grossing arcade video games of 1979 in the United States, according to Cash Box, Play Meter and RePlay magazines.

Rank	Cash Box	Play Meter	RePlay	Cabinet sales
1	Space Invaders			55,000
2	—N/a	Football		< 10,405
3	—N/a	Star Fire	Sprint 2	Unknown
4	—N/a	Space Wars	Head On	Unknown
5	—N/a	Head On	Star Hawk	Unknown
6	—N/a	Sprint 2	Space Wars	Unknown
7	—N/a	Crash	Star Fire	Unknown
8	—N/a	Super Breakout		Unknown
9	—N/a	Star Hawk	Crash	Unknown
10	—N/a	Video Pinball		Unknown

=== Best-selling home systems ===
Rank	System(s)	Manufacturer(s)	Type	Generation	Sales	Ref
1	Atari Video Computer System (Atari VCS)	Atari, Inc.	Console	Second	1,000,000	
2	Personal computer (PC)	Various	Computer	—N/a	580,000	
3	TRS-80	Tandy Corporation	Computer	8-bit	200,000	
4	NEC PC-8001	NEC	Computer	8-bit	150,000	
5	Atari 400 / Atari 800	Atari, Inc.	Computer	8-bit	100,000	
6	Commodore PET	Commodore International	Computer	8-bit	45,000	
7	Apple II	Apple Inc.	Computer	8-bit	35,000	

== Major awards ==
Electronic Games magazine hosted the first Arkie Awards in 1980, for games in 1979.

Award	Winner	Platform(s)
Game of the Year	Space Invaders	Arcade
Best Pong Variant	Video Olympics	Atari VCS
Best Sports Game	Football	Bally Professional Arcade
Best Target Game	Air-Sea Battle	Atari VCS
Best S.F. Game	Cosmic Conflict	Odyssey²
Best Solitaire Game	Golf	Odyssey²
Most Innovative Game	Basketball	Atari VCS
Best Audio and Visual Effects	Bally	Arcade / Bally

== Business ==
- New companies: Activision, Capcom, Edu-Ware, Infocom, Quicksilva, Strategic Simulations
- The US market for arcade games earn a revenue of $1.5 billion ($6.7 billion adjusted for inflation).
- The US home video game market generates a revenue of $330 million ($1.5 billion adjusted for inflation).

== Notable releases ==
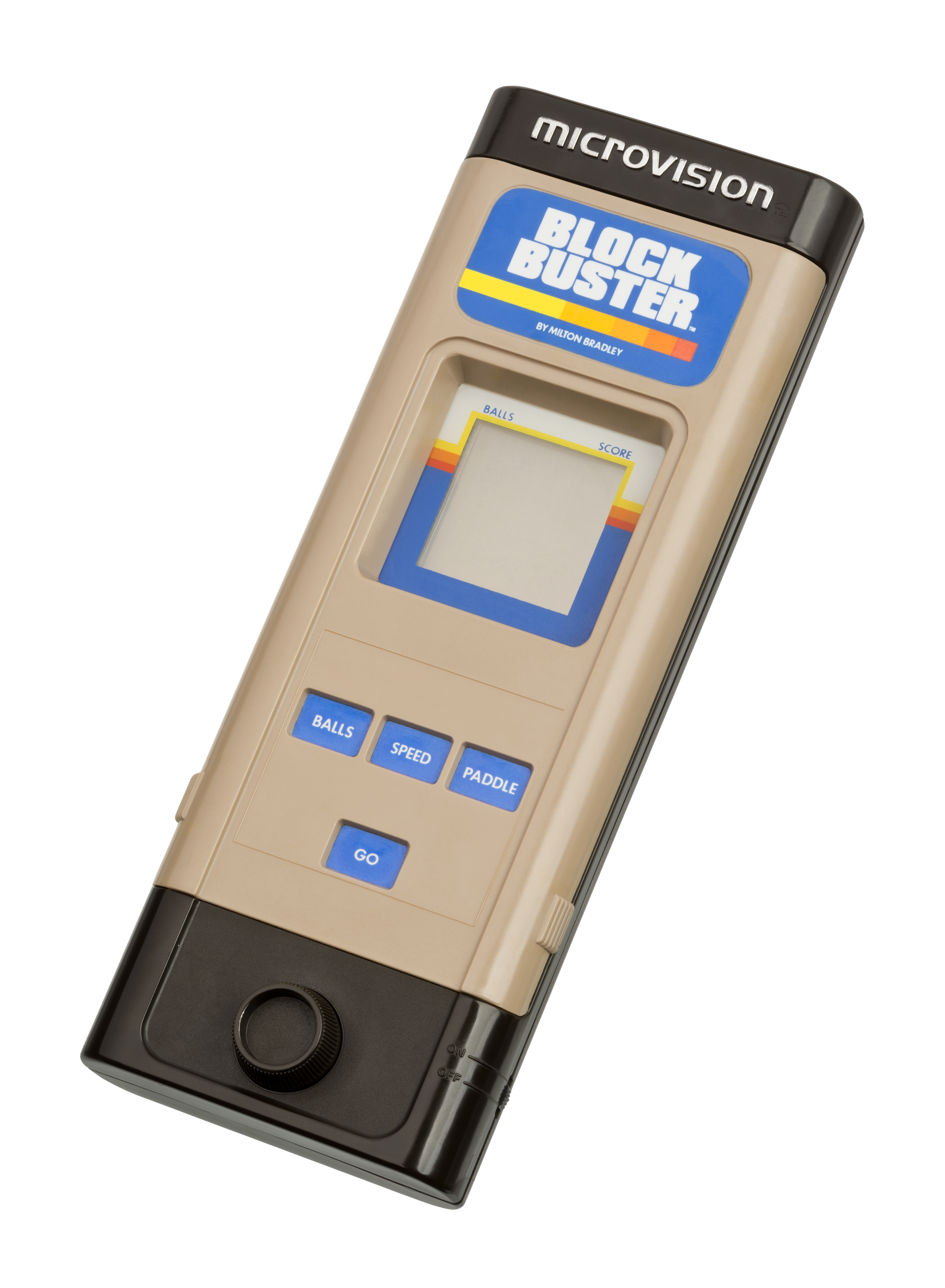
Microvision

=== Games ===
Arcade

- April – Sega's dot-eating driving game, Head On, is released. It becomes a popular concept to clone, especially for home systems.
- August – Atari releases Lunar Lander, the first arcade version of a game concept created on minicomputers ten years earlier.
- November – Atari releases the vector graphics-based Asteroids, which becomes Atari's second best selling game of all time and displaces Space Invaders as the most popular game in the US.
- November – Namco releases fixed shooter Galaxian in full color.
- November – Vectorbeam releases Tail Gunner, a space shooter with a first-person perspective.
- December – Nintendo releases Radar Scope, featuring a pseudo-3D, third-person perspective. Later, 2000 out of 3000 manufactured machines are converted to Donkey Kong.
- Cinematronics releases Warrior, one of the first fighting games without a boxing theme.
- Sega releases the vertically scrolling Monaco GP, featuring full color and day/night driving. It is one of Sega's last discrete logic (no CPU) hardware designs.

Computer

- August – Automated Simulations releases Temple of Apshai, one of the first graphical role-playing games for home computers. It remains the best-selling computer RPG through to 1982.
- October – subLOGIC releases Flight Simulator for the Apple II.
- Richard Garriott creates Akalabeth, a computer role-playing game for the Apple II. It launches Garriott's career and is a precursor to his highly successful Ultima series.
- Richard Bartle and Roy Trubshaw create what is commonly recognized as the first playable MUD.
- Atari, Inc.'s 8K Star Raiders cartridge is released and becomes a system seller for the new Atari 400/800 computer line.

=== Hardware ===
Computer

- June – Texas Instruments releases the TI-99/4. It is the first home computer with a 16-bit processor and, with TI's TMS9918 video chip, one of the first with hardware sprites.
- September – NEC releases the PC-8001, the first in the PC-8000 series of home computers.
- November – Atari, Inc. releases the first two models in the Atari 8-bit home computer series: the Atari 400 and Atari 800. They feature custom graphics and sound coprocessors which support sprites, four-channel audio, and programmable display modes.

Console

- Mattel test markets the Intellivision console in Fresno, California. It is released throughout the United States in 1980.

Handheld

- November – Milton Bradley Company releases the Microvision, the first handheld game console that uses interchangeable cartridges.

== See also ==
- 1979 in games
