= Tim Skelly =

Video game programmer (1951 - 2020)

Tim Skelly (February 10, 1951 – death reported March 2, 2020) was a video game designer and game programmer who developed arcade games for Cinematronics from 1978 until 1981. He designed a series of pure action games using black and white vector graphics. One of his early games, Rip Off, was the first arcade game with two-player cooperative play. Star Hawk, Rip Off, Armor Attack, and Star Castle were all later ported to the Vectrex home system.

After leaving Cinematronics, he worked briefly for Gremlin before becoming an independent contractor with Gottlieb. His first game for Gottlieb was the esoteric Reactor, and he had it written into his contract that he would get a credit on the title screen for designing the game.

Previously, programmers had occasionally sneaked their names into their games as easter eggs, and Berzerk designer Alan McNeil's signature was on every cabinet, but Reactor was the first coin-op to have the designer's name appear in-game with the manufacturer's blessing.

Skelly also designed two other games for Gottlieb, Insector and Screw Loose, which were never released. Later he worked for Incredible Technologies, then Microsoft Research. In 1983, a book of video game cartoons by Tim Skelly was published as Shoot the Robot, then Shoot Mom.

When Sega moved most of the development of Sonic the Hedgehog 2 to North America, Skelly joined the team and assisted with art and design of the game.

Later in his career, he worked on the popular Golden Tee arcade games.

Skelly died on March 2, 2020.

== Games ==
=== Design and/or programming ===
- Star Hawk
- Sundance
- Warrior
- Rip Off
- Armor Attack
- Star Castle, design
- Reactor
- Trivia Master, programming, graphic design
- BattleTech, software and hardware design for original game center in Chicago

=== Other roles ===
- Tail Gunner, producer, cabinet art
- Sonic the Hedgehog 2. design advisor, art director
- Slick Shot, graphic design
- Golden Tee Golf II, artwork
- Golden Par Golf, artwork

=== Unreleased games ===
- War of the Worlds
- Insector
- Screw Loose
