= Barrier (video game) =

1979 video game

- Developer: Cinematronics
- Publisher: Vectorbeam
- Designer: Rob Patton
- Platform: Arcade
- Release: August 1979
- Genre: Maze
- Modes: Single-player, multiplayer
- Arcade system: Cinematronics hardware

Barrier is an arcade video game developed by Rob Patton for Cinematronics and released in 1979 by Vectorbeam. It is an action game with a vector display.

== Gameplay ==
Players move a small triangle around the grid, while attempting to avoid the diamonds that are also moving around the grid. Reaching the end of the grid teleports the player back to the front of the grid to gain points. The game is played on a 3x10 grid that is displayed at angle to make it appear to be in 3-D. The base gameplay is essentially the same as in the Mattel Electronic Football (1977) LED handheld with the enemies in the same formation 3:1:1
