= Reactor (video game) =

1982 video game

- Atari 2600 box art
- Developer: Gottlieb
- Publishers: Gottlieb; 2600; Parker Brothers
- Designer: Tim Skelly
- Programmers: Tim Skelly; 2600; Charlie Heath
- Artist: Tim Skelly
- Composer: David Thiel
- Platforms: Arcade, Atari 2600
- Release: Arcade: NA: June 1982; 2600: January 1983
- Genre: Action
- Modes: Single-player, multiplayer

Reactor is a 1982 action game developed and published by Gottlieb for arcades. The object of the game is to cool down the core of a nuclear reactor without being pushed into its walls by swarms of subatomic particles. Reactor was developed by Tim Skelly, who previously designed and programmed a series of vector graphics arcade games for Cinematronics, including Rip Off. It was the first arcade game to credit the developer on the title screen. Reactor was ported to the Atari 2600 by Charlie Heath and published by Parker Brothers in 1983.

== Gameplay ==
Reactor on Atari 2600

Controls consist of a trackball and two buttons, Energy and Decoy. The player controls a ship that can move freely within a nuclear reactor, seen from the top down. Swarms of particles follow the player and bounce off each other, the player's ship, and the reactor core. Any object touching the outer "kill wall" of the reactor is destroyed. Pressing the Energy button during a collision with a particle will cause it to bounce away at a higher speed.

While touching the core is not harmful, it continually grows in size, restricting the available space for movement. Two sets of control rods protrude from the kill wall; if the player knocks particles into all the rods of one set, the core shrinks to its minimum size before starting to grow again. The player starts the game with a limited number of decoys, which can be deployed by pressing the Decoy button in order to lure particles toward the kill wall, control rods, or either of two small "bonus chambers" at opposite corners of the screen. An extra decoy is earned by knocking out both sets of rods.

The player earns points for destroying particles or luring/knocking them into the bonus chambers so that they bounce off the walls. A set number of particles must be destroyed in order to complete each level.

In later levels, the core is replaced by a slowly expanding vortex that can attract the player's ship and destroy it on contact. One or both of the bonus chambers may be briefly sealed off at times, and the kill wall turns invisible as well, becoming briefly illuminated when an object touches it.

One life is lost whenever the player's ship touches the kill wall or vortex. The game ends when all lives are lost, with bonus points awarded for each unused decoy.

== Ports ==
The Atari 2600 version can be played with either a joystick or a trackball, though the latter is not mentioned in the manual. The difficulty switches set the sensitivity of the controls. There are no voice overs, and the bonus counter is invisible.

An Intellivision version was licensed and developed, but never released.

== Reception ==
Tilt gave the game 93%, calling it "a classic Gottlieb game that relies on physics for its gameplay, which is quite rewarding."

A reviewer for Hi-Res magazine wrote of the Atari 2600 version, "VCS Reactor's main flaw is not in the game itself, but the flexibility of the controlling joystick. The trackball controller of the Gottlieb version is gone, replaced by the lackluster Atari joystick. The stiffness of the joystick makes it difficult to direct your ship with any great degree of precision."
