= Solar Quest =

1981 video game

- Vectrex box art
- Developer: Cinematronics
- Publisher: Cinematronics
- Designer: Scott Boden
- Platforms: Arcade, Vectrex
- Release: Arcade: NA: December 1981; Vectrex: NA: October 1982; EU: 1983
- Genre: Multidirectional shooter
- Modes: Single-player, multiplayer

Solar Quest is a monochrome vector arcade video game created by Cinematronics in 1981. It was designed and programmed by Scott Boden, who previously worked on Star Castle. It had a home release for the Vectrex system in 1982.

== Gameplay ==
The player controls a ship that can rotate to the left and right and thrust forward, similarly to Asteroids; like that game, the player also has a "hail mary" device, hyperspace. In the center of the screen is the sun, which pulls objects into it in a fashion similar to Spacewar!. The screen wraps at the edges.

Waves of enemy spaceships appear in groups of up to eight. There are seven different types of ships, growing smaller to make them harder to hit. Each "phase" of the gameplay completes when each of the seven waves is destroyed. The spaceships are a collision hazard and normally fly around the screen randomly. As the game progresses, they become more likely to attempt to ram the player directly. At higher levels, the ships gain weapons and attempt to shoot the player.

The player's ship is armed with two weapons, a cannon and a "nuke". The cannon fires a single shot in the direction your ship is pointed, and the game allows up to four shots on screen at once. The nuke destroys all ships in the area when it is triggered, which occurs with a second button press after being launched from the ship. The player's ship starts the game with three nukes and gains a new one every 10000 points.

Whenever an alien ship is destroyed, a "survivor" is left drifting in space. The player can collect the survivors by flying his ship over them. Alternately he can shoot them, or allow them to fall into the Sun. The player is awarded with points for successful rescues, and eventually free ships.

== Development ==
Solar Quest uses the "classic" monochrome Cinematronics chassis introduced with Space Wars, and used a colored plastic overlay to produce a yellow sun, blue play field, and red scoring information at the top. The game was originally intended to be based on a true color display, but was released in monochrome.
