= Sundance (video game) =

1979 video game

- Screenshot
- Developer: Cinematronics
- Publisher: Cinematronics
- Designer: Tim Skelly
- Platform: Arcade
- Release: 1979
- Genre: Puzzle
- Modes: Single-player, 2 players alternating
- Arcade system: Cinematronics hardware

Sundance is a puzzle arcade video game using vector graphics released by Cinematronics in 1979. The game consists of two grids floating in a pseudo-3D space with small suns bouncing between them.

== Gameplay ==
The player scores points by opening a hole in the grid to capture the suns as they danced/bounced. The player can shoot a nova from an open hole, thereby saving time by not having to wait for the sun to bounce into the hole. If the nova misses the sun, it bounces between grids until it is swallowed up into an open hole. There can only be one nova on the screen at any given time. As the suns bounced, the grids moves closer and closer, making gameplay more difficult. The game ends when the grids fully converged.

== Release ==
The game had only a small production run and was plagued with hardware failures due to its unconventional design. According to Tim Skelly, the game's designer, Sundance used an additional daughterboard that controlled the intensity of certain vectors. This board and its connections were rather fragile and prone to failure. Also, the monitor used a defective carbon coating spray which tended to cause the monitor's tube to arc if it was left in a certain position, destroying the monitor.
