= Silent Scope 2 =

2000 video game

Silent Scope 2: Fatal Judgement
- European PlayStation 2 box art
- Developer: Konami
- Publisher: Konami
- Director: Masaaki Kukino
- Designer: Takeshi Uchi
- Series: Silent Scope
- Platforms: Arcade, PlayStation 2
- Release: Arcade: NA: March 2000; JP: June 2000; EU: 2000; PlayStation 2: NA: September 12, 2001; JP: October 18, 2001; EU: November 16, 2001
- Genre: Rail shooter
- Modes: Single-player, multiplayer
- Arcade system: Konami Hornet

Silent Scope 2 (Note: Subtitled Fatal Judgement in Europe, Dark Silhouette in North America, and Innocent Sweeper (Silent Scope 2: Innocent Sweeper (サイレントスコープ2 INNOCENT SWEEPER, Sairento Sukōpu Tsū Inosento Suwīpā) in Japan) is a 2000 rail shooter video game developed and published by Konami for arcades. It is the sequel to the 1999 game Silent Scope.

== Plot ==
The player first battles a few enemies along Tower Bridge, London, most of them found on distant buildings, in boats, or on the bridge itself. Afterwards, the player meets his counterpart, either Jackal or Falcon (whichever the player did not choose). According to the player's unseen commander, a bioweapons research facility on the continent has been taken over by the terrorists and its staff held hostage, including Laura, one of the scientists whom Falcon had recently been dating (and whom he finds out is also the sister of his counterpart).

The player is then sent to the research facility, and kills several snow based enemies. The player then battles the first boss, Tanya, who uses a burner to scorch the player. Afterwards, the player is sent outside the snow base, battles more enemies, then battles another boss, Fox.

After completing the snow missions, the player is sent to recover a stolen airplane, and afterwards, faces another boss, Cobra, who seemed to have survived the previous encounter in Silent Scope and claims to be immortal. The player is then sent to a ruins-like location with a river near it. The boss, The Collector, is more challenging than the previous ones, as he has full body armor and has a tank as well as several fire arms as weapons.

The player then goes to an opera house and battles another boss, the Star. The boss tries to launch the missile, leaving the device tied to the hostages, but Falcon and Jackal carefully cancel the launch by shooting devices. Finally, the player is sent to the enemy's base and battles a pair of ninja-like bosses, Sho and Kane, before facing the big boss, who is on a top of a clock tower with Laura as his prisoner. However, the boss suddenly falls down, but his handcuffs are still attached to the prisoner, the player must shoot the handcuffs. The big boss then falls to his death, and the game ends.

== Reception ==
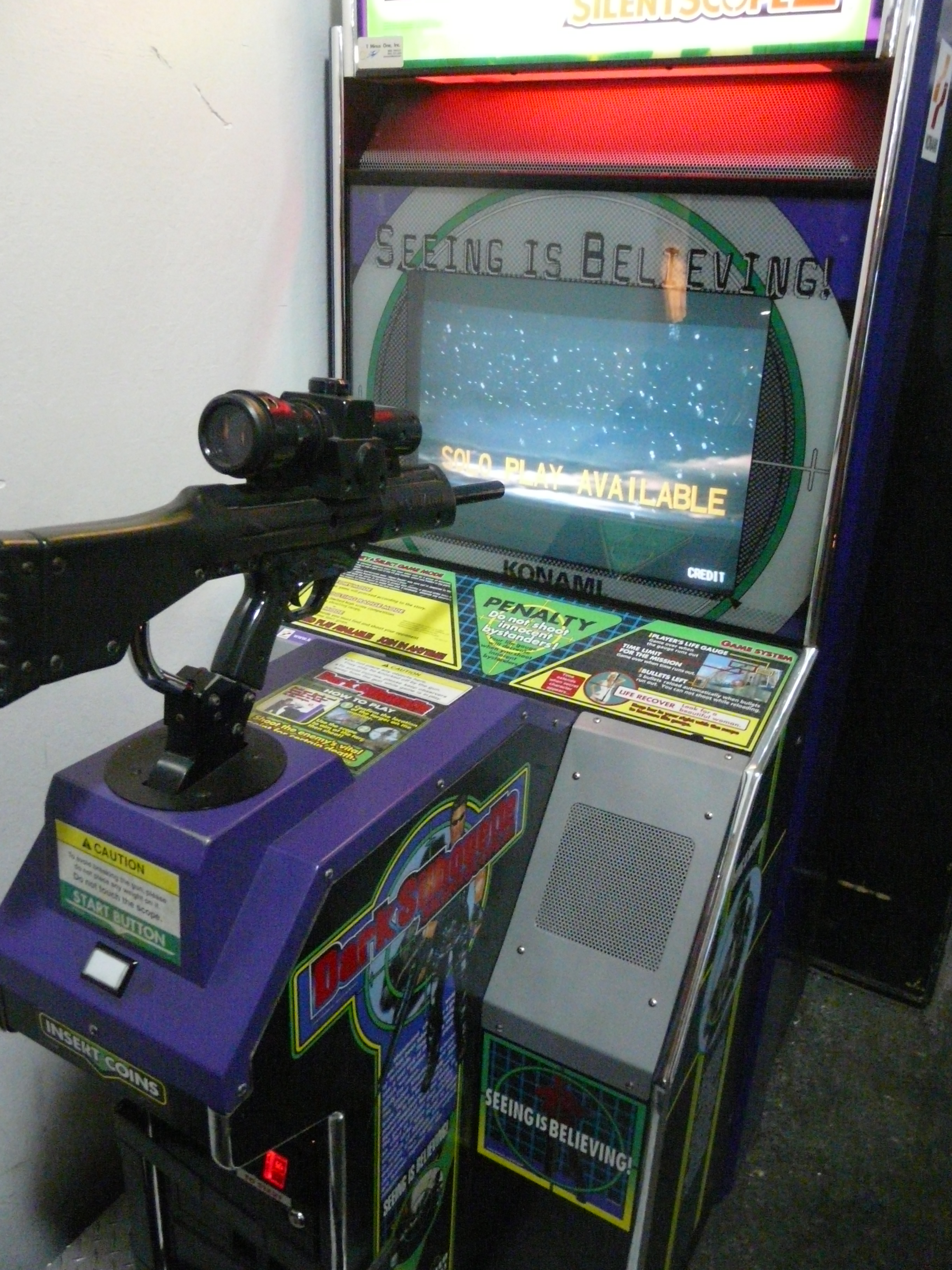
Arcade cabinet

Reception

Aggregate score
| Aggregator | Score |
|---|---|
| Metacritic | 64/100 |

Review scores
| Publication | Score |
|---|---|
| AllGame | (ARC) 3.5/5 |
| Edge | 5/10 |
| Electronic Gaming Monthly | 6/10 |
| Famitsu | 29/40 |
| Game Informer | 8/10 |
| GamePro | 4/5 |
| GameRevolution | C− |
| GameSpot | 5.1/10 |
| GameSpy | 80% |
| GameZone | 7.3/10 |
| IGN | 6.7/10 |
| Next Generation | 1/5 |
| Official U.S. PlayStation Magazine | 3.5/5 |

The PlayStation 2 version received "mixed" reviews according to the review aggregation website Metacritic. Jeff Lundrigan of NextGen called it "a waste of anyone's time and money". In Japan, however, Famitsu gave it a score of 29 out of 40.

Also in Japan, Game Machine listed the arcade version on their August 15, 2000, issue as being the fourteenth most-successful dedicated arcade game of the month.
