= Zzyzzyxx =

1982 video game

- Arcade flyer
- Developer: Advanced Microcomputer Systems
- Publisher: Cinematronics
- Platform: Arcade
- Release: NA: November 1982
- Genre: Platform
- Modes: Single-player, multiplayer

Zzyzzyxx is a 1982 platform game developed by Advanced Microcomputer Systems and published by Cinematronics for arcades. It was retitled Brix for release as a conversion kit in 1983; the title screen and marquee were the only changes.

== Gameplay ==
The object of the game is to guide the protagonist, named Zzyzzyxx, through a moving maze of bricks to collect gifts and bring them to the fair-haired Lola, the object of his affection. Zzyzzyxx is opposed by the evil trio by the names Boris, Bluto and Smoot, also known as the Rattifers. These three will try to intercept Zzyzzyxx as he makes his way through the maze. He can collect a helmet in the maze, which can be used to imprison a Rattifer inside a brick, or to break a brick in the row above to move through the maze. As the levels progress, Zzyzzyxx must avoid crumbling bricks, rising missiles, and dropping bombs. The game has a 1up player score and laps tallied at the top of the screen.
