= Cosmic Conflict =

1978 video game

Cosmic Conflict!
- Developer: Philips
- Publishers: Magnavox, Philips
- Designer: Sam Overton
- Platforms: Odyssey²/Videopac; Philips Videopac+
- Release: Odyssey²: PAL: 1978; NA: October 1979; Videopac+: PAL: 1983
- Genre: Shoot 'em up
- Mode: Single-player

Cosmic Conflict!, known in Europe as Videopac 11 - Cosmic Conflict, is a 1978 first-person shoot 'em up video game created by Sam Overton for the Magnavox Odyssey², also known as the Philips Videopac G7000. It was published by Magnavox and Philips and later rereleased for the Philips Videopac+ G7400. The player is a commander of the Centurion, an Earth Federation starship that guards a remote corner of the galaxy and defends against an invading alien fleet trying to enslave the Earth. It is frequently criticized for being too easy and for ending after only fifteen enemies are destroyed.

== Gameplay ==
Cosmic Conflict is a 2D shoot 'em up played from a first-person perspective set in outer space. The player controls the reticle of a laser cannon and must shoot down as many enemy ships as they can before the ship's energy supply runs out. The player encounters two different types of enemy ships, transports, which travel across the screen either horizontally or diagonally, and starfighters, which can teleport using a warp drive and rush the player head on. In total, there are ten transports and five starfighters. Energy supplies tick down over time but are also spent if the player fires their laser or gets shot by rushing starfighters.

A screenshot of the player being rushed by an enemy starfighter

== Reception ==
Reception

Review scores
| Publication | Score |
|---|---|
| Electronic Fun with Computers & Games | A |
| Electronic Games 1983 Software Encyclopedia | 7/10 |
| Tilt | 2/3 |

In the "Arcade Alley" column of Video magazine it was praised as "a classic space battle that brings the flavor of Star Wars to the home screen". Arcade Alley awarded Cosmic Conflict with the title of "Best Science Fiction Game" of 1979 in their First Annual Arcade Awards.

JoyStik: How to Win at Home Video Games considered the game to offer "little challenge to all but the most experienced players". They gave the game a five out of ten in gameplay, graphics, and longevity. Paul Kupperberg writing for Video Action called the game "lots of fun." French magazine Tilt in 1983 considered it to be enjoyable but outdated. In 2011, Brett Weiss wrote in Classic Home Video Games, 1972-1984 that it was "terribly easy" and that it "offers little in the way of challenge or longevity."

== See also ==
- Star Fire
- Tail Gunner
