= Speed Freak =

1979 video game

- Developer: Vectorbeam
- Publisher: Vectorbeam
- Designer: Larry Rosenthal
- Platform: Arcade
- Release: March 1979
- Genre: Racing
- Mode: Single-player
- Arcade system: Vectorbeam hardware

Speed Freak is a monochrome vector arcade game created by Vectorbeam in 1979. Along with Atari, Inc.'s Night Driver and Bally Midway's Datsun 280 ZZZAP–both from 1976–it is one of the earliest first-person driving games and the first such game known to use vector graphics.

== Gameplay ==
Gameplay screenshot

The game is a behind-the-wheel driving simulation where the driver speeds down a winding computer-generated road past other cars, hitchhikers, trees, cows and cacti. Occasionally a plane will fly overhead towards the screen. One must avoid crashing into these objects and complete the race in the allotted time. The player can crash as many times as he wants before the time runs out and players were treated to two different crash animations. The first was a simple cracked windshield effect, the second was a crash where the car explodes into car parts that fly through the air.
