= Jack the Giantkiller =

1982 platforming arcade game

- Developers: Cinematronics; Hara Industries
- Publishers: Cinematronics; Hara Industries (Japan)
- Platform: Arcade
- Release: 1982
- Genre: Platform
- Modes: Single-player, multiplayer

Jack the Giantkiller is a 1982 arcade game developed and published by Cinematronics. It is based on the 19th-century English fairy tale "Jack and the Beanstalk". In Japan, the game was released as Treasure Hunt. There were no home console ports.

The player controls Jack, who must climb the beanstalk to reach the castle, steal a series of treasures from the giant, and escape. The game used hardware licensed from Hara Industries of Japan, with raster graphics instead of the vector displays Cinematronics was known for.

Nicknamed "Jack the Company Killer", the game was a commercial failure and financial disaster. Cinematronics filed for Chapter 11 bankruptcy protection in 1982.

== Gameplay ==
The player uses an eight-way joystick to move Jack. Two buttons are available to allow Jack to jump or throw beans at enemies.

The cycle of screens includes:

- Scaling the beanstalk. The player may use the supply of beans (limited, with his supply indicated by a counter at the corner of the screen) to hit and destroy an enemy for points. Jack may also jump from one branch to another, either to gain a new path or avoid an enemy. The player is given a supply of beans to start, and may obtain more by moving Jack over the beans that appear along the way. Going into the house in this stage will kill Jack.
- Walking across clouds to reach the castle's drawbridge, dodging lions and other enemies that try to throw Jack off the tightrope course. The player may enter the castle only when the drawbridge is lowered.
- The Giant's lair, which includes ascending stairs to reach the table where the giant's treasures are kept; the giant is seen sleeping at the table. The most frequent challenge is navigating the gaps between staircases (the player must jump across) while dodging flying magic lamps and collecting eggs laid by the golden goose. In the more difficult levels, cats and mice will also appear, which the player must avoid or hit with beans to collect points, and the staircases are narrower. Again, Jack's defenses are avoiding the enemies, jumping over them or using the magic beans.
- Descending the beanstalk. In addition to facing the critters in the previous beanstalk stage, Jack must also avoid falling rocks.

The treasures to be stolen include a musical harp, a golden goose, a bag of gold coins and the princess. The player's objective is to retrieve these items on successive trips up the beanstalk, with the princess stage being the last in the four-stage level. A brief animated intermission featuring that specific treasure will play after the player successfully reaches the ground to end each stage. After taking the princess, the giant will awaken, and it is up to the player to descend the beanstalk and chop it down before the giant reaches the ground.

Completing a level results in a bonus and the player getting to repeat the cycle at increased difficulty.

== Development ==
Cinematronics president Fred Fukumoto purchased 5,000 game boards from Hara Industries, for 2 million US dollars, to be used for Jack the Giantkiller. The hardware came without documentation and had to be reverse engineered.
