= Computer Golf! =

1979 video game

- European box art
- Developer: Magnavox
- Publishers: NA: Magnavox; PAL: Philips
- Designer: Sam Overton
- Platform: Odyssey²/Videopac
- Release: NA: July 1979; PAL: 1980
- Genre: Sports (Golf)
- Modes: Single-player, Multi-player

Computer Golf!, released in Europe as Videopac 10 - Golf, is a 1979 golf simulation video game. The game was released by Magnavox and Philips for the Magnavox Odyssey², also known as the Philips Videopac G7000. The game features a nine-hole course golf course where players control the angle of their golf strokes by moving a player character around the map and control the power of their strokes by holding down the action button. The game was heavily praised at the time of its release for its graphical flourishes and is considered one of the best sports titles in the Odyssey²'s library.

== Gameplay ==
Computer Golf! is a simulation of the sport of golf featuring a nine-hole course. Players move a golfer around using the joystick and hold down the action button to charge a backswing. The position of the player in regards to the ball controls the angle of the stroke and the length of time the button is held affects its strength. There are a number of hazards to avoid including trees and rough. When the ball reaches the putting green, the viewpoint changes to focus in on the hole. If the player hits a tree with the ball, the player character performs a brief animation of smashing their club on the ground.

== Reception ==
Reception

Review scores
Publication	Score
Electronic Fun with Computers & Games	D
Electronic Games 1983 Software Encyclopedia	9/10
Tilt	2/3

"Arcade Alley", written by Bill Kunkel and Arnie Katz for Video magazine, called the game "a must" for those that enjoyed playing real life golf. They enjoyed the way the view swaps when reaching the green and the animation flourishes when the golfer character hits a tree with his ball. In the column's first Annual Arcade Awards, Computer Golf! received the award for "Best Solitaire Game". Electronic Games, also edited by Kunkel and Katz, reviewed the game in 1981 and said "it created quite a stir of admiration when it first appeared, and it remains an outstanding cartridge today." How to Win at Video Games: A Complete Guide by George Sullivan said it was "one of the best of all the [Odyssey²] sports-game cartridges."

The Winners' Book of Video Games by Craig Kubey called the game "terrible" and said customers "should take care when buying the company's cartridges regardless of the claims made about them." He criticized the game for being unrealistic and said that it was hard to get the ball where you want it to go.

French magazine Tilt found the scenery to be crisp and the gameplay enjoyable.
