= Sport Fishing 2 =

1995 video game

- Developer: Ryobi
- Publisher: Sega
- Platform: Arcade
- Release: 1995
- Genres: Fishing; Simulation
- Arcade system: ST-V

Sport Fishing 2 is a fishing simulation video game developed by Ryobi and published by Sega for the arcades in 1995. It is the sequel to Sports Fishing (1994).

== Gameplay ==
Sport Fishing 2 is a game in which the player uses a deep-sea fishing rod, which simulates the feel of fish pulling on the line.

== Development and release ==
The game is the sequel to the original Sports Fishing. The first fishing simulation game was not distributed in a cartridge and CD-ROM, but only distributed in a ROM Board, composed of the ST-V motherboard and Laserdisc, released in 1994. The original Sports Fishing was Japan's sixth highest-grossing dedicated arcade cabinet of 1995.

The sequel to the fishing simulation game, Sport Fishing 2, was distributed directly in a cartridge and CD-ROM with the ST-V motherboard as a standard and is somewhat similar to the Saturn console. The game Sport Fishing 2 was more successful than the previous one.

== Reception ==
In Japan, Game Machine listed Sports Fishing 2 on their September 15, 1995 issue as being the third most-successful dedicated arcade game of the month. Next Generation reviewed the arcade version of the game, rating it three stars out of five, and stated that "like the unlucky soul we saw playing the game, when one out of two catches is a chunk of driftwood, you may bring that primal urge to a cool fighting or driving game instead of going fishing in FMV."

== Reviews ==
- Ultima Generacion 09
- Player One Magazine
