= Armor Attack =

1981 video game

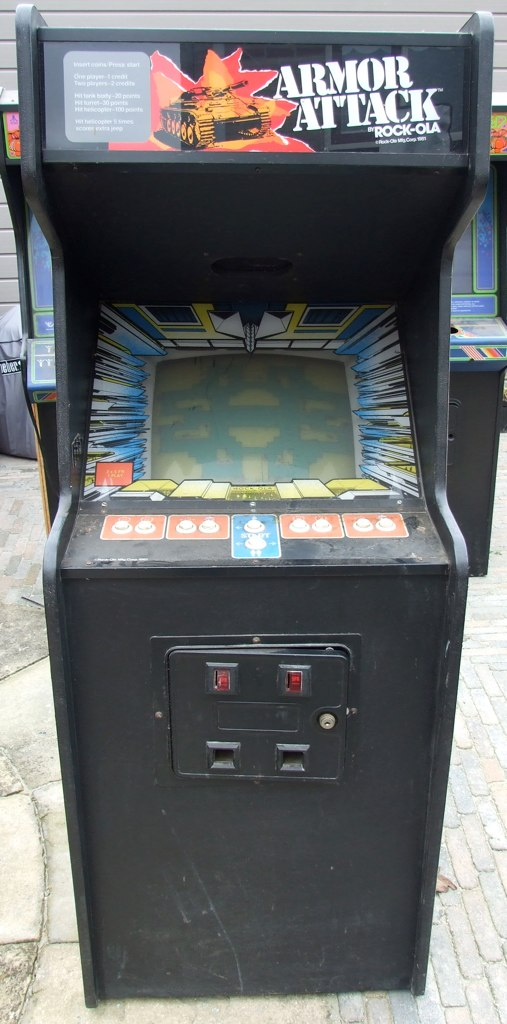
- Rock-Ola arcade machine
- Developer: Cinematronics
- Publishers: Cinematronics; Rock-Ola; Sega (Japan)
- Designer: Tim Skelly
- Platforms: Arcade, Vectrex
- Release: Arcade: NA: June 1981; Vectrex; October 1982
- Genre: Multidirectional shooter
- Modes: Single-player, multiplayer

Armor Attack is a multidirectional shooter designed by Tim Skelly and released as an arcade video game by Cinematronics in 1981. It was licensed to Sega for release in Japan and also to Rock-Ola. The vector graphics of Armor Attack present combat between the player's jeep and enemy vehicles in an overhead, maze-like view of a town. The buildings are not drawn in the game, but are an overlay that sits on top of the monitor. The overlay also tints the vectors green.

Armor Attack was released for the Vectrex in 1982.

== Gameplay ==
The visuals are stark without the monitor overlay.

One button rotates the jeep clockwise, while a second button rotates counterclockwise. A third button simulates the gas pedal and moves the jeep forward. A fourth button is used for firing a rocket launcher that shoots straight ahead. The player can have two rockets in the air at a time.

Tanks periodically spawn from different locations on the edge of the screen and drive towards the player. The tanks always travel along horizontal or vertical lines, unlike the freely moving jeep. Tank turrets move to track the player, allowing them to shoot in any direction. Tanks normally take two hits to kill, and the player can have only two rockets on the screen at a time. The helicopter spawns from any point, and approaches the player in looping paths flying over the jeep and periodically firing. If hit, the helicopter spirals in. Destroying the helicopter rewards the player with an extra life.

The player can be killed by being shot by either the tanks or helicopter, or by colliding with the tanks. In two-player mode, the players can not kill each other. Gameplay periodically speeds up to increase the difficulty.

== Reception ==
David H. Ahl of Creative Computing Video & Arcade Games praised the "amazing realism" of the enemy helicopter in the Vectrex version.
