= Scion (video game) =

1984 video game

- Arcade flyer
- Developer: Seibu Denshi
- Publishers: JP: Sigma Enterprises; NA: Cinematronics
- Platform: Arcade
- Release: JP: February 1984; NA: December 1984
- Genre: Scrolling shooter
- Modes: Single-player, multiplayer

Scion (Note: Japanese: サイオン, Hepburn: Saion) is a 1984 vertically scrolling shooter video game developed by Seibu Denshi for arcades. It was released in Japan by Sigma Enterprises in February 1984 and in North America by Cinematronics in December 1984. Hamster Corporation released the game as part of their Arcade Archives series for the Nintendo Switch and PlayStation 4, as well as their Arcade Archives 2 series for the Nintendo Switch 2, PlayStation 5 and Xbox Series X/S in October 2025.

== Gameplay ==
The player controls a spaceship who attempts to rescue the pilot's friends in a sprawling megacity. Each level loops around a layer of the city, which is held together by loose points only bombs can destroy. The player must defeat enemies until the bomb item is found, allowing the layer to be torn off and the level be cleared.
