= Spinal Breakers =

1991 video game

- Arcade flyer
- Developer: V-System
- Publishers: JP: V-System; NA: Sammy Corporation
- Platform: Arcade
- Release: JP: January 1991; NA: April 1991
- Genre: Shooting gallery
- Modes: Single-player, multiplayer

Spinal Breakers (Note: Japanese: スパイナルブレーカーズ, Hepburn: Supainaru Burēkāzu) is a 1991 shooting gallery video game developed and published by V-System for arcades. It was released in Japan in January 1991 and in North America in April 1991 by Sammy Corporation. Hamster Corporation acquired the game's rights alongside Video System's properties, releasing the game as part of their Arcade Archives series for the Nintendo Switch and PlayStation 4 in June 2025.

== Gameplay ==
Players control time-traveling soldier Colonel Waffle, who must defeat people infected by an artificial life form named Hildroid while navigating levels set in a number of locations and time periods such as Nazi Germany, Shaolin Monastery, Russia during the Stone Age, Ancient Greece, Ancient Egypt, Japan during the Sengoku period and eventually the United States in 1980. The player moves through an automatically scrolling level while shooting enemies, blowing them up with bombs and dodging bullets. Obstacles can be destroyed to acquire extra ammunition, bombs or bonus points. Three different endings are available depending on the player's performance.
