= Silent Scope 3 =

2002 video game

- European PlayStation 2 box art
- Developer: Konami
- Publisher: Konami
- Director: Masaaki Kukino
- Designer: Takeshi Uchi
- Series: Silent Scope
- Platform: PlayStation 2
- Release: NA: October 15, 2002; JP: October 17, 2002; EU: January 10, 2003
- Genre: Rail shooter
- Mode: Single-player
- Arcade system: Konami Viper

Silent Scope 3 (サイレントスコープ3, Sairento Sukōpu 3) is a 2002 rail shooter video game developed and published by Konami for the PlayStation 2. It is the fourth game in the Silent Scope series. The 2001 arcade game Silent Scope EX is included with the game.

== Gameplay ==
As in the previous games in the series, the player primarily controls a large sniper rifle. One rather notable feature of the home console version of Silent Scope 3 is the fact that a gun controller is not featured. The arcade game, Silent Scope EX, is included in the game. The main objective is for the character to continuously head to different areas such as at the top of the building on rails as to set a specific vantage point. While at this new vantage point, they will be tasked to silently shoot the various enemies that appear before their scope. There is a constant time limit, and killing enemies adds time. After the first mission is completed, the player has the freedom to choose if they are allowed to either lock on to their enemy or not. R1 and L2 can also be useful by changing the player's set vantage point.

== Plot ==
The game opens with Falcon raiding a drug smuggling ring at a harbor. He also battles with Cobra once again. The reason for Falcon working with Marine Colonel Robert is that the terrorists have kidnapped cloning researcher Dr. Scott, and hope to use that cloning to set off a genocide plot. Falcon's objective is to capture the terrorist cells. He first heads to a research lab to rescue hostages that are meant to work with Dr. Scott and fights a flying assassin named Mosquito. The terrorists try to retake the weapons that were seized at the port out to sea, but Falcon intervenes and shoots down an armed plane piloted by Smith. He next infiltrates a casino fronted by the terrorists for cash operations. Falcon also has to fight the casino's owner, Shaker. The terrorists then try to blow a dam bringing along a mercenary named Bull. Col. Robert also hears of profits being made for oil, as terrorists are drilling for it. Falcon shuts down the operation and fights another sniper named Ray. The weapons that would have been exported were produced at an ironworks factory that was overtaken by the terrorist gang. The sniper infiltrates and captures the factory then fights a rocket launcher assassin named Charly.

Finally, at the enemy base, Falcon infiltrates and fights through guards and trying to find the kidnapped doctor. When he meets the Big Boss, the villain informs him Dr. Scott served his purpose and is no longer reliable. The Big Boss sets the base to self-destruct and sends his fastest assassin, The Stinger out to fight Falcon. After the battle, Falcon chases the Big Boss to a launch bay and has to stop him before he escapes.

At the end of the credits, if the player completed the game without continues, Col. Robert congratulates Falcon on a successful mission. Falcon feels he failed to secure the doctor, but is told Dr. Scott is at Robert's lab finishing up the clone weapons project. The Marine Colonel then admits the truth that when the doctor was kidnapped, the government started an investigation. Robert was worried when they found out about the clone weapons. The colonel, the true villain behind the terrorist organization, stepped forward to neutralize the threat as the Commanding Officer. With the government believing the threat had been eliminated, Robert could freely plan for world domination. Angry at being used, Falcon has one last sniper duel with the colonel.

== Reception ==
Reception

Aggregate score
Aggregator	Score
Metacritic	61/100

Review scores
Publication	Score
Electronic Gaming Monthly	5.5/10
Famitsu	29/40
Game Informer	7.75/10
GamePro	4/5
GameRevolution	C
GameSpot	5/10
GameSpy	3/5
IGN	4/10
Jeuxvideo.com	13/20
Official U.S. PlayStation Magazine	3.5/5

Silent Scope 3 received "mixed" reviews according to the review aggregation website Metacritic. In Japan, Famitsu gave it a score of 29 out of 40.
