= Silent Scope (video game) =

1999 video game

- North American arcade flyer
- Developer: Konami (Note: Game Boy Advance version developed by Now Production.)
- Publishers: WW: Konami; JP: KCET (PS2)
- Directors: Masaaki Kukino; Shigenobu Matsuyama
- Producer: Shigenobu Matsuyama
- Designer: Masaaki Kukino
- Programmer: Hardboiler Shin.
- Composer: Jimmy Weckl
- Series: Silent Scope
- Platforms: Arcade, Dreamcast, PlayStation 2, Game Boy Advance, mobile phone, iOS
- Release: July 1999: Arcade; NA: July 1999; JP: August 1999 Dreamcast; JP: October 12, 2000; NA: October 23, 2000; EU: November 17, 2000 PlayStation 2; NA: October 26, 2000; JP: November 16, 2000; EU: November 24, 2000 Game Boy Advance; NA: September 4, 2002; JP: October 17, 2002; EU: January 10, 2003 Mobile April 2005 iOS April 23, 2009
- Genre: Rail shooter
- Modes: Single-player, multiplayer
- Arcade system: Konami Hornet

Silent Scope (サイレントスコープ, Sairento Sukōpu) is a 1999 rail shooter video game developed and published by Konami for arcades. The game puts the player in the shoes of a sniper during a series of terrorist incidents. It is the first in the Silent Scope series.

== Plot ==
The U.S. First Family, including the President of the United States, returns from a function in Chicago when their convoy is ambushed by terrorists. In the resulting confusion, the terrorists manage to capture the entire First Family, and are demanding the release of their leader (the dictator) in exchange for the safe return of the president. Washington officials have decided to resolve the problem quietly, using military force.

The player assists police at the scene of the kidnapping, from several high rise structures and after making a choice on tactics, the player defeats one of the terrorist leaders and manages to rescue the president's daughter in the process. Next the player pursues a terrorist boss in order to safely rescue the President's Wife. Finally, the player makes an invasive entry into the terrorist base. After fighting through the heavily guarded mansion, the player defeats Monica and liberates the President himself. However, the dictator is making a getaway and the player exhausts nearly an entire magazine on bulletproof glass and has only one bullet left to eliminate the dictator.

== Gameplay ==
The game uses a rifle that is mounted on the console, requiring players to physically alter their position in order to shoot accurately. In addition, the rifle's scope displays a close-up view of a small portion of the screen, representing the sniper's long-range view of the area where the rifle is pointed. Certain stage areas are dark and require players to use night vision scopes to spot and shoot opponents. The player can fire five shots in succession before reloading is required.

Players have limited time and health during gameplay. Extra time can be gained by killing certain enemies, while training the scope on an attractive woman awards extra health and bonus points. The game consists of three stages corresponding with the members of the First Family. In each stage, the player(s) must kill as many enemies as possible in short time facing sub bosses along the way and a large boss at the end. Unless a precise, lethal head shot is made, it will take more than one bullet to kill a sub-boss or boss. Enemies can shoot the player if they are not killed fast enough. Players must take care not to shoot innocent civilians in the crossfire. During game stages the player is able to choose one of two (easy, hard) or three (easy, medium or hard) paths to progress, facing a different boss and doing a different following mission depending on the choice made.

Points are scored based on where an opponent is hit, multiplied by the number of successful shots the player has made. In arcade mode, the best points are given for headshots, but on the practice range, bonus points are obtained for shooting the human shaped targets' guns.

The home versions have a cheat code where one can exchange life for time and vice versa. There are also secret codes for all versions that will make the game more difficult, such as hiding target indicators on enemies.

== Reception ==
Reception

Aggregate scores
Aggregator	Score					
Aggregator	Arcade	Dreamcast	GBA	iOS	mobile	PS2
GameRankings	N/A	71%	75%	38%	N/A	67%
Metacritic	N/A	63/100	70/100	N/A	N/A	63/100

Review scores
Publication	Score					
Publication	Arcade	Dreamcast	GBA	iOS	mobile	PS2
AllGame	4/5	4/5	2.5/5	N/A	N/A	2/5
CNET Gamecenter	N/A	7/10	N/A	N/A	N/A	7/10
Electronic Gaming Monthly	N/A	7/10	N/A	N/A	N/A	7/10 (Note: Three critics of Electronic Gaming Monthly gave the PlayStation 2 version each a score of 6.5/10, 7/10, and 7.5/10.)
Eurogamer	N/A	N/A	N/A	N/A	N/A	6/10
Famitsu	N/A	N/A	23/40	N/A	N/A	N/A
Game Informer	8.75/10	7.5/10	N/A	N/A	N/A	7.75/10
GameFan	N/A	N/A	N/A	N/A	N/A	83% (Note: In GameFan's viewpoint of the PlayStation 2 version, three critics gave it each a score of 73, 89, and 87.) (MVS) 70%
GameRevolution	N/A	N/A	N/A	N/A	N/A	C−
GameSpot	N/A	4.6/10	7/10	N/A	N/A	4.6/10
GameSpy	N/A	N/A	N/A	N/A	N/A	78%
IGN	N/A	(US) 8.3/10 (JP) 7.3/10	7/10	3.5/10	7/10	6.4/10
Next Generation	N/A	N/A	N/A	N/A	N/A	3/5
Official U.S. PlayStation Magazine	N/A	N/A	N/A	N/A	N/A	3/5
Pocket Gamer	N/A	N/A	N/A	N/A	2/5	N/A
Maxim	N/A	N/A	N/A	N/A	N/A	3/5
USA Today	N/A	N/A	N/A	N/A	N/A	3/4

The initial console ports of Silent Scope received moderately positive reviews from magazines of the time. The review aggregation website Metacritic places its average score at 63%, indicating "mixed or average reviews." However, this score is based on a low, unrepresentative sample of reviews.

Brett Alan Weiss of AllGame said the arcade version was "a blast to play, though a few more realistic sniper missions would be nice. Graphics are acceptable with decent animation, but the music is indiscernible during the action. The voice acting is unintentionally hilarious." Major Mike of GamePro said of the PlayStation 2 version in its November 2000 issue, "In a field devoid of competition, Silent Scope is a strong first-generation offering and a picture-perfect arcade conversion. While a debatable purchase, Scope easily qualifies as a must-rent title." (Note: GamePro gave the PlayStation 2 version two 4.5/5 scores for graphics and control, and two 4/5 scores for sound and fun factor.) An issue later, Jake The Snake said that the Dreamcast version's several training courses "offer diverse fun, including no-missed-shots allowed, pop-up targets, and moving targets. But you should rent Silent Scope before buying to see if you'll want to keep playing after a few hours." (Note: GamePro gave the Dreamcast version three 4.5/5 scores for graphics, control, and fun factor, and 4/5 for sound.) Edge gave the same Dreamcast version a score of seven out of ten, saying that "it won't take most players long to complete the game, but Silent Scope is all about high scores through high accuracy. That's what Konami needed to port the consoles, and the one shot, one kill moments of euphoria and despar crystallise this as a success." Randy Nelson of NextGen said of the PS2 version, "It's not groundbreaking, but it's a solid shooting game with unique play mechanics." In Japan, Famitsu gave the GBA version a score of 23 out of 40.

Also in Japan, Game Machine listed the arcade version in their September 1, 1999, issue as the second most-successful dedicated arcade game of the month.
