= Silent Scope =

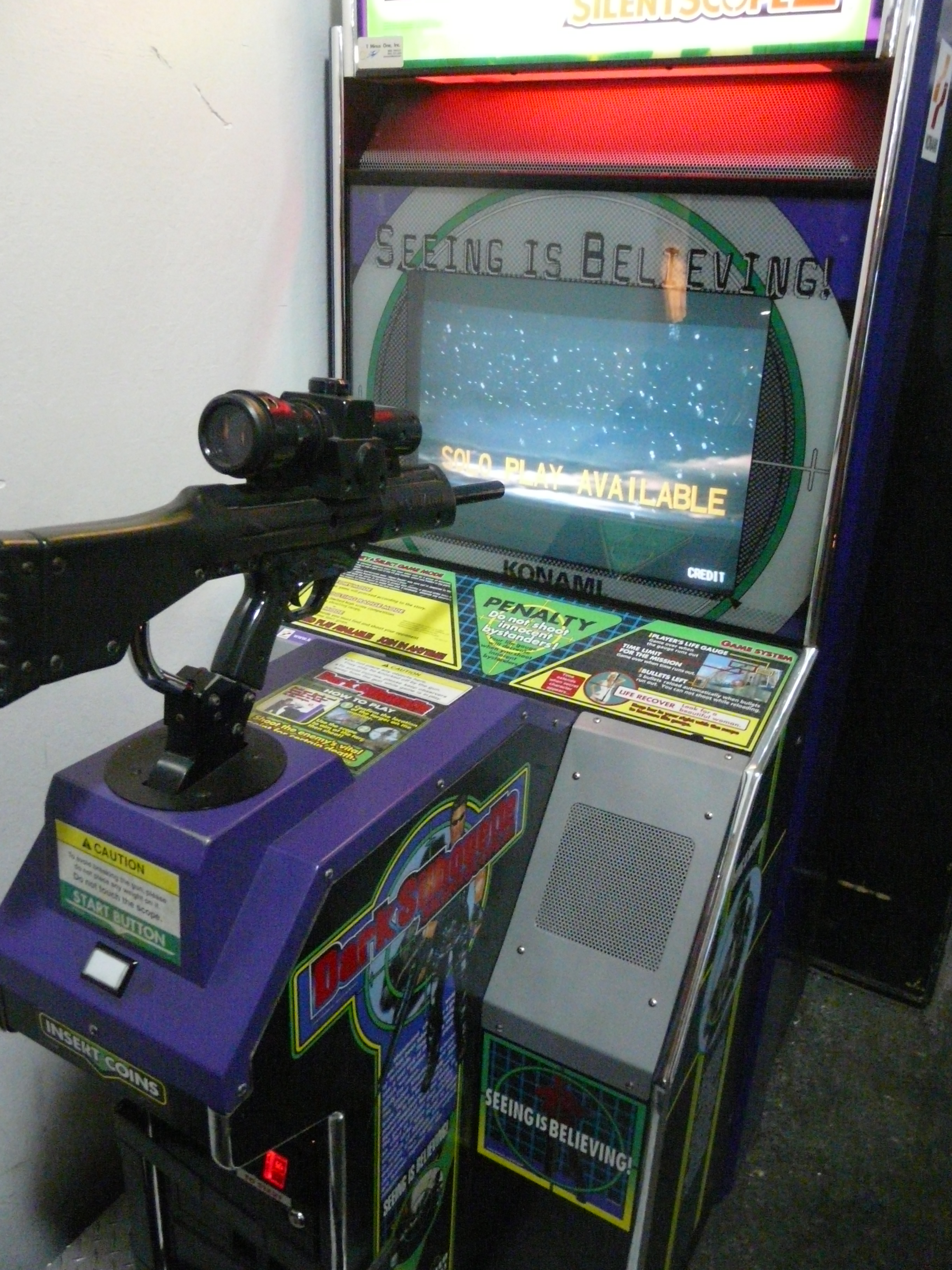
- Silent Scope 2: Dark Silhouette arcade machine
- Genre: Rail shooter
- Developer: Konami
- Publisher: Konami
- Platforms: Arcade, Dreamcast, PlayStation 2, Game Boy Advance, Xbox, iOS
- First release: Silent Scope; 1999
- Latest release: Silent Scope: Bone-Eater; December 30, 2014

Silent Scope is a series of rail shooter video games developed and published by Konami.

== Games ==
Aggregate review scores As of July 19, 2015.
Game	Metacritic
Silent Scope	(GBA) 70 (DC) 63 (PS2) 63
Silent Scope 2	(PS2) 64
Silent Scope 3	(PS2) 61

=== Silent Scope EX (2001) ===
Silent Scope EX was released in the arcades in 2001. It was included with Silent Scope 3 for the PlayStation 2 and Silent Scope Complete for the Xbox.

=== Silent Scope Complete (2004) ===
Silent Scope Complete is a compilation in the Silent Scope video game series released for Xbox. All four games in the compilation play exactly the same, but it also adds in additional levels, story branches and features.

=== Silent Scope: Bone-Eater (2014) ===
Silent Scope: Bone-Eater
- Developer: tri-Ace
- Publisher: Konami
- Designers: Shinya Ukawa; Yuta Okabe; Shintaro Sanoa
- Programmer: Naoto Udagawa
- Artist: Keiichi Nakajima
- Composers: Hideyuki Ono; Tomoaki Hirono; Ayumi Suzuki; Toshihisa Furusawa
- Platform: Arcade
- Release: JP: December 30, 2014
- Genre: Rail shooter
- Mode: Single-player
- Arcade system: Konami PC Based hardware

Silent Scope: Bone-Eater is a rail shooter developed by tri-Ace and published by Konami, released for arcades in 2014. It is the 5th game in the Silent Scope series, not counting Silent Scope Complete.

Bone-Eater plays similarly to previous entries, but features a new anime-like art style.
