= Vectorbeam =

American arcade game manufacturer

- Type: Private
- Industry: Vector games
- Founded: 1977; 49 years ago
- Defunct: 1979
- Successor: Cinematronics
- Headquarters: Union City, California

Vectorbeam was an arcade game manufacturer active in the late 1970s who specialized in vector graphics-based arcade games. It was formed after splitting off from its primary competitor, Cinematronics, and disappeared after re-merging with them soon after.

Vectorbeam was founded by Larry Rosenthal based on his graduate work from the Massachusetts Institute of Technology and which he patented for a custom arcade vector display. The patents were used in Cinematronics' arcade game Space War. The company officially started its own as an independent organization in 1978 in San Francisco, and later moved to Union City, California. Vectorbeam was in direct competition with other arcade game manufacturers. The company ceased operations soon after poor sales of its Barrier arcade game, and sold its assets to Cinematronics. After the company, the rights were leased to Allied Leisure for a multi-year deal for use of patients in 1980.

== List of Vectorbeam games ==
- Space War (arcade game) (1977)
- Barrier (1979)
- Speed Freak (arcade game) (1979)
- Tail Gunner (1979)
- Warrior (arcade game) (1979)
