= Starhawk (1979 video game) =

1979 video game

- North American arcade flyer
- Developer: Cinematronics
- Publishers: NA: Cinematronics; JP: Sega
- Designer: Tim Skelly
- Platforms: Arcade, Vectrex
- Release: Arcade: NA: March 1979; JP: August 1979; Vectrex: October 1982
- Genre: Rail shooter
- Modes: Single-player, multiplayer
- Arcade system: CCPU cpu @ 5 MHz

Starhawk is a 1979 vector arcade game designed and programmed by Tim Skelly and manufactured by Cinematronics. Starhawk is a shoot 'em up unofficially based on the Star Wars trench run, making it one of the first arcade games to blatantly use concepts from the film. The game was unique at the time for its pseudo-3D graphics. It was distributed in Japan by Sega, and was later ported to the Vectrex home system in 1982.

The arcade cabinet had a cinder block placed inside of it, to prevent it from tipping onto the player.

== Plot ==
According to the Vectrex manual, the story involves "protecting your comrades from alien ships trying to infiltrate your culture" and "defending the sovereignty of your planet".

== Gameplay ==
Various ships, reminiscent of TIE fighters, appear on the horizon of the trench and the player has to shoot them before they destroy the player's ship. The player is given initially sixty seconds, but additional twenty seconds is awarded for every 10,000 points scored. The player continues flying down the trench towards a target similar to the Star Wars Death Star target. The game gets progressively more difficult as the player advances. Similar to the flying saucer from Space Invaders, a command ship periodically appears and shoots at the player. If the command ship is not destroyed quickly, the player loses 800 points.

Besides the firing button, there are three buttons that control the speed of the crosshairs.

=== Scoring ===
- Command ship: 800
- Starship: 500
- Rocket: 300
- Missile: 100
- Bomber: 100

== Reception ==
Starhawk was the fifth highest-earning arcade video game of 1979 in the United States, below Space Invaders, Football, Sprint 2 and Head On.

== See also ==
- Star Strike
