= Tail Gunner =

1979 video game

- Arcade flyer
- Developer: Vectorbeam
- Publisher: Cinematronics
- Designers: Dan Sunday; Larry Rosenthal
- Platform: Arcade
- Release: November 1979
- Genre: Shooter
- Mode: Single player
- Arcade system: Vectorbeam hardware

Tail Gunner is a monochrome vector arcade game created by Vectorbeam in 1979. The premise of the game is that the player is the tailgunner of a large space ship. Enemy spacecraft attack the vessel in groups of three, and the player must aim a set of crosshairs and shoot the enemies before they slip past the player's cannons. Because of the game's viewpoint, instead of appearing to fly into the starfield, the stars move toward the left and center of the screen.

In addition to shooting down the enemy ships, the player is also given limited use of a shield that can block ships from passing. The game ends when ten ships slip past the player's cannon. The game was sold as Tail Gunner II in a sit down cabinet and its controls consisted of a single metal joystick with fire button integrated to the tip.

Tail Gunner's sound card was more complicated than any Cinematronics/Vectorbeam game before it. The cabinet uses the monitor's DAC to translate input from the joystick, so other games cannot necessarily be mounted in a Tail Gunner cabinet.
