= Cinematronics =

American video game company

Cinematronics Inc.
- Industry: Video games
- Founded: April 1, 1975
- Defunct: October 21, 1987
- Fate: Dissolved. Tradewest purchased the assets and established The Leland Corporation to house them.
- Successor: The Leland Corporation
- Headquarters: El Cajon, California
- Key people: Jim Pierce (co-founder); Thomas Stroud; Fred Fukumoto
- Products: Space Wars; Star Castle; Dragon's Lair; World Series: The Season
- Subsidiaries: Cinematronics International

Cinematronics Inc. was an American video game publisher that primarily released arcade video games. Cinematronics and Atari, Inc. released vector-display games, which offered a distinctive look and a greater graphic capability (at the time), at the cost of being only black and white (initially). Cinematronics also published Dragon's Lair in 1983, the first major LaserDisc video game. Warner Bros. Games, through their acquisition of Midway Games, owns the rights to Cinematronics' games.

== History ==
Cinematronics Inc. was founded on April 1, 1975, by two players of the San Diego Chargers football team, Dennis Partee and Gary Garrison, as well as Jimmie Dale “Jim” Pierce (1937–2011) in San Diego, California. Garrison initially served as president until Pierce assumed that role. The company first entered the market creating clones of Pong, selling them in the local area. Their first game offered nationally was Flipper Ball (1976) followed by Embargo (1977). The company struggled to stay afloat and in 1977 Garrison sold his share to mortgage broker Ralph Clarke.

=== Vector Games ===
At the end of 1977, Cinematronics released the game Space Wars, developed by independent game developer Larry Rosenthal. The game was a TTL-based recreation of the mainframe game Spacewar! which ran using a custom vector monitor display. Cinematronics, approaching bankruptcy, agreed to manufacture the game in exchange for a five percent royalty on each cabinet to Rosenthal.

Space Wars was first shown at the Amusement and Music Operators of America show in October 1977, but Cinematronics was not ready to produce it. They brought in manufacturing expert Ken Beuck who had worked at Atari Inc. and salesman Bill Cravens to help sell the game. To finance the operation and keep the company from dissolving, San Diego coin-op operator Thomas B. Stroud bought out Partee's share in the company.

When the first units were shipped at the end of 1977, Space Wars was the first commercially available video game using vector graphics, which enabled a higher resolution display than raster graphics of the time. The game became the best-selling coin-operated video game of 1978 and sold around 7,000 units. The success helped save Cinematronics, but Rosenthal along with Bill Cravens were discontented with the company. In April 1978, Rosenthal left the company to found a new operation called Sunrise Research in Northern California. At the behest of his lawyer, he took with him all the documentation necessary to create vector games on his hardware system. Cinematronics retained a licensing agreement to create games using Larry Rosenthal's patents for his vector hardware, but was deprived on the knowledge to do so. Rosenthal's company was eventually renamed Vectorbeam, a marketing name that had been used for the technology at Cinematronics.

Luckily, Cinematronics managed to continue creating games due to two bits of happenstance. Firstly, an engineer named Bob Long had copied the operational codes for Rosenthal's system. Second, Rosenthal had evaluated a new employee named Tim Skelly prior to his departure. Skelly arrived at Cinematronics after Rosenthal had left and developed their first new game after the departure, with the help of technical engineers Dennis Halverson and Rob Patton.

Throughout 1978, Cinematronics experienced a realignment of management. Ralph Clarke departed the company and Tom Stroud's son Tom A Stroud took on the responsibility of salesman. Pierce briefly stepped down as president before reassuming the role. The company did not release any product that year, but debuted Tim Skelly's first game for them, Starhawk (1979), at the Amusement Trade Expo (ATE) in January 1979. Released in March, the game was successful, outcompeting the offering by Vectorbeam, Speed Freak (1979).

Jim Pierce and Tom Stroud kept in communication with Rosenthal to convince them to sell his patents to them. After little more than a year of independence, Vectorbeam was sold to Cinematronics along with the rights to his two patents on vector game technology on June 1, 1979. Vectorbeam became a subsidiary, with Tom A Stroud as the President and Tim Skelly as head of product development. Rosenthal continued developing games including Tail Gunner (1979) and the unreleased Oops! (1979) before departing the company. He later sued Cinematronics for payment of his contractual buyout of his patents.

Vectorbeam served as an alternative factory and label for Cinematronics products through the rest of 1979. Barrier (1979) and Warrior (1979) were released under the Vectorbeam name. In November 1979, Cinematronics sold the Vectorbeam factory and assets to Exidy Inc. who relabeled them as Exidy II. Through this, Exidy gained the rights to develop vector games after their release of Tailgunner as Tailgunner II. A few Vectorbeam staff took positions at Cinematronics in San Diego.

In 1980, Cinematronics began exploiting their rights to the vector game patents more readily. They sued Atari Inc. for their creation of games like Lunar Lander and Asteroids with their own vector system. The case was eventually settled out of court. They began licensing their games to be produced in the cocktail table format by Rock-Ola, who used their license to develop vector games Demon! (1982) and QB-3 (1982). They later gained a landmark judgement in video game copyright when they halted the sale of illegal copies of Star Castle (1980).

Star Castle was co-developed by Skelly and new programmer Scott Boden. It became Cinematronics’ most successful game, selling over 10,000 units and remaining in production over most of 1981. A dispute between Skelly and Cinematronics management led to his departure from the company. He was then hired by Sega/Gremlin, who was also developing vector games, inciting Cinematronics to sue Gremlin and Skelly personally over alleged theft of trade secrets.

The company moved into a newly built 78,000 sq ft facility on 1841 Friendship Drive in El Cajon in June 1981. After releasing the last game developed by Skelly for them, Armor Attack (1981), Cinematronics struggled to find new product to fill their factory. Scott Boden developed Solar Quest (1981) to fill a slot after Star Castle’s production had ceased but failed to find the same success. They attempted to formalize product development, bringing in official managers to set deadlines as well as leading to them developing a tank gunner simulator under a military contract. Their development of a color vector hardware resulted in the release of the unsuccessful Boxing Bugs (1982).

=== Bankruptcy and LaserDisc Games ===
Former Vice President of Finance of the company, Fred Fukumoto, assumed the Presidency of Cinematronics from Jim Pierce in January 1982. Fukumoto's plan for assuring product flow into the company was to license video games from Japanese companies, similar to how Midway had found success with the likes of Space Invaders and Galaxian. They imported the games Naughty Boy (1982) and Jack the Giantkiller (1982) which were both unsuccessful. They canceled many projects including their military contract. In August 1982, they were foreclosed on by Security Pacific Bank and entered Chapter 11 Bankruptcy. Fukumoto left the company and Pierce resumed duties as president.

Still operating in bankruptcy, they maintained a small internal development team – developing the game Cosmic Chasm (1983) – and started a partnership with the company Advanced Microcomputer Systems. After releasing the game Zzyzzyxx (1982), AMS convinced Cinematronics to manufacture their proposed Laserdisc game, Dragon’s Lair (1983), in partnership with Don Bluth Productions. The heads of all three companies formed the entity Starcom to control the rights for the game and any subsequent Laserdisc game releases. Cinematronics organized the production of the game and rode a wave of massive interest to success. Dragon’s Lair kept the company out of bankruptcy and gave them a national profile as leaders in video game technology.

By the time of the follow-up to Dragon's Lair, Space Ace (1984), the partnership between the companies had fallen apart. The collapse of Laserdisc games and the diverging interests of AMS and Don Bluth Productions led them away from developing more games together. Cinematronics location tested Dragon’s Lair II: Time Warp, but did not release it at the time. It would eventually be the final arcade release of The Leland Corporation in 1991.

=== Raster Games and Cinemat System ===
Still in bankruptcy, Cinematronics reformed its internal development structure. They abandoned the development of the vector game technology and started creating their own raster games again for the first time since Embargo. Many of the developers came from Sega/Gremlin, another San Diego company who had recently shed their internal development apparatus. Starting with Freeze (1984), they rebuilt their game-making capacity.

In 1985, Cinematronics introduced the Cinemat system hardware. Part of a trend which included the Nintendo VS System, Capcom's CPS, and later Neo Geo, the Cinemat was a standardized cabinet which allowed operators to change out their current games for a fraction of the price of a full upright cabinet. The software, marquee, and control panel could be changed out of a standard housing. Their first release Cerberus (1985) was followed by more, including World Series: The Season (1985). World Series was a huge technological leap and a significant hit for the company after the Golden Age of Arcade Video Games.

None of their follow-up products from World Series were nearly as successful, including Danger Zone, and the company remained in Chapter 11 bankruptcy – reportedly the longest in the history of California. Jim Pierce felt that he needed to sell the company to keep it operation, so he sold the company on March 30, 1987, to Tradewest, an arcade game licensor and manufacturer operated by Leland Cook, Byron Cook, and John Rowe. Cinematronics as a legal company was taken through bankruptcy, with Tradewest acquiring all of the assets and placing them under the newly formed The Leland Corporation. During the time, Tradewest had published Redline Racer by Cinematronics under the Tradewest name. The legal entity of Cinematronics was dissolved on October 21, 1987.

=== Legacy ===
In bringing vector graphics to the coin-op industry with Space Wars, Cinematronics helped to inaugurate an entirely different type of arcade game. Large video game manufacturers like Atari, Midway, and Sega/Gremlin all created vector games after viewing the success of Cinematronics. Developments in 3D-based vector hardware, as in Atari's Battlezone, also provided the technological basis for some of the earliest games with three-dimensional graphics in the arcade.

Cinematronics’ other major innovation, the Laserdisc game in Dragon’s Lair, has been seen as a landmark moment in the evolution of multimedia. Though the game was criticized for its lack of interactivity, it was the first commercially successful game incorporating traditional audio-visual elements with video game mechanics. Subsequent versions of Dragon’s Lair and Space Ace were ported and converted to various home systems in the 1980s and 1990s, though they did not contain the Cinematronics branding.

Games like Warrior and Rip Off have been praised as innovative takes on arcade gameplay, showing early stages of fighting games and co-operative gameplay, respectively. Star Castle, Armor Attack, and World Series: The Season have been considered among the best arcade games of all time.

Many of Cinematronics’ games received ports to the Vectrex home console under license. One of the original Vectrex titles, Cosmic Chasm (1982), was converted into an arcade game by Cinematronics.

The rights to Cinematronics’ titles were retained by Midway Games after their purchase of Tradewest in 1994. Tim Skelly was asked to sign a legally binding agreement to give the rights to his games developed at Cinematronics to Midway.

== Coin-operated games ==
All games developed by Cinematronics unless otherwise noted.

- Unknown Pong clone (1975)
- Flipper Ball (1976)
- Embargo (May 1977)
- Space Wars (December 1977) Developed by independent designer Larry Rosenthal.
- Starhawk (March 1979)
- Barrier (August 1979) Released under the Vectorbeam label.
- Sundance (October 1979)
- Warrior (October 1979) Released under the Vectorbeam label.
- Tail Gunner (March 1980) Developed by Vectorbeam. Later released by Exidy as Tailgunner II.
- Rip Off (March 1980)
- Star Castle (October 1980)
- Armor Attack (June 1981)
- Solar Quest (October 1981) Developed by independent developer Scott Boden.
- Vanguard (1981) Developed by Tose. Cinematronics published the cocktail cabinet version only (Centuri was the American publisher for upright cabinets).
- Boxing Bugs (May 1982)
- Naughty Boy (June 1982) Developed by Jaleco.
- Jack the Giantkiller (1982) Developed by Hara Industries.
- Zzyzzyxx (December 1982) Developed by Advanced Microcomputer Systems. Later renamed Brix.
- War of the Worlds (February 1983) Also offered in a kit form by Progressive Game Distributors.
- Cosmic Chasm (April 1983)
- Dragon's Lair (July 1983) Developed by Advanced Microcomputer Systems. Licensed from Starcom.
- Space Ace (February 1984) Developed by Advanced Microcomputer Systems. Licensed from Magicom.
- Scion (1984) Developed by Seibu Denshi.
- Freeze (January 1985)
- Cerberus (February 1985)
- Mayhem 2002 (March 1985)
- Power Play (September 1985)
- World Series: The Season (November 1985)
- Alley Master (May 1986)
- Danger Zone (December 1986)
- Redline Racer (December 1986) Also published by Tradewest.

=== Unreleased ===
- Doctor Strange (1980) A vector-based combat game based on the Marvel Comics character of the same name, experimented by Tim Skelly with immediately after Warrior.
- Catch and Throw (1980) A Tim Skelly concept where players were their own shooting projectile. Later worked on at Sega/Gremlin before eventually becoming Reactor (1982) which Skelly independently developed for D. Gottlieb & Co.
- Sentinel (1981) A fixed turret shooting game at advancing targets developed by Scott Boden and Tim Skelly. Evolved into Boxing Bugs.
- Hovercraft (1983) An advanced vector graphics game utilizing polarized 3D imaging. Was location tested and planned to be shown at a trade show, but was shelved in favor of Dragon’s Lair.
- Cutter (c. 1983) A game where players destroyed the web of a spider.
- Express Delivery (1984) A top-down racing and maze game with similar objectives to Paperboy (1985).
- Striker (c. 1986) The four player version of Power Play.

== Bibliography ==
- Tim Skelly's History of Cinematronics and Vectorbeam Retrieved Jul. 8, 2005.
