= List of Vectrex games =

The Vectrex is a vector graphics-based video game console first released in October 1982 and discontinued in early 1984. There were 28 games officially released for the console in the US, including one game built into the system.

== Official releases (1982–1984) ==
Games were released in the US by General Consumers Electronics (GCE), in Europe and Canada by Milton Bradley (MB) and in Japan by Bandai. The console and its games were designed by Western Technologies, part of Smith Engineering, a toy think tank that had previously developed the Microvision. Games were designed by Western Tech employees such as Jeff Corsiglia and Tom Sloper, and then sent to programmers such as Chris King, Bill Hawkins, and Paul Allen Newell.

Title	Designer	Release Date	NA	PAL	JP	Peripheral
3D Crazy Coaster		February 1984	Yes			3D Imager
3D MineStorm (Note: Pack-in title for the 3D Imager headset.)		December 1983	Yes			3D Imager
3D Narrow Escape		February 1984	Yes			3D Imager
AnimAction		February 1984	Yes			Light pen
Armor Attack		October 1982	Yes	Yes	Yes	
Art Master (Note: Pack-in title for the Vectrex Light Pen.)		October 1983	Yes			Light pen
Bedlam	Tom Sloper	July 1983	Yes	Yes		
Berzerk		October 1982	Yes	Yes	Yes	
Blitz! Action Football; Blitz! American Football^{PAL}		October 1982	Yes	Yes		
Clean Sweep		October 1982	Yes	Yes	Yes	
Cosmic Chasm		October 1982	Yes	Yes	Yes	
Fortress of Narzod		July 1983	Yes	Yes		
Heads Up Action Soccer; Soccer / Football^{PAL}		September 1983	Yes	Yes		
Hyperchase: Auto Race		October 1982	Yes	Yes	Yes	
Melody Master		February 1984	Yes			Light pen
Mine Storm (Note: Built into the console.) (Note: A bug-fix version on physical cartridge was released by mail-order only in 1983, titled Mine Storm II.)		October 1982	Yes	Yes	Yes	
Polar Rescue		November 1983	Yes			
Pole Position		November 1983	Yes			
Rip Off		October 1982	Yes	Yes	Yes	
Scramble; Scramble Wars^{JP}	Paul Allen Newell	October 1982	Yes	Yes	Yes	
Solar Quest		October 1982	Yes	Yes	Yes	
Space Wars		October 1982	Yes	Yes	Yes	
Spike (Note: Includes speech synthesis.)	Tom Sloper	October 1983	Yes	Yes		
Spinball; Flipper / Pinball^{PAL}		July 1983	Yes	Yes		
Star Castle		October 1983	Yes			
Star Trek: The Motion Picture; Star Ship^{PAL} Harmagedon^{JP}		October 1982	Yes	Yes	Yes	
Starhawk		October 1982	Yes	Yes	Yes	
Web Wars; Web Warp^{PAL}		September 1983	Yes	Yes		

== Unreleased ==
Unreleased titles by official publishers (General Consumer Electronics (GCE), Milton Bradley (MB) and Bandai.

- Mail Plane (1983) (requires light pen). Prototype game. Introduced GCE/MB marketing literature in USA, Canada, Europe, and Japan. The prototype for the USA area map version appears to be a complete game. Also pictured in MB Finnish language marketing literature for Nordic and European areas indicated MB intended to provide a release with maps specific to Europe. In 2013 Mail Plane was recovered from a prototype cartridge by Chris Romero (a.k.a. "Vectrexer"). The recovered software was released on December 1, 2013 as binary image via made available for public download.
- Test Cart (a.k.a. Test REV. 4) (1982) The Test Cart is a test and diagnostic cartridge for the Vectrex. Various functions are supported based mainly around testing display alignment and intensity, controller functionality, and sound generation. A function to check the installed BIOS checksum is also included. The Test Cart is meant to be used along with the Vectrex Service Manual when repairing and testing the Vectrex game system. Also found later in 2000 was a single Overlay for use with the Test Cart. The Test Cart Overlay was acquired in a private sale from a former GCE employee. The Test Cart Overlay was scanned by Chris Romero (a.k.a. "Vectrexer") and made available in 2001 for public usage, and later on Spike's Big Page.
- Cube Quest (1983)
- Dark Tower
- Pitchers Duel
- Tour de France

== Homebrew titles (1996 to present) ==
- 3D Lord of the Robots
- 3D Sector-X
- 3D Sector-X Hell's Fury
- 3D Scape
- 3D Scape First Edition
- Alien Hunter
- All Good Things
- Asteroid Cowboy
- Beluga Dreams
- Berzerk Debugged
- Big Blue
- BRECHER
- Chimney Hunt
- Circus Vectrex
- City Bomber
- Colorclash
- Colorclash Limited Edition
- Colorclash Slim
- Continuum
- Continuum The Infernal Tetramorph
- Continuum The 7 Pillars of Purgatory
- Continuum Time Warp
- Cronotics
- Crush of Lucifer
- Cube Quest
- Dead of Knight
- Debris Exclusive Edition
- Debris Limited Edition
- Debris Revisited
- Debris Revisited VIP
- Everyday is Halloween
- FRESSSAKK – Highscore Edition
- Frontier
- Galaxy Wars/Space Launcher
- Gravitrex Plus
- Hell Hole
- Hex
- Hexed!
- I, Cyborg
- I, Cyborg: Edition X
- I, Cyborg: OMEGA
- Irrelevant
- Karl Quappe
- KnightEx
- Logo
- Mail Plane
- MENSCHENJAGD
- MineX
- Moon Lander
- N. E. L. S.
- Nebula Commander
- NOX/Death Chase
- Obsolet
- Omega Chase Deluxe
- Omega Chase Deluxe – Collector's Edition
- Patriots
- Patriots Limited Edition
- Performance VX
- Pitcher's Duel
- Player 2
- Protector LE
- Protector/Y*A*S*I
- Quartz's Quest
- Revector
- Release
- Robot Arena
- Rockaroids (limited edition)
- Rockaroids Remix
- Rotor
- Royal 21
- Royal 21 Boston
- Royal 21 Christmas
- Royal 21 Vegas
- RushHour
- Sectis
- Sectis Limited Edition
- Sectis Master Edition
- Shifted
- Snowball
- Space Frenzy
- SpideX
- Spike and the Angry Vortex Bird
- Spike Hoppin'
- Spike's Circus
- Spike's Water Balloons Analog
- Spin-Cart
- Spinnerama
- Spudster's Revenge
- Star Sling LE
- Star Sling Premium Limited Edition
- Star Sling Turbo Edition
- Star Trek Debugged
- STERNENKRIEGER
- Stramash Zone
- Sundance
- Sundance: Dark of the Sun
- Thrust
- Tour de France
- Trapped
- Tsunami/VIX
- Tsunami/VIX – Collectors Edition
- V-Frogger
- V-Hockey
- Vaboom!/Vectrace
- VeCaves/Spike's Spree
- VecMan
- Vecmania

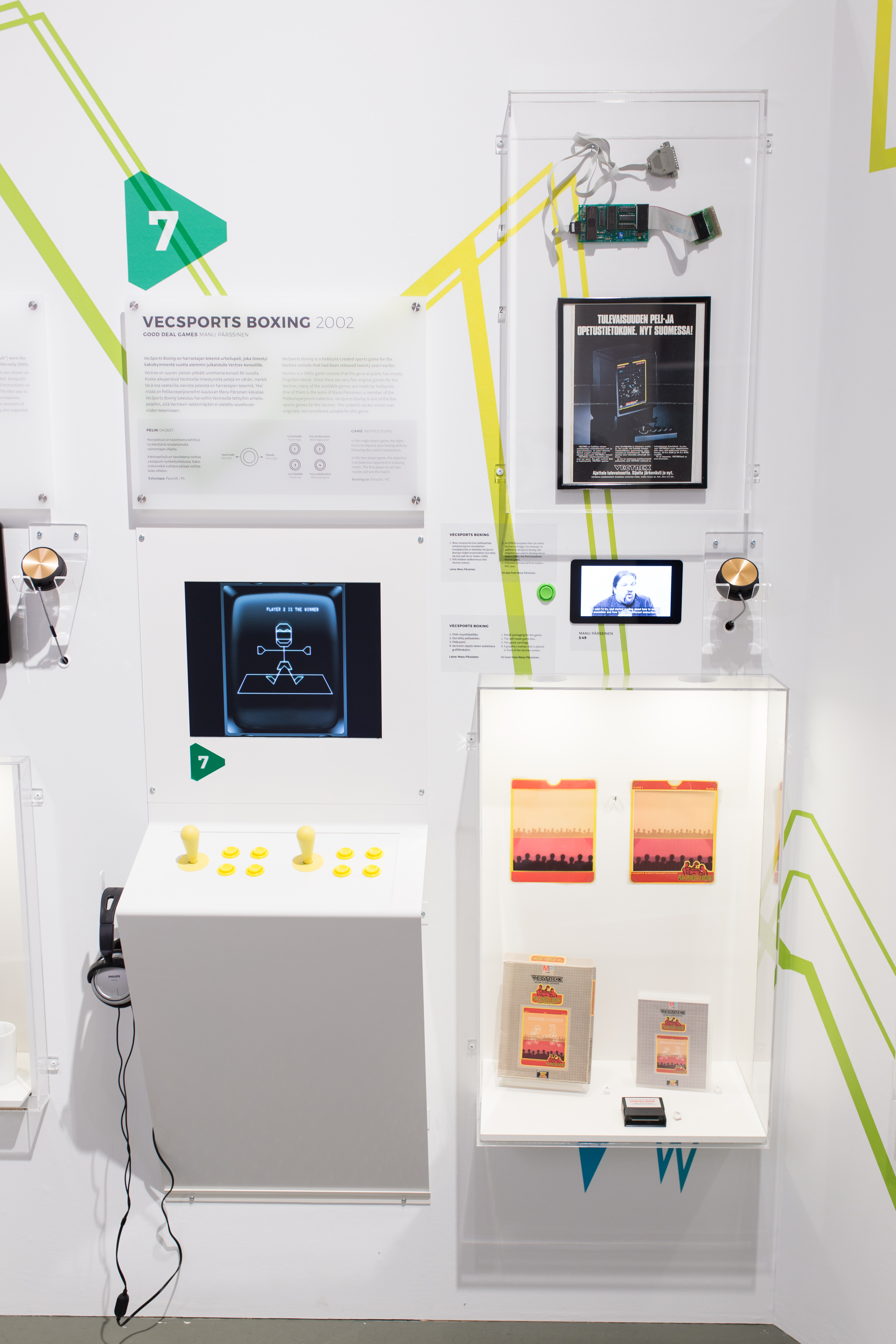
Vec Sports Boxing at the Finnish Museum of Games.

- Vec Sports Boxing
- Vec Sports Boxing Limited Edition
- Veccy Bird
- Vec Wars: Retro Devolved
- Vectoblox
- Vectopia
- Vector 21
- Vector 21: A Fistful of Wildcards!
- Vector 21: OMEGA
- Vector Patrol
- Vector Pilot
- Vector Vaders
- Vectorblade
- Vectrexagon
- Vectrexians
- Vectrexians Deluxe
- Verzerk
- War of the Robots
- War of the Robots: CGE2K3
- War of the Robots: OMEGA
- War of the Worlds
- War of the Worlds Time Rift
- Warrior
- Wireout
- Wireout RE
- Xmas Cart 2014
- Xmas Cart 2014 + 2015 Double Pack
- Xmas Cart 2015
- Zantis
- Zantis: 99 Ways to Die
- Zombie Apocalypse: USA
