= Sweep =

Sweep or swept may refer to:

== Cleaning ==
- Sweep, the action of using a brush to clean
- Chimney sweep, a worker who clears ash and soot from chimneys
- Street sweeper, a person or machine that cleans streets
- Swept quartz, a cleaning of quartz crystal from alkali metal ions

== Arts, entertainment, and media ==
- Sweep (book series), a fictional series by Cate Tiernan
- Sweep (puppet), a character on the British children's television series The Sooty Show
- Sweep, an ability keyword in Magic: The Gathering
- Sweep-picking, a guitar technique
- Sweeps period, a system of calculating viewership for television programming
- Swept (album), a 1991 album by the English singer Julia Fordham
- "Swept", a 1986 song by Spandau Ballet from the album Through the Barricades
- "Sweep", a 2026 song by Quavo from the album Qrömelife

== Detection ==
- Bug sweeping, the common name for electronic counter surveillance
- Minesweeper (ship), a small naval ship designed to engage in minesweeping
- Minesweeping, the practice of removing explosive mines
- Radio-frequency sweep, the action of scanning a radio frequency band for detecting signals transmitted there
- SWEEPS, a 2006 astronomical survey project using the Hubble Space Telescope

== Farming ==
- Sweep (agricultural), a row crop cultivator
- SWEEP (Soil and Water Environmental Enhancement program), a Canadian agricultural program 1986–1988

== People with the name ==
- Shaun Wright-Phillips, a football player nicknamed Sweep

== Sports ==
- Sweep (American football), a running play in American football
  - Packers sweep, a running play popularized by Vince Lombardi and the Green Bay Packers
- Sweep (martial arts), the name used for two categories of martial arts techniques
- Sweep (rowing), a rowing technique
- Sweep shot, a shot played in cricket
- Sweep (sports), or whitewash, winning a series or contest without any losses
- Curling involves sweeping on ice

== Other meanings ==
- Sweep (fish), a number of fish in the suborder Scorpidinae
- Sweep (horse) (1907–1936), champion Thoroughbred race horse
- Sweep (motorcycle), in group motorcycle riding, the last rider in line
- Sweep (software), a digital audio editor
- Sweep, a gradual bend or elbow, in conduit, ductwork, piping, or other tubing
- Well sweep, an irrigation tool
- Sweep account, a kind of bank account
- Sweep line algorithm, a concept in computational geometry
- Sweeps, a regional English term for windmill sails
- Sweepstakes, a sales promotion or lottery
- Swept wing, a layout of the wings on an airplane
- Selective sweep, a loss of genetic variation caused by selection for a beneficial mutation

== See also ==
- Sweeper (disambiguation)
- Sweeps (disambiguation)
- Broom
- Clean sweep (disambiguation)
- Mop
