= Planetoid (disambiguation) =

A planetoid (or minor planet) orbits the Sun but is not a planet or comet.

Planetoid may also refer to:

== Astronomy ==
- A dwarf planet
- An asteroid

== Arts and entertainment ==
- Planetoid (comics), 2012
- Planetoids (video game), 1980
- Planetoid 127, a 1929 novel by Edgar Wallace
