= Missile Command (disambiguation) =

Missile Command is a 1980 shoot 'em up arcade video game.

Missile Command may also refer to:

- Missile Command 3D, 1995 Atari Jaguar game
- Super Asteroids & Missile Command, 1994 Atari Lynx game
- United States Army Aviation and Missile Command
