= Sweeper (disambiguation) =

A sweeper is a small tropical fish of the family Pempheridae.

Sweeper or sweepers may also refer to:

== Literature ==
- "The Sweepers" (poem), by Rudyard Kipling
- The Sweepers (play), by John C. Picardi, about Italian-Americans in WWII Boston

== Entertainment ==
- Sweepers (film), a 1998 American and South African action film
- Lu Tze, a character nicknamed 'Sweeper' in the Discworld series
- Sweeper (Black Cat), a bounty hunter from the manga series Black Cat

== Sports ==
- Sweeper (association football), a defensive position in association football
- Sweeper (baseball), a variation of a slider pitch in baseball
- Sweeper (horse), a Thoroughbred racehorse
- Sweeper, in curling, player who sweeps the ice ahead of the rock

== Other uses ==
- Street sweeper, a person whose job is cleaning the streets or a machine for doing the same
- Carpet sweeper, a mechanical device for cleaning carpets and floors
  - Vacuum cleaner, a similar device, sometimes called a "sweeper"
- Lawn sweeper, a garden tool for lawn care
- Radio sweeper, a short promotional sample used by radio stations
- An alternative term for a sweep account

== See also ==
- Sweep
- Minesweeper
