= Clean sweep =

Clean sweep may refer to:

- Clean sweep (naval), a naval expression meaning a successful mission
- Clean Sweep (film), a 1918 silent film comedy short
- Clean Sweep (1974 video game), an arcade game by Ramtek Corporation.
- Clean Sweep (1982 video game), for the Vectrex
- Clean Sweep (TV series), a 2023 Irish television police drama series
- Operation Clean Sweep, a 2004 coalition counter-insurgency operation in Iraq
- A Clean Sweep, a 1958 British comedy film
- Clean-Sweep, a fictional character in the G.I. Joe universe
- Clean Sweep, a Hardy Boys novel
- Quarterdeck CleanSweep, a software utility for Microsoft Windows used to uninstall applications
- Podium sweep or clean sweep, when one team wins all available medals in a single sporting event
