= Spinball =

Spinball may refer to:

- "Death Game 1999" (later rebranded as "Spinball"), a British comic science fiction/sport story published in Action and Battle Action
- Sonic Spinball, a 1993 pinball video game developed by Sega Technical Institute and published by Sega
- Spinball, an officially released video game for the Vectrex console
- Spinball Whizzer, a spinning roller coaster located in the Adventure Land area of Alton Towers in Staffordshire, England
