= Heads Up Action Soccer =

1983 video game

Heads Up
- Developer(s): General Consumer Electronics
- Publisher(s): Milton Bradley Company
- Platform(s): Vectrex
- Release: September 1983
- Genre(s): Sports (soccer)
- Mode(s): Single-player, multiplayer

Heads Up Action Soccer is a 1983 soccer video game developed by General Consumer Electronics for the Vectrex. It was only the second sports title from GCE, after the football game Blitz!

== Gameplay ==
Heads-Up Action Soccer lets the player challenge a human opponent in head-to-head action or play against the computer, with teams consisting of three soccer players and a goalie controlled by a joystick. Play is on a horizontally scrolling pitch. The same buttons are used to pass or shoot on offense, and to select which player to control on defense. The full playing time is 5 minutes. Despite its name, there are no headers where the players might be able to shoot or pass the ball with their head.

== Reception ==
Noel Steere for Electronic Fun with Computers & Games said "you can't always find a human opponent to play with you. So unless you're a Siamese twin, Heads Up gets thumbs down." The British magazine TV Gamer said it is a "faithful reproduction of soccer which includes a challenging one player version." The 1984 Software Encyclopedia from Electronic Games gave the game an overall rating of 8, praising how "the horizontally scrolling soccer field allows for good movement and control of the stick-figure soccer players". The German magazine TeleMatch rated the game at 3 stars out of 5.

Retrospective reviewers were more negative. The reference guide Classic Home Videogames criticized the game for its simple graphics and slow gameplay, calling the Vectrex "not the best vehicle for sports simulations, as emphasized by this dreadful game." The criticisms of slow player movement is echoed in The Nostalgia Nerd's Retro Tech, who noted "a side-scrolling four-on-four soccer simulation was a bit outside" the strengths of the Vectrex.
