= 3D Crazy Coaster =

1983 video game

- Developer: General Consumer Electronics
- Publisher: Milton Bradley
- Platform: Vectrex
- Release: 1983
- Genre: Vehicle simulation
- Mode: Single-player

3D Crazy Coaster is a 1983 vehicle simulation game developed by General Consumer Electronics and published by Milton Bradley for the Vectrex. The game simulates a ride in a roller coaster, with the player controlling a passenger as they attempt to keep on the ride. It is designed to be used with the Imager glasses peripheral which, using an active shutter 3D system, in addition to the game's vector graphics creates the illusion of depth.

== Gameplay ==
3D Crazy Coaster is a vehicle simulation game which uses vector graphics. The player controls a passenger in the lead car of a roller coaster as it plummets down steep hills and around sharp curves. One goal of the game is to keep the passenger's arms raised throughout the ride without being flung out.
