= Spike (video game) =

1983 video game

- Developer: General Consumer Electronics
- Publisher: General Consumer Electronics
- Platform: Vectrex
- Release: October 1983
- Genre: Platform
- Mode: Single-player

Spike is a 1983 platform game for the Vectrex video game system. The game uses voice synthesis. Spike is included in the iOS Vectrex Regeneration app.

== Gameplay ==
The player must navigate a tiny creature named Spike through chasms and ladders while avoiding enemies and endless pits. The player must collect Molly's bows to unlock doors and reach the final level to save Molly from the boss named Spud and bring her home. The player has four buttons, along with a joystick. The joystick allows the player to move, up, down, left, and right. The 1st button changes the ladder’s position to allow the player to climb. The 2nd Button can make Spike kick to the left. The 3rd button can make Spike kick to the right. And the 4th button can make Spike junp.
