= Sweeps (disambiguation) =

Sweeps is a rating period for Nielsen ratings.

Sweeps may also refer to:

- Sagittarius Window Eclipsing Extrasolar Planet Search, a 2006 astronomical survey
- "Sweeps" (That's So Raven), a 2004 television episode
- Gary "Sweeps" Woods, a fictional character in The Bear TV series
- Sweepstake
- Sweeps, a group of Transformers TV series characters

== See also ==
- Sweep (disambiguation)
