= Asteroids (video game) =

1979 video game

- North American arcade flyer
- Developer: Atari, Inc. (Note: Game Boy version developed by The Code Monkeys.)
- Publishers: Atari, Inc.: Arcade; NA: Atari, Inc.; JP: Taito/Sega 7800 Atari Corporation Game Boy Accolade, Inc. Nintendo
- Designers: Lyle Rains; Ed Logg
- Programmer: Ed Logg
- Series: Asteroids
- Platforms: Arcade, Atari 2600, Atari 8-bit, Atari 7800, Game Boy
- Release: November 1979: Arcade; NA: November 1979; EU: 1979; JP: January 1980 Atari 2600; August 1981 Atari 8-bit; 1981 Atari 7800; May 1986 Game Boy; NA: September 1992; EU: 1992 Game Boy Color; NA: September 21, 1999
- Genre: Multidirectional shooter
- Modes: Single-player, multiplayer

Asteroids is a 1979 multidirectional shooter video game developed and published by Atari, Inc. for arcades. It was released by Taito and Sega in Japan. The player controls a spaceship in an asteroid field which is periodically traversed by flying saucers. The object of the game is to shoot and destroy the asteroids and saucers while avoiding colliding with either or being hit by the saucers' counterfire. The game becomes more difficult as the number of asteroids increases.

Asteroids was conceived and designed by Lyle Rains and Ed Logg, who decided to use hardware developed by Wendi Allen (then known as Howard Delman) that was previously used for Lunar Lander. Asteroids was based on an unfinished game titled Cosmos; its physics model, control scheme, and gameplay elements were derived from Spacewar!, Computer Space, and Space Invaders and refined through trial and error. The game is rendered on a vector display in a two-dimensional view that wraps around both screen axes.

Asteroids was one of the first major hits of the golden age of arcade games; the game sold 47,840 upright cabinets and 8,725 cocktail cabinets, and proved both popular with players and influential with developers. In the 1980s, it was ported to Atari's home systems, with the Atari 2600 version selling over three million copies. The game was widely imitated, and directly influenced Defender, Gravitar, and many other video games.

== Gameplay ==
A ship is surrounded by asteroids and a saucer.

The objective of Asteroids is to destroy asteroids and saucers. The player controls a triangular ship that can rotate left and right, fire shots straight forward, and thrust forward. Once the ship begins moving in a direction, it will continue in that direction for a time without player intervention unless the player applies thrust in a different direction. The ship eventually loses momentum and comes to a stop when not thrusting. The player can also send the ship into hyperspace, causing it to disappear and reappear in a random location on the screen, at the risk of self-destructing or appearing on top of an asteroid.

Each level starts with multiple large asteroids drifting across the screen. Objects wrap around screen edges; an asteroid that drifts off the top edge of the screen reappears at the bottom and continues moving in the same direction. As the player shoots asteroids, they break into smaller asteroids that move faster and are more difficult to hit. Smaller asteroids are also worth more points. Two flying saucers appear periodically on the screen; the "big saucer" shoots randomly and poorly, while the "small saucer" fires frequently at the ship. After reaching a score of 40,000, only the small saucer appears. As the player's score increases, the angle range of the shots from the small saucer diminishes until the saucer fires extremely accurately. Once the screen has been cleared of all asteroids and flying saucers, a new set of large asteroids appears, thus starting the next level. The game gets harder as the number of asteroids increases until after the score reaches a range between 40,000 and 60,000. The player starts with 3–5 lives upon game start and gains an extra life per 10,000 points. Play continues to the last ship lost, which ends the game. The machine "turns over" at 99,990 points, which is the maximum high score that can be achieved.

=== Lurking exploit ===
In the original game design, saucers were supposed to begin shooting as soon as they appeared, but this was changed. Additionally, saucers can only aim at the player's ship on-screen; they are not capable of aiming across a screen boundary. These behaviors allow a "lurking" strategy, in which the player stays near the edge of the screen opposite the saucer. By keeping just one or two rocks in play, a player can shoot across the boundary and destroy saucers to accumulate points indefinitely with little risk of being destroyed. Arcade operators began to complain about losing revenue due to this exploit. In response, Atari issued a patched EPROM and, due to the impact of this exploit, Atari (and other companies) changed their development and testing policies to try to prevent future games from having such exploits.

== Development ==
Asteroids was conceived by Lyle Rains and programmed by Ed Logg with collaborations from other Atari staff. Logg was impressed with the Atari Video Computer System (later called the Atari 2600), and he joined Atari's coin-op division to work on Dirt Bike, which was never released due to an unsuccessful field test. Paul Mancuso joined the development team as Asteroids' technician and engineer Wendi Allen contributed to the hardware. During a meeting in April 1979, Rains discussed Planet Grab, a multiplayer arcade game later renamed to Cosmos. The unfinished game featured a giant, indestructible asteroid. Logg did play Cosmos and remembered shooting the indestructible asteroid to no effect. So Rains asked Logg: "Well, why don't we have a game where you shoot the rocks and blow them up?" In response, Logg described a similar concept where the player selectively shoots at rocks that break into smaller pieces. Thus combining the two-dimensional approach of Space War with Space Invaders' addictive gameplay of "completion" and "eliminate all threats". Both agreed on the concept.

=== Hardware ===
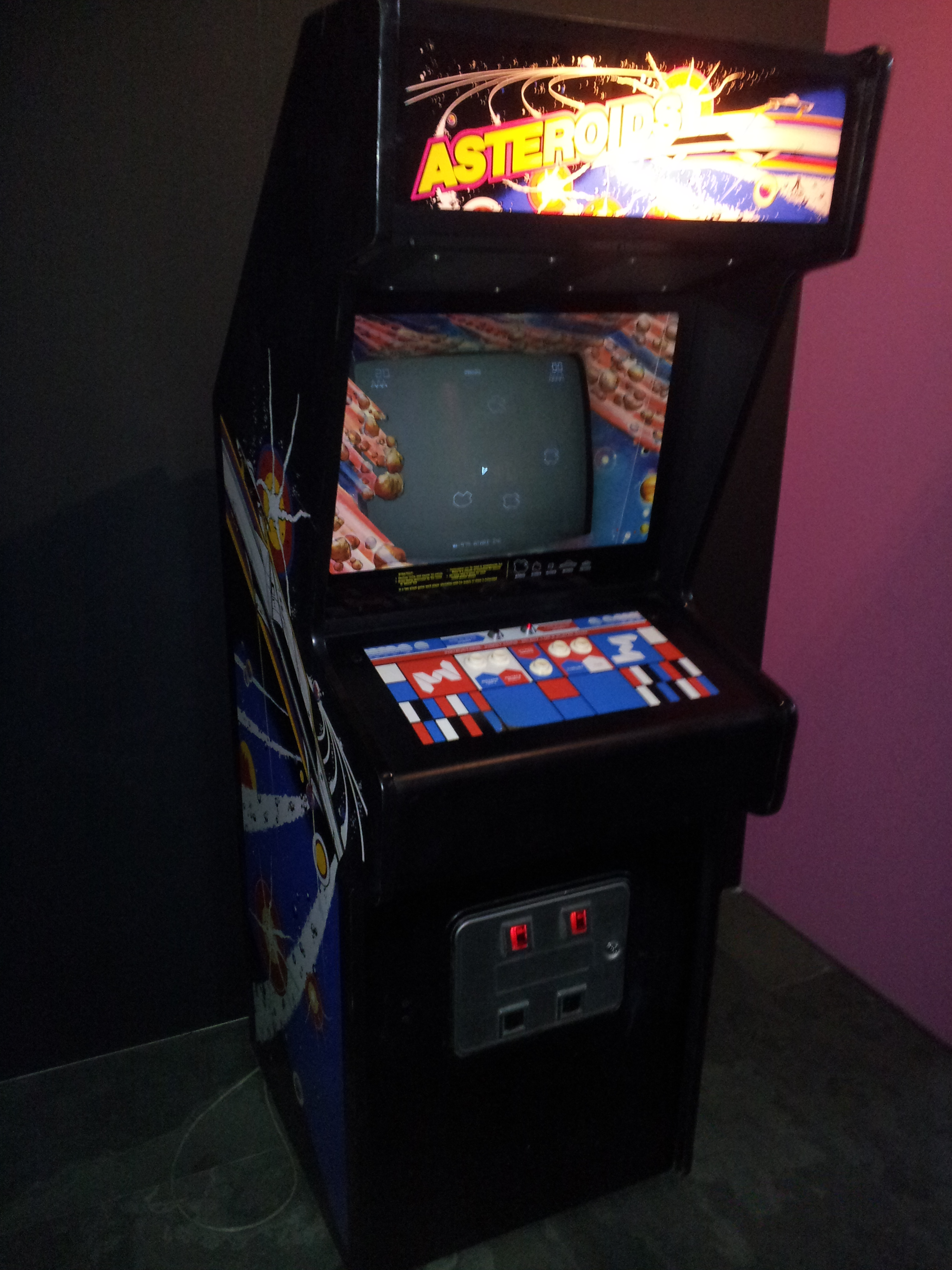
The Asteroids arcade cabinet uses a vector monitor.

Asteroids was implemented on hardware developed by Allen, in which the graphics are composed of lines drawn on a vector monitor. Rains initially wanted the game done in raster graphics, but Logg, experienced in vector graphics, suggested an XY monitor because the high image quality would permit precise aiming. The hardware is chiefly a MOS 6502 executing the game program, and QuadraScan, a high-resolution vector graphics processor developed by Atari and referred to as an "XY display system" and the "Digital Vector Generator (DVG)".

The original design concepts for QuadraScan came out of Cyan Engineering, Atari's off-campus research lab in Grass Valley, California, in 1978. Cyan gave it to Wendi Allen, who finished the design and first used it for Lunar Lander. Logg received Allen's modified board with five buttons, 13 sound effects, and additional RAM, and he used it to develop Asteroids. The size of the board was 4 by 4 inches, and it was "linked up" to a monitor.

=== Implementation ===
Logg modeled the player's ship, the five-button control scheme, and the game physics after Spacewar!, which he had played as a student at the University of California, Berkeley, but made several changes to improve playability. The ship was programmed into the hardware and rendered by the monitor, and it was configured to move with thrust and inertia. The hyperspace button was not placed near Logg's right thumb, which he was dissatisfied with, as he had a problem "tak[ing] his hand off the thrust button". Drawings of asteroids in various shapes were incorporated into the game. Logg copied the idea of a high score table with initials from Exidy's Star Fire.

The two saucers were formulated to be different from each other. A steadily decreasing timer shortens intervals between saucer attacks to keep the player from not shooting asteroids and saucers. A "heartbeat" soundtrack quickens as the game progresses. The game does not have a sound chip. Allen created a hardware circuit for 13 sound effects by hand which was wired onto the board.

A prototype of Asteroids was well received by several Atari staff and engineers, who "wander[ed] between labs, passing comment and stopping to play as they went". Logg was often asked when he would be leaving by employees eager to play the prototype, so he created a second prototype for staff to play. Atari tested the game in arcades in Sacramento, California, and also observed players during focus group sessions at Atari. Players used to Spacewar! struggled to maintain grip on the thrust button and requested a joystick; players accustomed to Space Invaders noted they get no break in the game. Logg and other engineers observed proceedings and documented comments in four pages.

=== Quirks ===
Asteroids slows down as the player gains 50–100 lives, because there is no limit to the number of lives displayed. The game's code continues trying to draw them even if they fall outside the boundaries of the screen. After more than 250 lives are collected, the game slows down enough that the watchdog timer thinks it has crashed and reboots the hardware.

There is a limit of 26 asteroids. If there are already that many, shooting a large asteroid turns it into a single medium one, rather than two as per normal. Similarly, a medium asteroid turns into a single small one instead of splitting.

== Ports ==
Asteroids was released for the Atari VCS (later renamed Atari 2600) and Atari 8-bit computers in 1981. Programmers Brad Stewart and Bob Smith were unable to fit the Atari VCS port into a 4 KB cartridge. It became the first game for the console to use bank switching, a technique that increases ROM size from 4 KB to 8 KB. A port for the Atari 5200, identical to the Atari 8-bit version, was in development in 1982, but was not published.

An Atari 7800 version was published in 1986 with the official launch of the console, with cooperative play. A Game Boy port developed by The Code Monkeys was released in September 1992 by Accolade, and in 1995 by Nintendo as part of their Arcade Classic series alongside Missile Command.

== Reception ==
Asteroids was immediately successful upon release. It displaced Space Invaders by popularity in the United States and became Atari's best-selling arcade game of all time, with over 70,000 units sold. Atari earned an estimated $150 million in sales from the game, and arcade operators earned a further $500 million from coin drops. Atari had been in the process of manufacturing another vector game, Lunar Lander, but demand for Asteroids was so high "that several hundred Asteroids games were shipped in Lunar Lander cabinets". Asteroids was so popular that some video arcade operators had to install large boxes to hold the number of coins spent by players, and Atari assembly line workers that ignored other games they built played finished Asteroids machines awaiting shipping. It replaced Space Invaders at the top of the US RePlay amusement arcade charts in April 1980, though Space Invaders remained the top game at street locations. Asteroids went on to become the highest-grossing arcade video game of 1980 in the United States, dethroning Space Invaders. It shipped 70,000 arcade units worldwide in 1980, including over 60,000 sold in the United States that year, and grossed about $700 million worldwide ($3 billion adjusted for inflation) by 1980. The game remained at the top of the US RePlay charts through March 1981. The game did not perform as well overseas in Europe and Asia. It sold 30,000 arcade units overseas, for a total of 100,000 arcade units sold worldwide. Atari manufactured 76,312 units from its US and Ireland plants, including 21,394 Asteroids Deluxe units. It was a commercial failure in Japan when it released there in 1980, partly due to its complex controls and partly due to the Japanese market beginning to lose interest in space shoot 'em ups at the time.

Asteroids received positive reviews from critics, and has been regarded as Logg's magnum opus. Richard A. Edwards reviewed the 1981 Asteroids home cartridge in The Space Gamer No. 46. Edwards commented that "this home cartridge is a virtual duplicate of the ever-popular Atari arcade game. [...] If blasting asteroids is the thing you want to do then this is the game, but at this price I can't wholeheartedly recommend it". Video Games Player magazine reviewed the Atari VCS version, rating the graphics and sound a B, while giving the game an overall B+ rating. Electronic Fun with Computers & Games magazine gave the Atari VCS version an A rating.

William Cassidy, writing for GameSpy's "Classic Gaming", noticed its innovations, including being one of the first video games to track initials and allow players to enter their initials for appearing in the top 10 high scores, and commented that "the vector graphics fit the futuristic outer space theme very well". In 1995, Flux magazine ranked the arcade version 11th on their "Top 100 Video Games". In 1996, Next Generation listed it as number 39 on their "Top 100 Games of All Time", particularly lauding the control dynamics which require "the constant juggling of speed, positioning, and direction". In 1999, Next Generation listed Asteroids as number 29 on their "Top 50 Games of All Time", commenting that "Asteroids was a classic the day it was released, and it has never lost any of its appeal". Asteroids was ranked fourth on Retro Gamer's list of "Top 25 Arcade Games"; the Retro Gamer staff cited its simplicity and the lack of a proper ending as allowances of revisiting the game. In 2012, Asteroids was listed on Time's All-Time 100 greatest video games list. Entertainment Weekly named Asteroids one of the top ten games for the Atari 2600 in 2013. It was added to the Museum of Modern Art's collection of video games. In 2021, The Guardian listed Asteroids as the second greatest video game of the 1970s, just below Galaxian (1979). By contrast, in March 1983 the Atari 8-bit port of Asteroids won sixth place in Softline's Dog of the Year awards "for badness in computer games", Atari division, based on reader submissions.

Usage of the names of Saturday Night Live characters "Mr. Bill" and "Sluggo" to refer to the saucers in an Esquire article about the game led to Logg receiving a cease and desist letter from a lawyer with the "Mr. Bill Trademark".

== Legacy ==
=== Arcade sequels ===
Released in 1981, Asteroids Deluxe was the first sequel to Asteroids. Dave Shepperd edited the code and made enhancements to the game without Logg's involvement. The onscreen objects are tinted blue, and hyperspace is replaced by a shield that depletes when used. The asteroids rotate, and new "killer satellite" enemies break into smaller ships that home in on the player's position. The arcade machine's monitor displays vector graphics overlaying a holographic backdrop. The game is more difficult than the original and enables saucers to shoot across the screen boundary, eliminating the lurking strategy for high scores in the original.

Space Duel, released in arcades in 1982, replaces the rocks with colorful geometric shapes and adds cooperative two-player gameplay.

1988's Blasteroids includes power-ups, ship morphing, branching levels, bosses, and the ability to dock ships in multiplayer for added firepower. Blasteroids uses raster graphics instead of vectors.

=== Asteroids (1998) ===
Activision published an enhanced version of Asteroids for the PlayStation (1998), Microsoft Windows (1998), Game Boy Color (1999), and Classic Mac OS (2000) developed by Syrox Developments. This version radically altered the graphics, replacing the vector-based visuals with 3D rendered models. Five new zones were added with 15 levels each. In addition, new obstacles were added including regenerating crystal asteroids, indestructible asteroids, mild black holes that pull the ship inward, and stars that occasionally emit bursts of hazardous gas. The player chooses between one of three ships and can collect a number of new powerups.

Many critics felt that the new gameplay additions and graphics added little to the existing gameplay. PC Gamer's Joel Durham Jr. felt it was "little more than a cosmetic update of the arcade game." IGN's Doug Peppery found the new levels to be "fun and engaging." Critics agreed that the gameplay was true to the original. Games Domain said "If you want more of the same old Asteroids, the new game will not disappoint you. [...] However, if you want something different or have greater expectations, look elsewhere."

=== Other re-releases ===
The game is half of the Atari Lynx pairing Super Asteroids & Missile Command and included in the 1993 Microsoft Arcade compilation. The Atari Flashback series of dedicated video game consoles have included both the 2600 and the arcade versions of Asteroids.

Asteroids Hyper 64 made the ship and asteroids 3D, and added new weapons and a multiplayer mode. It was developed by Syrox Developments and published by Crave Entertainment for the Nintendo 64.

A technical demo of Asteroids was developed by iThink for the Atari Jaguar but was never released. Unofficially referred to as Asteroids 2000, it was demonstrated at E-JagFest 2000. An updated version of the game was announced in 2018 for the Intellivision Amico.

Different versions of Asteroids were included in several Atari games compilations, such as Atari Anniversary Edition (2001) for the Dreamcast, PlayStation, and Microsoft Windows, Atari Anthology (2003) for both Xbox and PlayStation 2, Atari Greatest Hits Volume 1 (2010) for the Nintendo DS, Atari Collection 1 and 2 (2020) for the Evercade, and Atari 50 (2022) for the Atari VCS, Nintendo Switch, PlayStation 4, PlayStation 5, Windows, Xbox One, and Xbox Series X/S.

The Xbox Live Arcade port of Asteroids, released in November 2007, has revamped HD graphics along with an added intense "throttle monkey" mode. The arcade and 2600 versions were made available through Microsoft's Game Room service in 2010. Glu Mobile released an enhanced mobile phone port.

In 2005 Asteroids was released for the Game Boy Advance with Pong and Yars' Revenge also being included on the same package.

A remake, Asteroids: Recharged, was released in December 2021 for the Nintendo Switch, PlayStation 4, PlayStation 5, Windows, Xbox One, and Xbox Series X/S, developed by Adamvision Studios and SneakyBox and published by Atari.

In November 2024, Alan-1 Inc. released an official coin-op arcade version of Asteroids Recharged. The game won the first place in Best New Product of the category Games and Devices of the IAAPA 2024 Brass Ring Awards.

=== Clones ===
Quality Software's Asteroids in Space (1980) was one of the best selling games for the Apple II and voted one of the most popular software titles of 1978–80 by Softalk magazine. In December 1981, Byte reviewed eight Asteroids clones for home computers. Three clones for the Apple II were reviewed together in the 1982 Creative Computing Software Buyers Guide: The Asteroid Field, Asteron, and Apple-Oids. In the last of these, the asteroids are in the shape of apples. Two independent clones, Asteroid for the Apple II and Fasteroids for TRS-80, were renamed to Planetoids and sold by Adventure International. Others clones include Acornsoft's Meteors, Moons of Jupiter for the VIC-20, MineStorm for the Vectrex, and Quicksilva's Meteor Storm for the ZX Spectrum which uses speech synthesis. A poorly implemented Asteroids clone for the VIC-20, published by Bug-Byte, motivated Jeff Minter to found Llamasoft.

The Intellivision game Meteor! was cancelled to avoid a lawsuit for being too similar to Asteroids and was reworked as Astrosmash. The game borrows elements from Asteroids and Space Invaders.

=== Upcoming film adaptation ===
In July 2009, Universal Pictures offered Roland Emmerich the option to direct the film adaptation of Asteroids, with Matt Lopez writing the script and Lorenzo di Bonaventura producing the film adaptation. Lopez and di Bonaventura were still attached to write and produce the film adaptation, respectively, but Emmerich passed on directing, while Evan Spiliotopoulos and F. Scott Frazier were hired to rewrite the screenplay. On July 23, 2026 Atari signed a major development deal with Universal Pictures and Entertainment 360 to adapt 10 classic video games into feature films, including Asteroids.

=== In other media ===
The game has made cameo appearances in a number of films and music videos. An Asteroids machine appears in the music video for 38 Special's song Caught Up in You, and one is also briefly seen in the movie Pee-Wee's Big Adventure. A licensed version of the original cabinet is used in arcades in the video game Planet Coaster 2.

== World records ==
On February 6, 1982, Leo Daniels of Carolina Beach, North Carolina, set a world record score of 40,101,910 points. On November 13 of the same year, 15-year-old Scott Safran of Cherry Hill, New Jersey, set a new record at 41,336,440 points. In 1998, to congratulate Safran on his accomplishment, the Twin Galaxies Intergalactic Scoreboard searched for him for four years until 2002, when it was discovered that he had died in an accident in 1989. In a ceremony in Philadelphia on April 27, 2002, Walter Day of Twin Galaxies presented an award to the surviving members of Safran's family, commemorating his achievement. On April 5, 2010, John McAllister broke Safran's record with a high score of 41,838,740 in a 58-hour Internet livestream.
