= John C. Picardi =

American dramatist

John C. Picardi is the author of the plays The Sweepers, and Seven Rabbits on a Pole. His plays have been published by Samuel French and produced off-Broadway at Urban Stages (in Manhattan) and elsewhere across the United States. Sweepers received positive reviews in the Los Angeles Times. Lawrence Van Gelder of the New York Times favorably reviewed both plays. Van Gelder said about Sweepers that "Mr. Picardi's writing renders his characters timeless" and opened his review of Seven Rabbits on a Pole with "An epic is in the making".
