= Super Asteroids & Missile Command =

1995 video game

- Cover art
- Developer: Atari Corporation
- Publisher: Atari Corporation
- Programmer: Steve Marschner
- Series: Asteroids; Missile Command
- Platform: Atari Lynx
- Release: NA: 1995
- Genre: Shoot 'em up
- Mode: Single-player

Super Asteroids & Missile Command is a 1995 video game compilation developed and published by Atari Corporation for the Atari Lynx. It combines the classic video games Asteroids and Missile Command into a single game cartridge. It was the final game released by Atari for the Lynx handheld.

== Summary ==
The graphics and sound are enhanced from their original incarnations. This game was only released in North America and Europe.

Super Asteroids pits the player against a never ending supply of extraterrestrial debris and enemy UFOs trained to kill any human spacecraft. He must destroy everything while snatching power-ups. Super Missile Command has the player defend various of his space colonies from incoming missiles, satellites, and enemy fighters. Intermissions allow players to buy better missiles and defense system to bolster up his defense of his space colonies.

== Reception ==
Reception

Review score
Publication	Score
Digital Press	7/10
