= Clean Sweep (1982 video game) =

- European box art
- Developer: Richard Moszkowski
- Publisher: MB Video Electronics
- Platform: Vectrex
- Release: NA: October 1982; EU: 1983
- Genre: Maze

Clean Sweep is a 1982 maze game released for the Vectrex and written by Richard Moszkowski.

== Gameplay ==
Clean Sweep is a maze game in which the bank president has to recover stolen money using a vacuum cleaner and return it to the deposit box while avoiding the thieves. Some portions of the game feature a dark maze where the player can see only the loot.

== Reception ==
TV Gamer noted that this was the first of its kind for either arcade or home consoles, and "A fairly successful attempt at a maze game using Vector graphics".

== Reviews ==
- TeleMatch (German)
- Joystick (Swedish)
