= Planetoids (video game) =

1980 video game

- Publisher: Adventure International
- Programmers: Marc Goodman (Apple II); Greg Hassett (TRS-80)
- Platforms: Apple II, TRS-80
- Release: Apple II: WW: 1980; TRS-80: WW: 1981
- Genre: Multidirectional shooter
- Modes: Single-player, multiplayer

Planetoids is a clone of Atari, Inc.'s 1979 Asteroids arcade video game published by Adventure International for the Apple II in 1980 and TRS-80 in 1981. Each was originally an independently sold game, neither of which was titled Planetoids. The Apple II version, programmed by Marc Goodman, was published as Asteroid. The TRS-80 game was written by Greg Hassett as Fasteroids by Adventure Works. Fasteroids was still sold by Adventure Works at the same time Planetoids was available through Adventure International. The TRS-80 version includes features not present on the Apple II or arcade original.

== Gameplay ==
Planetoids is a version of the 1979 arcade game, Asteroids. The TRS-80 adaptation includes three additional modes: high-speed asteroids, very slow moving asteroids, and a dogfight with only enemy ships.

== Reception ==
Ian Chadwick reviewed Planetoids in Ares magazine #11 and commented that "it's enjoyable and [...] well done. It's a must for fans of the arcade game". In 80-U.S. magazine, Bob Liddil called Fasteroids, "Asteroids with GUSTO" and called out the ability to save high scores to tape and the pause feature as positives.
