= The Sweepers (play) =

Play about Italian-Americans in WWII Boston

The Sweepers is a two-act play written by John C. Picardi. A dramatic comedy set in the Italian-American neighborhood of North End, Boston, the play centers around the lives of three women towards the end of World War II.

The Sweepers premiered Off-Broadway at the Urban Stages theater in New York in 2002, where it was directed by Frances Hill. In his review of the original production, Lawrence Van Gelder of The New York Times complimented the cast, production values and Picardi's writing, which Van Gelder felt "renders his characters timeless." Originally the first in a planned 10-play series depicting the experiences of Italian Americans, the play has had regional productions across the United States, including a West Coast premiere at the International City Theater in 2008.
