= Soil and Water Environmental Enhancement Program =

The Soil and Water Environmental Enhancement Program (SWEEP), was a Canadian agricultural program administered by Agriculture and Agri-Food Canada, and carried out by the province of Ontario. Designed to examine the effects of tillage on many types of soil, the program ran from 1986 through 1988. The impetus for the program was the Canada-U.S. Great Lakes Water Quality Agreement, calling for a reduction in phosphorus pollution in the Lake Erie basin of 2000 tonnes per year. Canada agreed to reduce phosphorus run-off by 300 tonnes per year—200 from agricultural cropland sources and 100 from industrial and municipal sources by 1990.
