= Vectrex =

1982 vector display game console

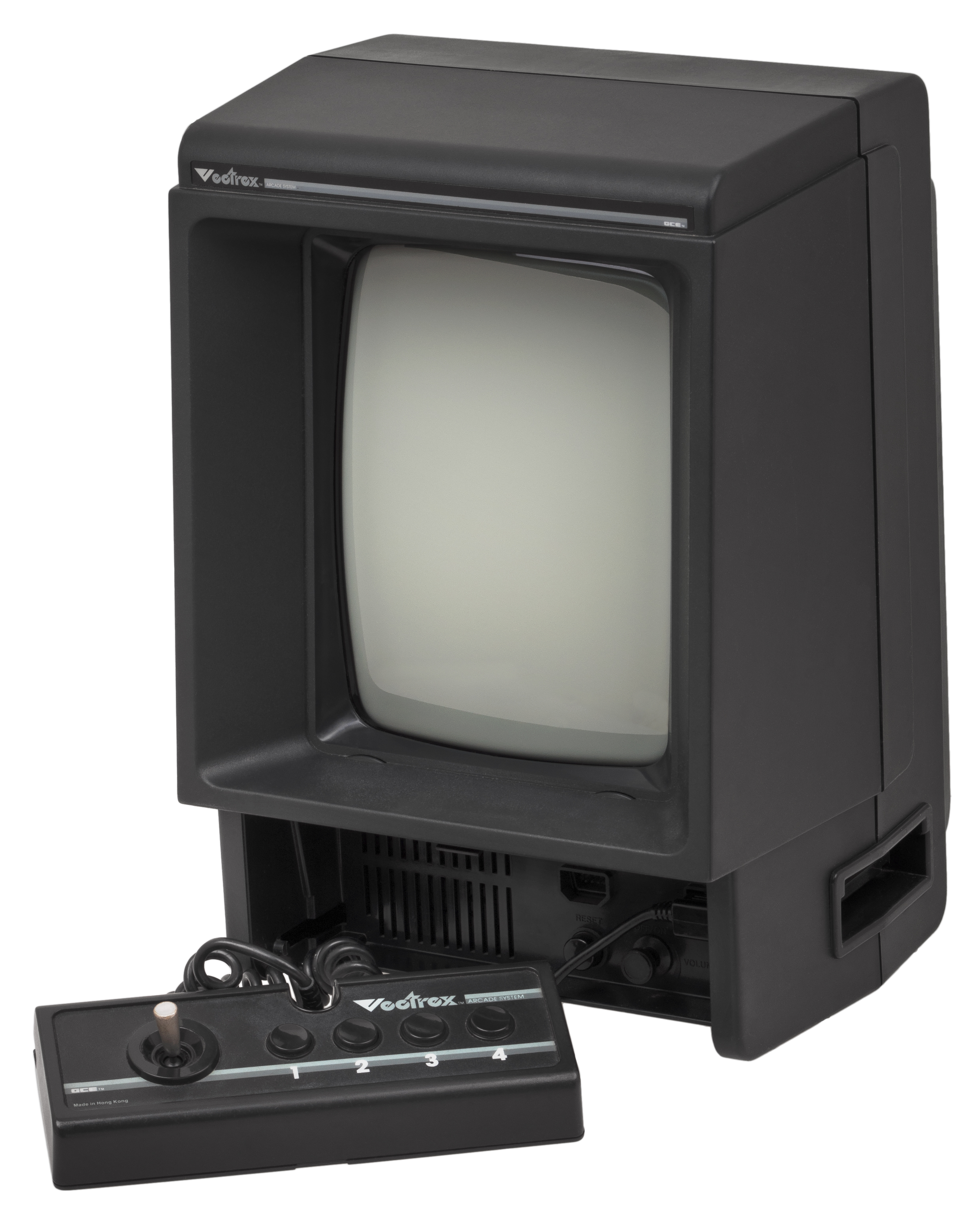
- A Vectrex and its controller
- Developer: Smith Engineering
- Manufacturer: Milton Bradley Company; General Consumer Electronics
- Type: Home video game console
- Generation: Second generation
- Released: NA: October 1982; EU: 1983; JP: 1983
- Introductory price: US$199 (equivalent to $660 in 2025)
- Discontinued: January 27, 1984
- Media: ROM cartridge
- CPU: Motorola MC68A09 @ 1.5 MHz
- Memory: 1 KB
- Display: 9-inch cathode-ray tube (CRT)
- Graphics: Vector-based
- Sound: AY-3-8912
- Controller input: 2 controller ports
- Weight: 6.8kg (15lbs)

The Vectrex is a vector display–based home video game console, the only one ever designed and released for the home market, that was developed by Smith Engineering and manufactured and sold by General Consumer Electronics. It was first released for the North American market in October 1982 and then Europe and Japan in 1983. Originally produced by American company General Consumer Electronics, it was later licensed to Milton Bradley after they acquired the company.

The Vectrex, in contrast to other video game systems at the time, did not need to be hooked up to a television set; it had an integrated (vertically oriented) monochrome CRT monitor. A detachable wired control pad could be folded into the lower base of the console. Games came with translucent color overlays to place over the screen. Optional peripherals include a pair of 3D goggles known as the "3D Imager" and a light pen for drawing directly on the screen. The Asteroids-inspired Mine Storm was built into the system.

The console was conceived by John Ross, of Smith Engineering, in late 1980 as a handheld called the "Mini Arcade". As development progressed, it morphed into a tabletop system that was manufactured by General Consumer Electronics, which was acquired by Milton Bradley just before launch. Sales of the Vectrex stalled amid the video game crash of 1983, and the system was discontinued in January 1984. Milton Bradley reported that they had lost $31.6 million on the product. A few months later, Milton Bradley was acquired by Hasbro and all support ceased.

Despite its commercial failure, the Vectrex was praised for its software library, unique graphical capabilities, and built-in monitor. Several publications lauded it as one of the best consoles available at the time. The Vectrex was the first console to have a 3D-based peripheral. A color version of the Vectrex and later a handheld were both conceived in the late 1980s, but never released.

Bandai released the system in Japan under the name Kōsokusen (光速船), meaning Lightspeed Ship.

== History ==
The Vectrex was conceived by John Ross of Smith Engineering. Ross, Mike Purvis, Tom Sloper, and Steve Marking had gone to Electro-Mavin, a surplus warehouse in Los Angeles. They found a 1-inch cathode-ray tube (CRT) and wondered if a small electronic game could be made of it. A demonstration of a vector-drawing cathode-ray tube display was made by connecting the deflection yoke in a standard television to the channels of a stereo amplifier fed with music program material. An auxiliary yoke was used to keep the raster television's horizontal fly-back high-voltage system running. The demo led to a system originally conceived as a handheld called the Mini Arcade but, as Smith Engineering shopped the idea around to developers, it evolved into a tabletop with nine-inch screen.

The system was licensed to General Consumer Electronics (GCE) in 1981. GCE had previously released handheld LCD games, including a wrist watch called the Game Time that could also play games. After a brief hardware and software development period, the Vectrex was unveiled on 7 June 1982 at the Summer Consumer Electronics Show in Chicago. Following the show, GCE got cold feet about entering the video game market alone. According to GCE's chairman Ed Krakauer, the company saw some early warning signs of the video game crash of 1983 and wanted a larger partner to help launch the system. GCE was acquired as a fully owned subsidiary of the toy company Milton Bradley in September, just before the system first hit shelves. It was publicly released in seven select introductory markets in October at a retail price of US$199 before being distributed nationally in the first quarter of 1983.

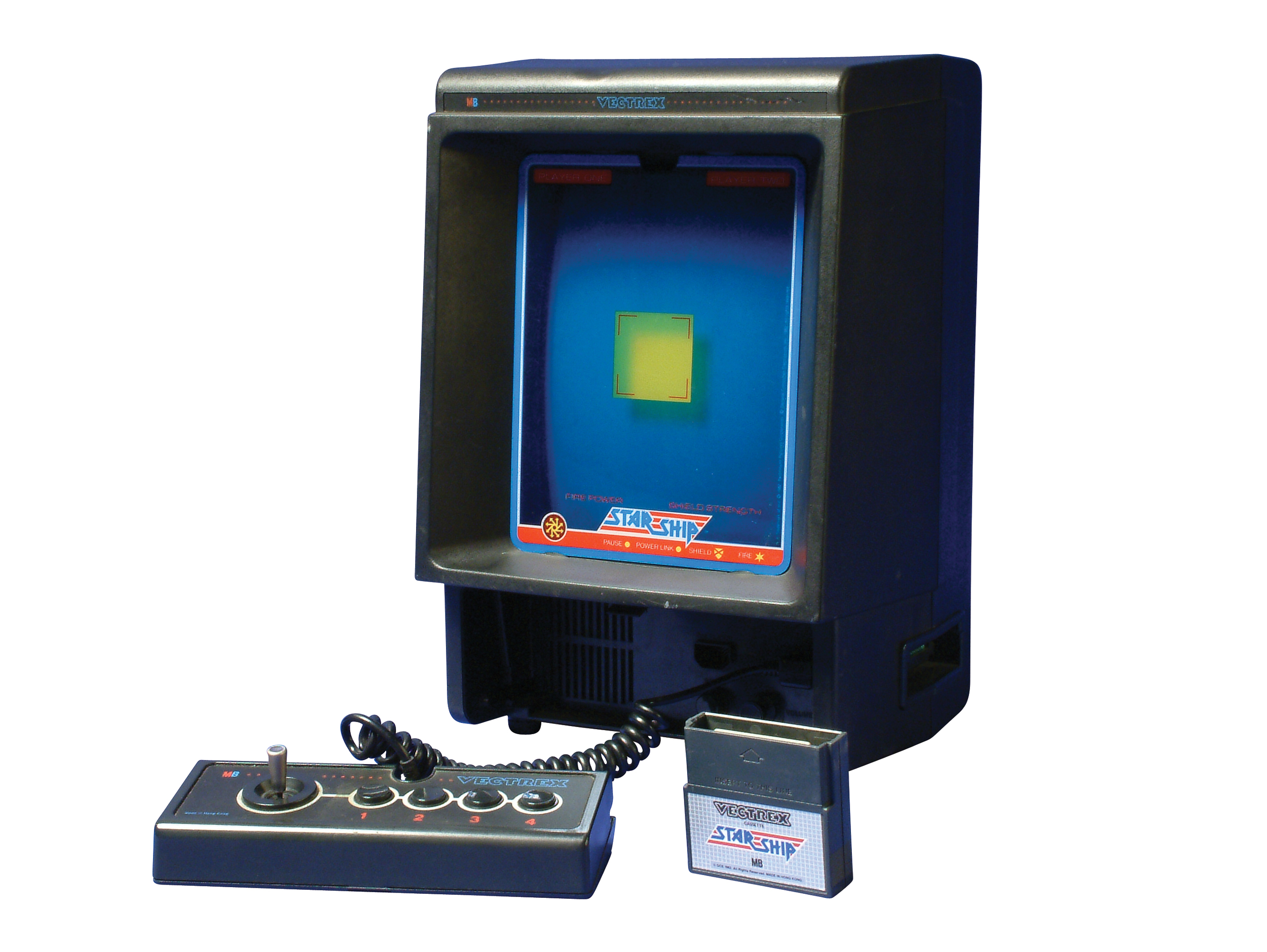
European release Vectrex with Star Ship game and overlay

Milton Bradley's greater resources allowed the Vectrex to be released in parts of Europe by mid-1983 and, through a co-branding agreement with Bandai, in Japan as well. However, the North American video game crash of 1983 turned Milton Bradley's support of the Vectrex into a costly mistake, even despite reducing its price by 25% and then later 50% in desperation to sell units. On January 27, 1984, Milton Bradley announced the discontinuation of the console following millions in losses. They were reported to have lost $31.6 million on the Vectrex. The company's entire inventory of consoles and accessories was sold off to mass-market discount houses, where they were liquidated at a fraction of the console's introductory price. By May 1984, Milton Bradley merged with Hasbro and after-market support ended. Following the discontinuation, Milton Bradley released all rights back to Smith Engineering.

Prior to the Vectrex's discontinuation, a successor console with a color screen had been planned. In 1988, Smith Engineering made plans to revive the Vectrex as a handheld, but the imminent arrival of Nintendo's Game Boy and Milton Bradley's concerns that the $100+ price point would make the unit unsellable, put an end to those plans. In the mid-1990s, Jay Smith, then head of Smith Engineering, allowed new hardware and software development on a fee- and royalty-free basis. Smith has also allowed duplication of the original Vectrex software on a not-for-profit basis to allow Vectrex owners to obtain the original titles at low cost or for free.

== Design and technical specifications ==
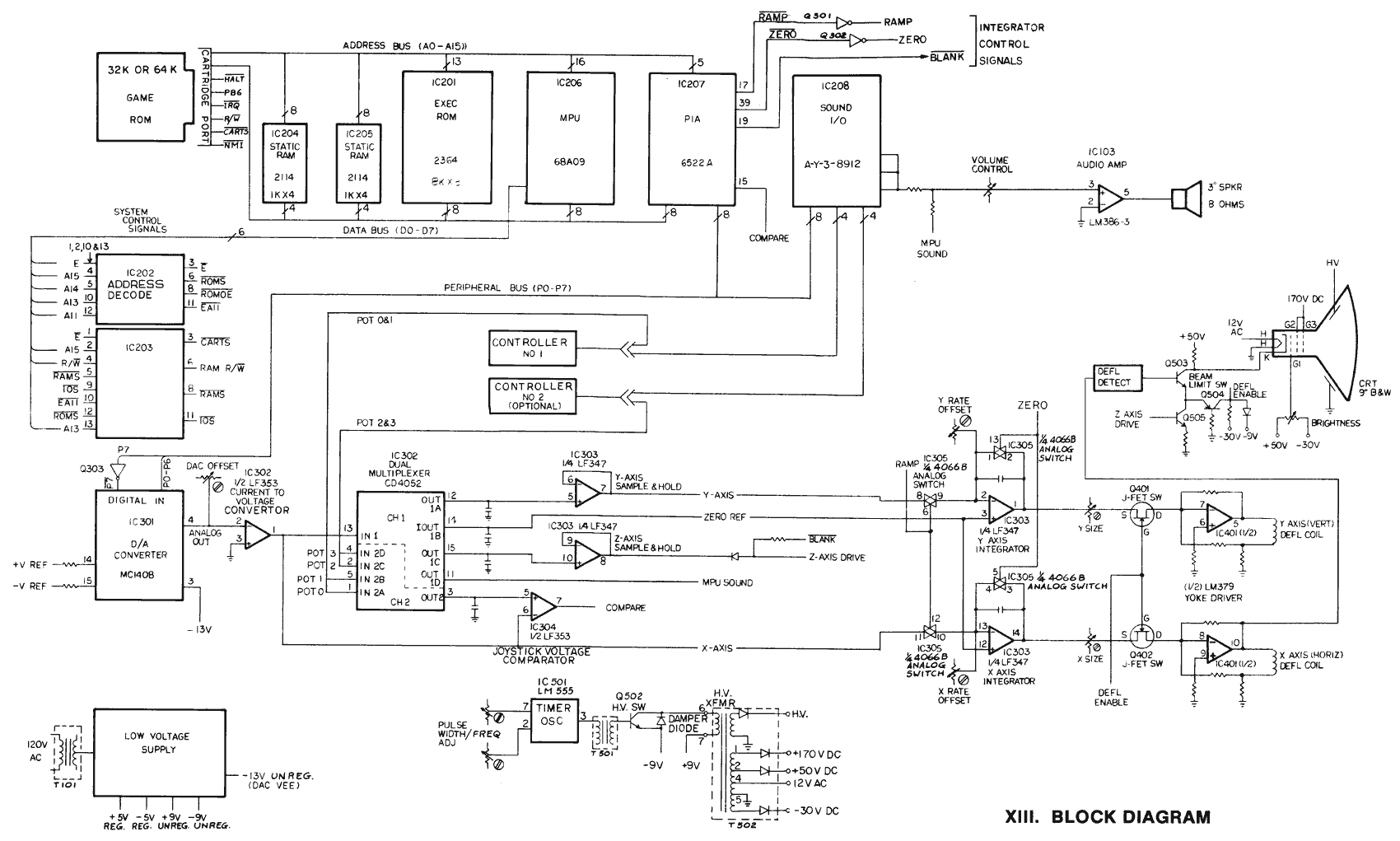
Block Diagram

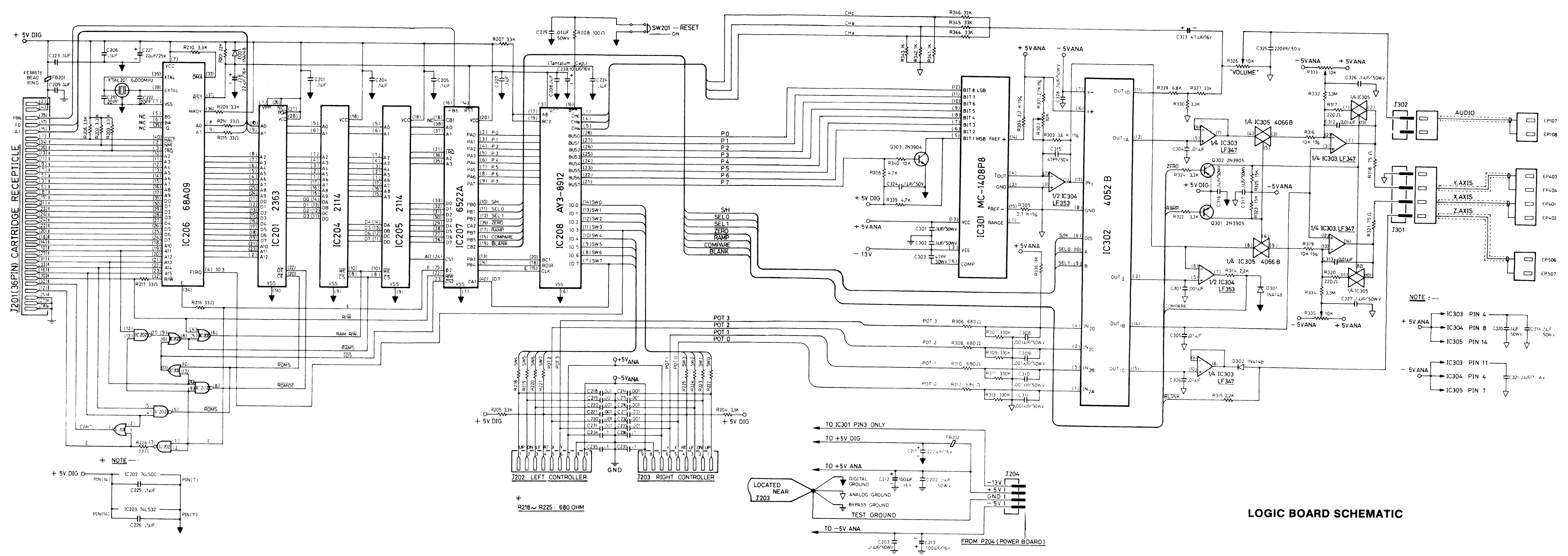
Logic Board Schematic

The Vectrex's CPU is a Motorola 68A09 clocked at 1.5 MHz, with 1 KB of RAM (two 4-bit 2114 chips) and 8 KB ROM (one 8-bit 2363 chip). It also uses a MOS Technology 6522 versatile interface adapter (VIA). Games are stored on ROM cartridges that are 32 KB in size. Controller inputs and audio are provided by a General Instrument AY-3-8912 sound chip. Sound is played through a 3-inch electrodynamic paper cone speaker.

The computer and vector generator were designed by Gerry Karr. The computer runs the game's computer code, watches the user's inputs, runs the sound generator, and controls the vector generator to make the screen drawings. The vector generator is an all-analog design using two integrators: X and Y. The computer sets the integration rates using a digital-to-analog converter. The computer controls the integration time by momentarily closing electronic analog switches within the operational-amplifier based integrator circuits. Voltage ramps are produced that the monitor uses to steer the electron beam over the face of the phosphor screen of the cathode-ray tube. Another signal is generated that controls the brightness of the line.

The cathode-ray tube is a Samsung model 240RB40 monochrome unit, displaying a picture size of 240 mm diagonal; it is an off-the-shelf picture tube manufactured for small black/white television sets. The brightness of the CRT is controlled using a circular knob on the back of the display. A vector CRT display such as the one in the Vectrex does not require a special tube, and differs from standard raster-based television sets only in the control circuits. Rather than use sawtooth waves to direct the internal electron beam in a raster pattern, computer-controlled integrators feed linear amplifiers to drive the deflection yoke. This yoke has similar, if not identical inductances, unlike a TV deflection yoke. The yoke uses a standard TV core. The high-voltage transformer also uses a standard core and bobbin. There is special circuitry to turn off the electron beam if the vector generator stops or fails. This prevents burning of the screen's phosphors. This design is a great deal smaller than the electronics found in the free-standing, full-sized Asteroids arcade machine.

During development, the possibility of using the MOS Technology 6502 processor was considered, but later its performance was considered insufficient.

Early units have a very audible "buzzing" from the built-in speaker that reacts to the graphics generated on screen. This is due to improper production grounding of signal lines of the low-level audio circuitry, and was eventually resolved in later production models. A "ground loop" had been created by a grounding strap added in production to meet U.S. Federal Communications Commission signal radiation requirements. This idiosyncrasy has become a familiar characteristic of the machine.

== Peripherals ==
=== 3-D Imager ===
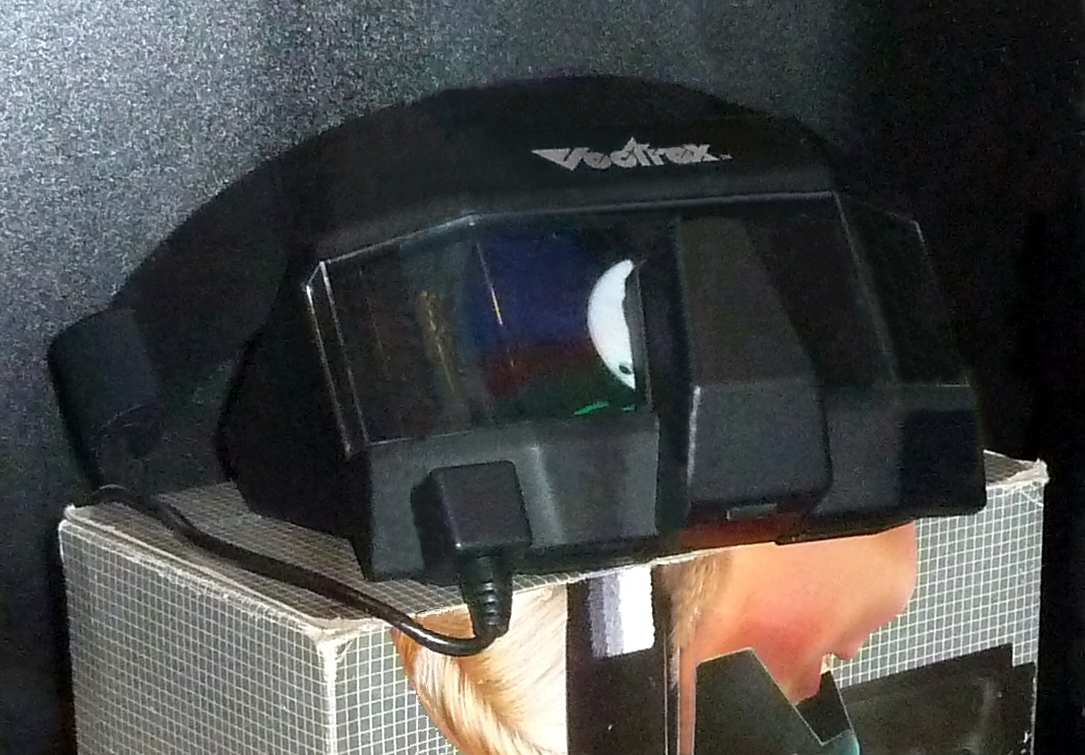
Vectrex 3-D Imager

The 3-D Imager, invented by John Ross, turns the 2-D black-and-white images drawn by the Vectrex into a color stereoscopic experience. The imager works by spinning a disk in front of the viewer's eyes. The disk is black for 180 degrees and in some cases has 60 degree wedges of transparent red, green, and blue filters. The user looks through this to the Vectrex screen. The Vectrex synchronizes the rotation of the disk to the software frame rate as it draws 6 screens: with the right eye covered: the left eye red image, then green, and then the blue image is drawn, and then, while the left eye is covered by the black 180-degree sector: the right eye red, green, and then the blue image is drawn. Only one eye will see the Vectrex screen and its 3 associated images (or colors) at any one time while the other will be blocked by the 180-degree mask. The prototype was made in the plastic casework of a Viewmaster. The disc spins freely and is driven by a motor. The Vectrex software generates its own frame-rate and compares it to an index signal from the glasses once per revolution. Score is kept of how many wheel rotations are early compared to the software frame rate, and how many are late. The software tries to keep these two trends equal by adjusting the power being delivered to the motor that spins the filter and mask wheel. Pulse Width Modulation (PWM) is used to control the motor speed: the ratio of the "on" time versus the "off" time of a rapid stream of power pulses to the motor. In this way the software synchronizes the rotation of the wheel to the software's frame rate, or drawing time, for the combined and repeating group of up to 6 evolving images.

A single object that does not lie on the plane of the monitor (i.e., in front of or into the monitor) is drawn at least twice to provide information for each eye. The distance between the duplicate images and the angles from which they are drawn will determine where the object will appear to "be" in 3D space. The 3D effect is also enhanced by adjusting the brightness of the object (dimming objects in the background). Spinning the disk at a high enough speed will fool the viewer's eyes/brain into thinking that the multiple images it is seeing are two different views of the same object due to the persistence of vision. This creates the impression of stereoscopy and color.

The same 3D effect is possible with raster or film-projection images, and the shutter glasses used in some 3D theaters and virtual reality theme park rides work using the same principle. The same technology is used by the 1995 Nintendo's 3D Headset console Virtual Boy

=== Light pen ===
The light pen allows the user to "draw", to create images and to indicate, on the screen. It has a photo-detector that can see the bright spot of the vector-drawing display monitor when it goes by under the light pen's position where it is being held to the screen. The photo-detector feeds internal pulse-catching circuits that tell the Vectrex and its software of the event. The prototype was made in the plastic casework of a Marks-A-Lot felt-tipped marker pen. The Vectrex draws a spider-web-like search-pattern to track the pen's location. The software changes the pattern size as the pen changes motions and velocity in an attempt keep a continuous lock on the pen's position. The Vectrex light pen was invented by John Ross.

== Screen overlays ==
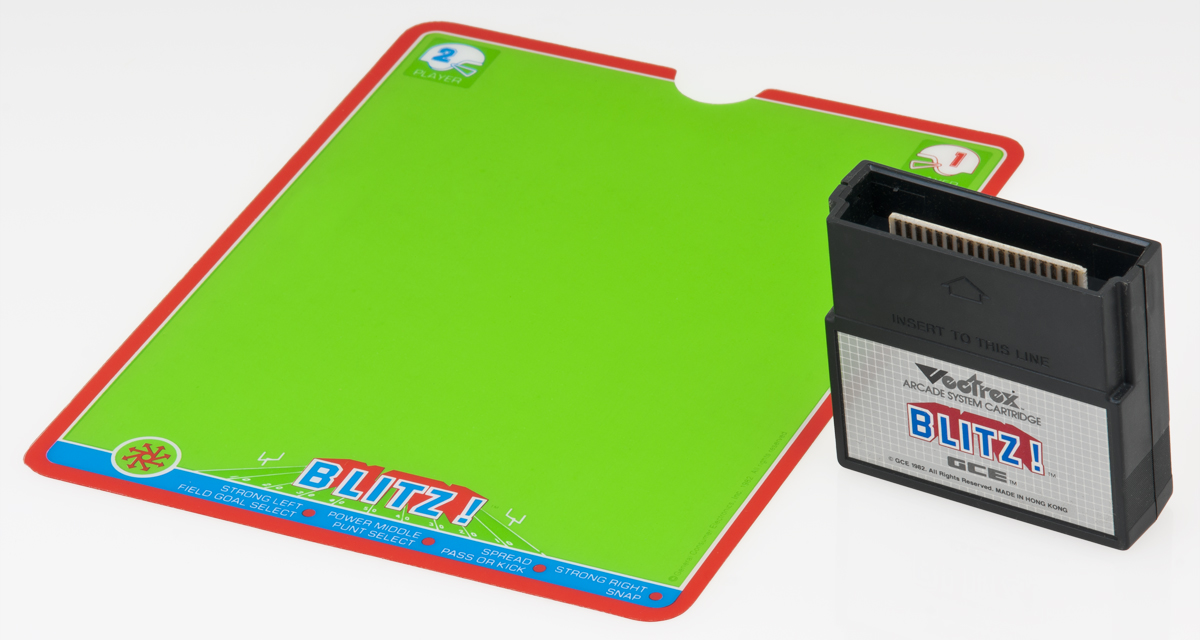
Games came supplied with color overlay sheets to compensate for the limitations of the screen.

In order to enhance the display visuals of the Vectrex, every commercially released game included its own unique translucent plastic screen overlay that accompanied the cartridge (a concept first seen with the Magnavox Odyssey, as well as some early arcade machines). Instead of physically touching the CRT screen, four tabs on the Vectrex console securely held them in place in front of it, with a small gap between the actual screen and the overlay. Made up of one to three colors for the play field area, these overlays simulate simple color graphics (on an otherwise black and white screen), helped reduced glare, flicker and gave the appearance of a flat screen. They also allowed changes in brightness intensity of vector graphics to be more visually distinctive. In some cases game designers created pseudo color cycling effects, for a sense of movement, by using alternating colored patterns. In addition to players' score areas, some overlays also contained additional artwork and patterns, to add to the game's play field. Across the bottom of each overlay are game-specific joystick and button functions as a guide for the player. Each overlay also displayed the title and logo of each game, along with a colored border or design, to add cosmetic flair to the Vectrex (much like an arcade machine with its marquee or side art). Overlays were not required, but added to the experience in terms of the visual look of game graphics and the overall display appearance of the console.

== Software ==
Some of the Vectrex's library consisted of ports of arcade hits, most of them brought to the console through a licensing deal with Cinematronics.

The liquor company Old Mr. Boston gave out a limited number of customized Clean Sweep cartridges, with a Mr. Boston sticker on the box. The overlay was the regular Clean Sweep overlay with the Mr. Boston name, logo, and copyright info running up either side. The game itself had custom text, and the player controlled a top hat rather than a vacuum. Clean Sweep was written by Richard Moszkowski.

== Reception ==
Byte in 1982 called Vectrex "one of the greatest game machines we have seen this year ... [Vectrex] is a good bet to score big with the consumer". The magazine praised the screen, stating that "it almost has to be seen to be believed; imagine playing games at home (or in the office) using vector graphics with three-dimensional rotation and zoom", and noted that "It is unusual and refreshing to see a product appearing on the market with its software ready to run". David H. Ahl stated in Creative Computing Video & Arcade Games in 1983 that "Vector graphics really do make a difference, and the strong line-up of games helps immensely".

== Legacy ==
Since late 1995, there has been a Usenet community of hobbyists writing games for ParaJVE, a Vectrex emulator. Its emulation is also a compound of MESS (included in MAME, so RetroArch too via libretro), DVE, lr-vex, Vecx, with a Wii version called VectrexWii. Schematics for a "Vectrex Multicart" cartridge is available, allowing several games to be packed on one cartridge. There are also several people manufacturing and selling newly made games, some complete as cartridges with packing and overlays in the style of the original commercially released games, others with varying degrees of packaging. New hardware has also been developed for the Vectrex in recent years, including a light pen that addressed the limitation of the original version by including buttons that replace the second controller required on the original version, and a daughterboard that addresses the well-known buzz in the system's audio (bypassing the original audio circuitry on the power board in favor of a module installed elsewhere within the cabinet).

== Rebirth ==
On May 21, 2025, @VectrexOn, the official handle of Vectrex on X (formerly Twitter), published a post presenting a new logo created by David Oghia. On July 8, Oghia announced a new project titled Vectrex Mini and began discussing it with the community on the "Vectrex fans unite!" Facebook group. The first prototypes of the Vectrex Mini were subsequently presented at several international events, first at Gamescom in Cologne, Germany, then Play Expo in Blackpool (UK), the Portland Retro Gaming Expo (PRGE - US), Paris Games Week (France), and Crash Live Expo in Kenilworth (UK).

The project officially launched on Kickstarter on November 3, 2025, and concluded on December 2, 2025, raising $1,301,353 from 5,583 backers. The Vectrex Mini is a modern half-scale reinterpretation of the original 1982 console, featuring a 5-inch AMOLED screen instead of the original CRT display.

As of 2026, the Vectrex Mini remains in active development. Delivery was scheduled for September 2026, however, that time was not reached.

== See also ==
- Microvision
- C1 Famicom TV
- Sharp Nintendo Television
- List of commercial failures in video gaming
- List of Vectrex games
